= Heavy metal genres =

Subtypes of heavy metal music

A number of heavy metal genres have developed since the emergence of heavy metal (often shortened to metal) during the late 1960s and early 1970s. At times, heavy metal genres may overlap or are difficult to distinguish, but they can be identified by a number of traits. They may differ in terms of instrumentation, tempo, song structure, vocal style, lyrics, guitar playing style, drumming style, and so on. Today, "heavy metal" can be used broadly as an umbrella term for all sub-genres, but is also used narrowly as a term for only the more traditional or conventional styles.

== Alternative metal ==
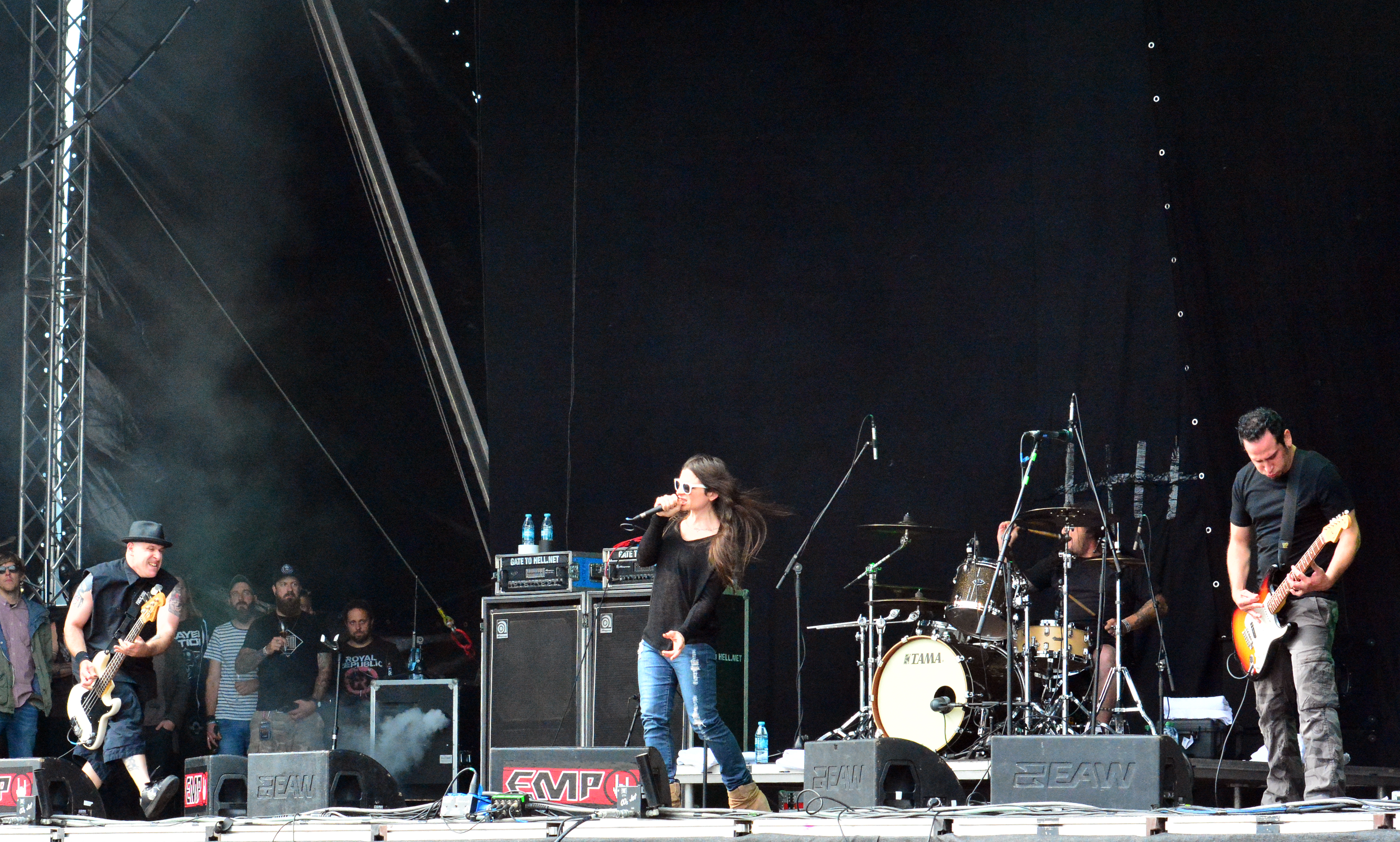
Alternative metal band Life of Agony

Alternative metal is a style of heavy metal and alternative rock which emerged in the mid-1980s and gained popularity in the early 1990s.

Alternative metal usually combines heavy metal with influences from genres like alternative rock, and in some cases, other genres not normally associated with metal as well. One of the main characteristics of alternative metal and its subgenres are heavily downtuned, mid-paced "chug"-like guitar riffs. Alternative metal bands are also often characterized by melodic vocals, unconventional sounds within other heavy metal genres, unconventional song structures, and sometimes experimental approaches to heavy music. Many of the early alternative metal bands originated from Los Angeles. Prominent bands in this genre include Soundgarden, Alice in Chains, Faith No More, Helmet, Life of Agony, Rollins Band and Tool. More modern bands include Breaking Benjamin, Chevelle, Godsmack and System of a Down.

=== Subgenres of alternative metal ===
==== Funk metal ====
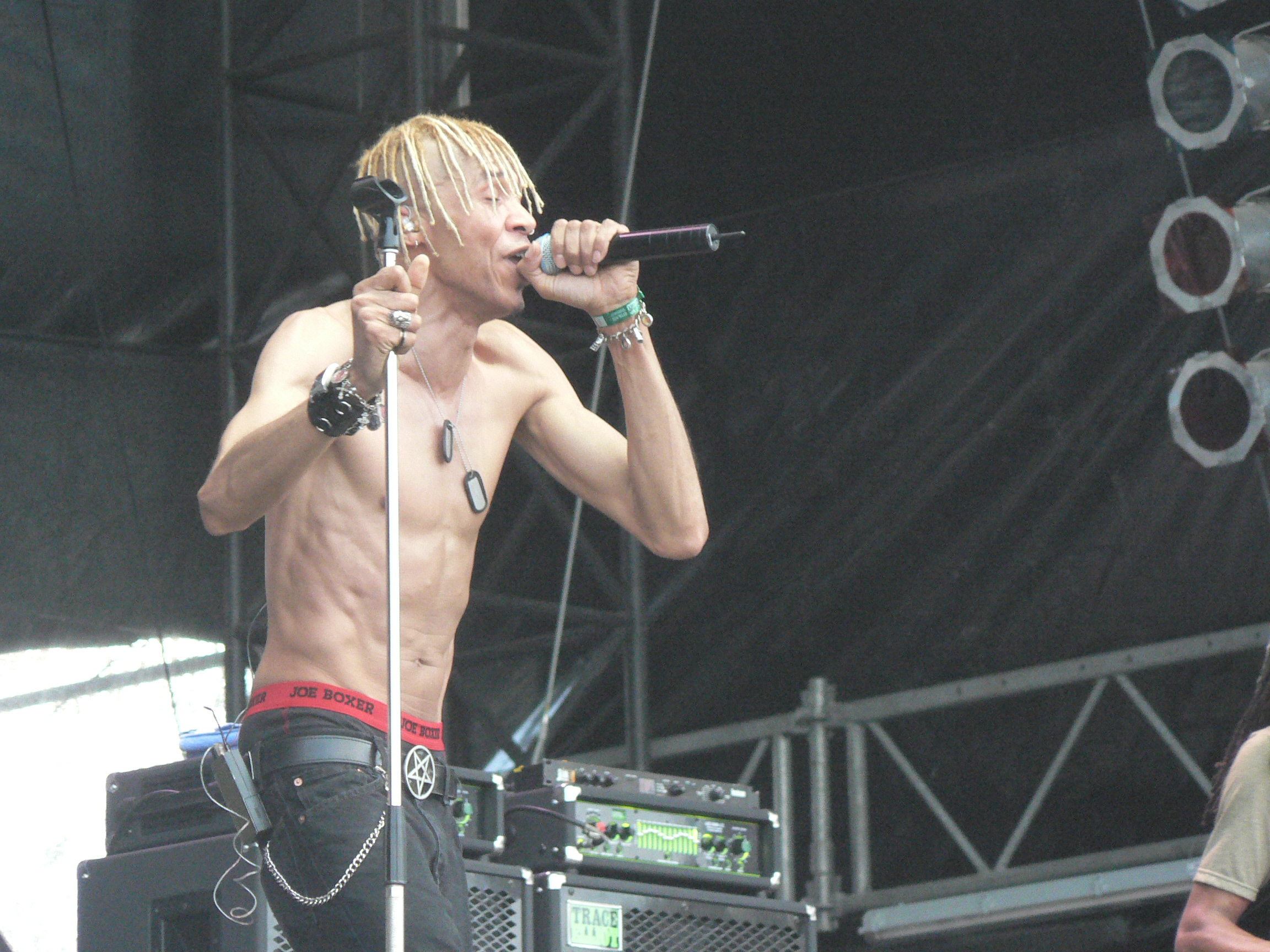
dUg Pinnick of King's X, substituting for Corey Glover of funk metal band Living Colour

Funk metal is essentially a fusion of heavy metal and funk. It started off in the late eighties as a subgenre of alternative metal and was heavily influenced by bands such as Red Hot Chili Peppers and Fishbone. Funk metal bands often use a conventional riffing style influenced by 1980s thrash metal, unlike bands from other alternative metal genres. During the late-'90s, many bands which started out as funk metal branched out into more commercially viable genres, such as alternative rock and nu metal. Notable funk metal bands include Living Colour, Infectious Grooves, Mordred, Primus, and Rage Against the Machine. The biggest regional scene during funk metal's prime was San Francisco.

==== Nu metal ====
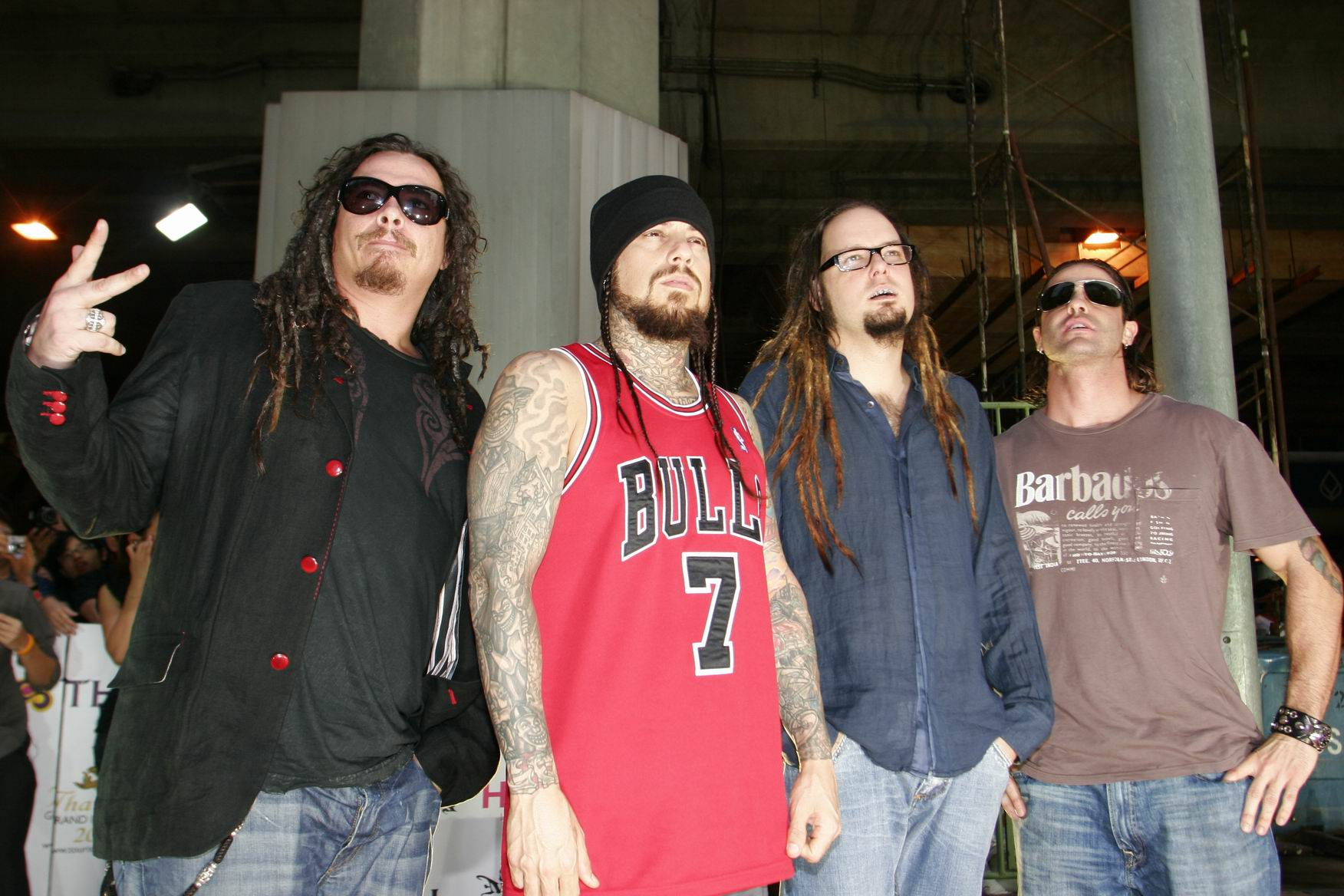
Nu metal band Korn

Nu metal, also known as aggro metal, is a fusion genre that blends alternative metal and groove metal elements with other styles, including grunge, industrial, funk and hip-hop. The nu metal builds on rap metal's rock and rap collaborations, but it highlights some of the more aggressive elements of its musical ancestors. Intense and angry lyrics, off-pitched guitars, and massively amplified beats are typical of nu metal songs. The style is mostly syncopated and based on riffs, and is influenced by groove metal rhythm. Some nu metal bands use seven-string guitars, which are sometimes down-tuned to increase heaviness, resulting in bass guitarists using five and six-string instruments. Turntables, sequencers and samplers are sometimes included. Nu metal vocal styles range between melodic singing, rapping, screaming and death growling. The Bakersfield-based Korn became the first band to be labeled as "nu metal". MTV states that Korn "arrived in 1993 into the burgeoning alternative metal scene, which would morph into nü-metal the way college rock became alternative rock." Coal Chamber, Limp Bizkit, Linkin Park, Slipknot, Papa Roach, Kittie and Disturbed are prominent bands in this genre.

==== Rap metal ====
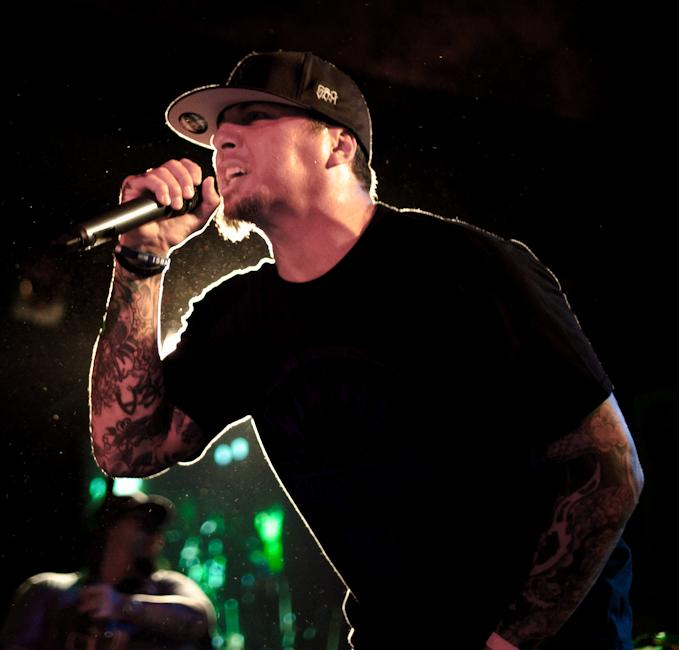
Sonny Sandoval of rap metal band P.O.D.

Rap metal bands institute the vocal and lyrical form of hip-hop. Examples of rap metal include Crazy Town, Clawfinger, Stuck Mojo, Skindred and Rage Against the Machine. The thrash metal band Anthrax also helped pioneer the genre. Rap metal is often mislabeled as rapcore (a genre which fuses hardcore punk with hip-hop) or nu metal, a genre which has similar elements in the music, rap metal usually does not include turntables or sampling into its sound, although keyboards are often used. Rap metal bands, unlike nu metal bands, are almost always fronted by rappers. Rap metal also lacks the melodic singing and growling commonly associated with nu metal.

== Avant-garde metal ==
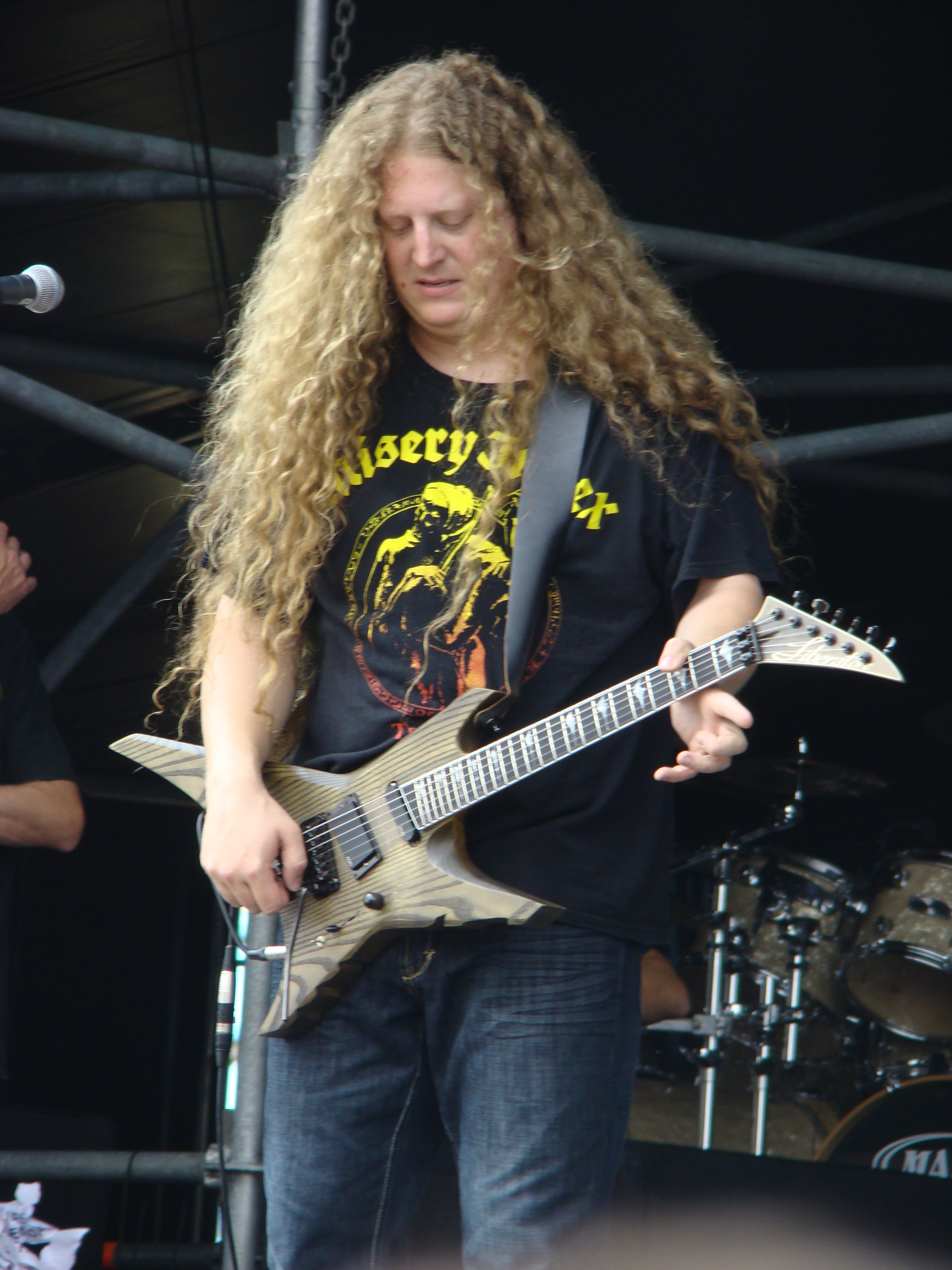
Dan Mongrain of avant-garde metal band Voivod

Avant-garde metal or avant-metal, also known as experimental metal, is a subgenre of heavy metal music loosely defined by use of experimentation, and characterized by the use of innovative, avant-garde elements, large-scale experimentation, and the use of non-standard and unconventional sounds, instruments, song structures, playing styles, and vocal techniques. It evolved out of progressive rock, jazz fusion, and extreme metal, particularly death metal. Some local scenes include Los Angeles and the San Francisco Bay Area in the United States, Oslo in Norway, and Tokyo in Japan. Pioneers of experimental metal include Boris, Celtic Frost, Earth, Helmet, Maudlin of the Well, Neurosis, Sunn O))), and Voivod.

== Black metal ==
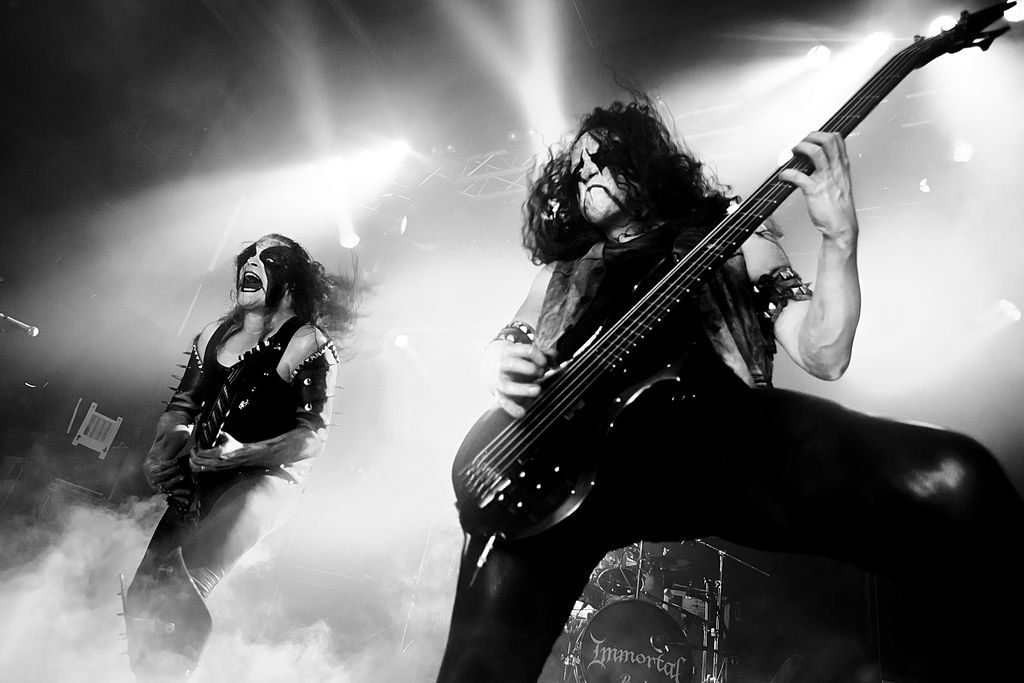
Black metal band Immortal

Black metal is an extreme subgenre of heavy metal. Similarly to avant garde metal bands, black metal singers and groups also feature unconventional song structures and lyrical emphasis on atmosphere. Common traits include fast tempos, shrieked vocals, highly distorted guitars played with tremolo picking, blast beat drumming, raw recording, and unconventional song structures.

During the 1980s, several thrash metal bands formed a prototype for black metal. This so-called "first wave" included bands such as Venom, Bathory, Mercyful Fate, Hellhammer and Celtic Frost. A "second wave" arose in the early 1990s, spearheaded by Norwegian bands such as Mayhem, Burzum, Darkthrone, Immortal, and Emperor. The music of the early Norwegian black metal scene became a distinct genre. Initially considered a synonym for "Satanic metal", black metal has often been met with hostility from mainstream culture, mainly due to the misanthropic and anti-Christian standpoint of many artists. Moreover, several of the genre's pioneers have been linked with church burnings and murder. Some have also been linked to neo-Nazism; however, most black metal fans and most prominent black metal musicians reject Nazi ideology and oppose its influence on the black metal subculture.

=== Derivatives of black metal ===
==== National Socialist black metal ====
NSBM typically melds Neo-Nazi beliefs (such as fascism, white supremacy, white separatism, antisemitism, xenophobia, and homophobia) with hostility to "foreign" religions (Christianity, Judaism, Islam, etc.). Bands often promote ethnic European paganism, occultism, or Satanism. Hendrik Möbus of Absurd described Nazism as the "most perfect (and only realistic) synthesis of Satanic/Luciferian will to power, elitist Social Darwinism, connected to Aryan Germanic paganism". Members of the band Der Stürmer (named after the antisemitic newspaper edited by Julius Streicher) subscribe to esoteric Hitlerism, leaning on the works of Savitri Devi and Julius Evola.

==== Red and Anarchist black metal ====
Red and Anarchist black metal, often shortened to the acronym RABM, is black metal in which the artists espouse various far-left and environmentalist ideologies such as anarchism, Marxism, and green anarchism. It emerged as an amalgamation of black metal with anarchist crust punk, and typically eschews the traditional Satanic and nihilist lyrics of black metal. While some artists such as Iskra, Panopticon, Puna Terrori and Skagos overtly endorse political agendas and manifestos, others, such as Wolves in the Throne Room and some other Cascadian artists, would not explicitly associate with the red or anarchist label. Other RABM artists include Storm of Sedition, Not A Cost, Black Kronstadt, Crepehanger, Leper, Mutiny, Fauna, and Vidargangr.

==== Symphonic black metal ====
Symphonic black metal is a style of black metal that incorporates symphonic and orchestral elements. This may include the usage of music workstation keyboards to conjure up "pseudo-orchestral" landscapes with default presets (e.g. strings, choirs, piano, organs, and pads), or full orchestral arrangements containing woodwind, brass, percussion, keyboards and strings. Bands like Carach Angren may feature solo instruments such as violins, in addition to virtual or live orchestral arrangements. Vocals can be "clean" or operatic in style, and song structures are more defined or are inspired by symphonies, albeit not adhering to forms found in Western music (e.g. sonata, rondo, theme and variations) and following a typical riff-based approach. Many of the characteristics of traditional black metal are retained, such as shrieked vocals, fast tempos, high treble gain and tremolo picked electric guitars. But the speed is usually slower, the song structure is clearer, the band uses a lot of keyboards, and even the entire orchestra, just like symphonic metal. Examples of symphonic black metal include Emperor and Dimmu Borgir.

==== Viking metal ====
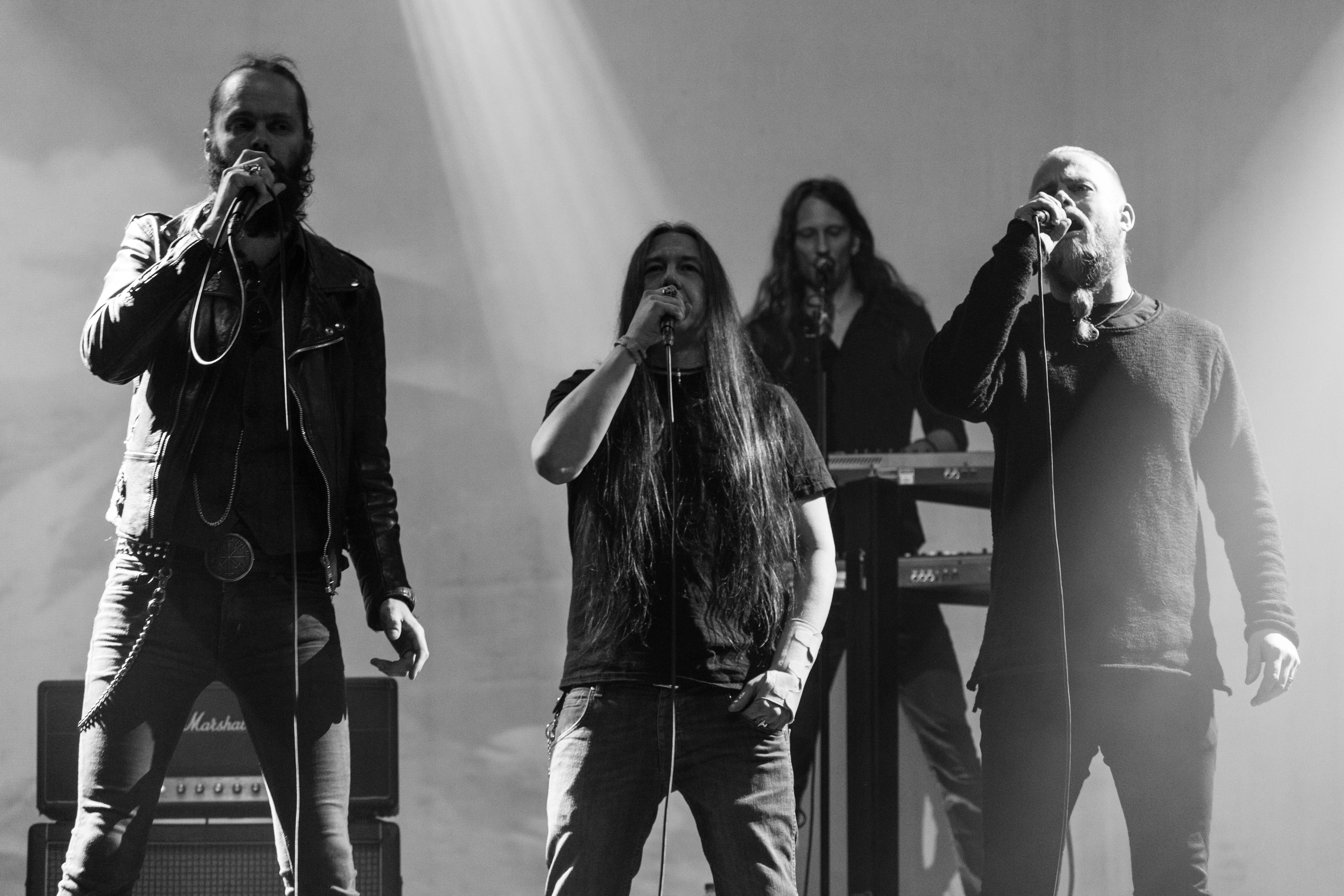
Viking metal band Enslaved

Viking metal is a subgenre of heavy metal music with origins in black metal and Nordic folk music, characterized by a common lyrical and thematic focus on Norse mythology, Norse paganism, and the Viking Age. Its musical style is typically manifested as Nordic folk-influenced black metal. Some common traits include a slow-paced and heavy riffing style, anthemic choruses, use of both clean and harsh vocals, a frequent use of folk instrumentation, and, often, the use of keyboards for atmospheric effect. Viking metal developed in the 1980s through the mid-1990s as a rejection of Satanism and the occult, instead embracing the Vikings and paganism as the leaders of opposition to Christianity. Most Viking metal bands originate from the Nordic countries, and nearly all bands claim that their members descend, directly or indirectly, from Vikings. Bathory, from Sweden, is generally credited with pioneering the genre with its albums Blood Fire Death (1988) and Hammerheart (1990). Enslaved, Burzum, Emperor, Storm and Falkenbach helped further develop the genre in the early through mid-1990s. The death metal bands Unleashed and Amon Amarth, which emerged during the early 1990s, also adopted Viking themes, broadening the genre from its primarily black metal origin. Other key bands in the genre include Darkwoods My Betrothed, Einherjer, Ensiferum, Moonsorrow, Thyrfing, and Windir.

==== War metal ====
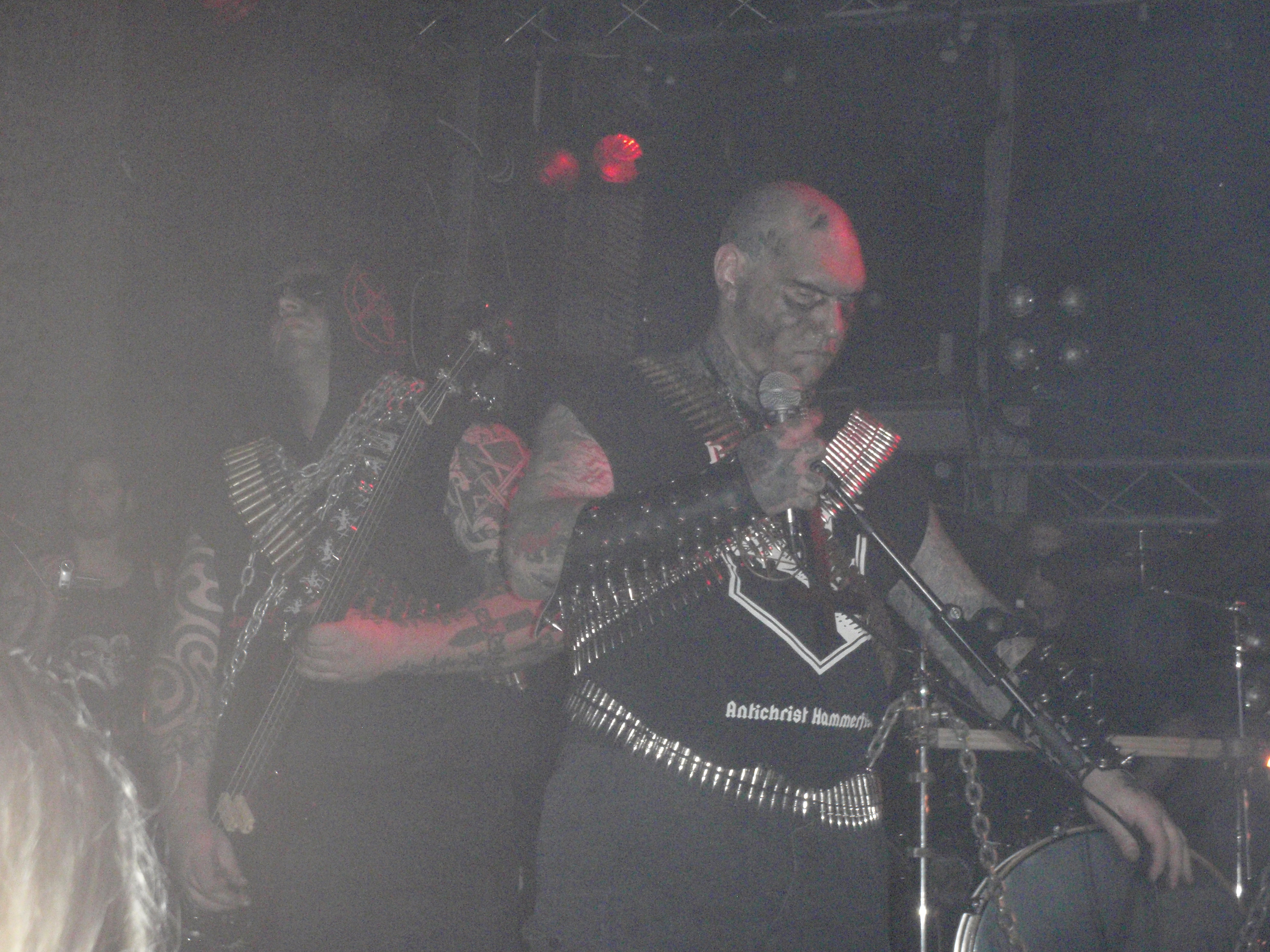
War metal band Blasphemy

War metal, also known as war black metal or bestial black metal, is an aggressive, cacophonous and chaotic black metal style, described by Rock Hard journalist Wolf-Rüdiger Mühlmann as "rabid" and "hammering". Important influences include first wave band Sodom and first wave/death metal band Possessed, as well as old grindcore, black, and death metal bands like Repulsion, Autopsy, Sarcófago and the first two Sepultura releases. War metal bands include Blasphemy, Archgoat, Impiety, In Battle, Zyklon-B.

==== Blackgaze ====
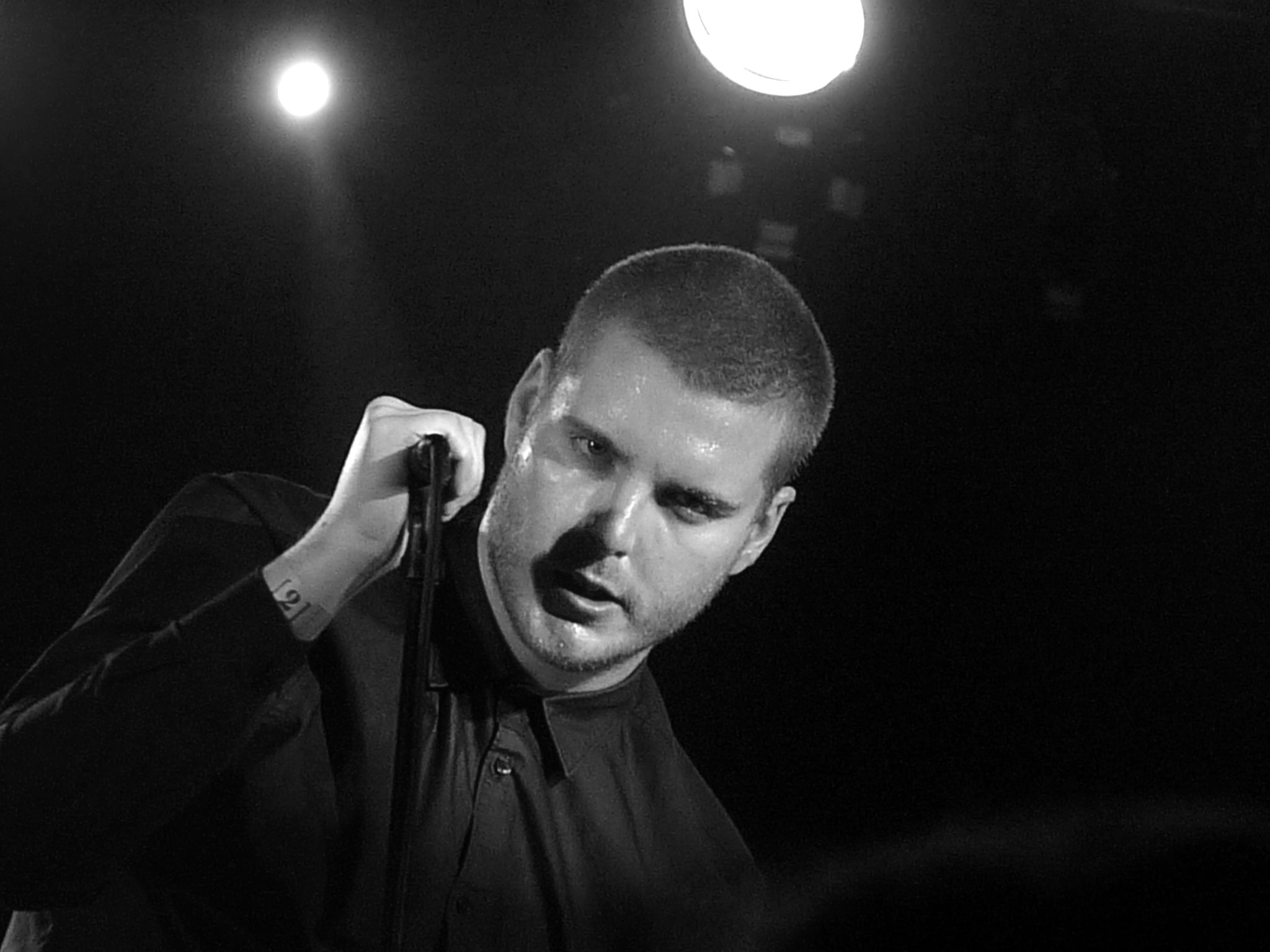
George Clark of blackgaze band Deafheaven

Blackgaze is a genre fusion of black metal and shoegaze that originated in the early 2000s. The genre often incorporates heavier elements common of black metal, including blast beat drumming and high-pitched screamed vocals with melodic elements, and heavily distorted "Wall of Sound" guitar styles typically associated with shoegazing. The French shoegazing band Alcest is often credited with having influenced and formed the genre, while American bands such as Deafheaven have become synonymous as to defining the genre's characteristics.

==== Post-black metal ====
Post-black metal is a subgenre of black metal that emphasizes more experimentation and creative expression than other forms, as well as molding different music genres into black metal. Bands such as Deafheaven, Alcest, Liturgy, Deathspell Omega, and Altar of Plagues are notable bands in this genre.

== Christian metal ==
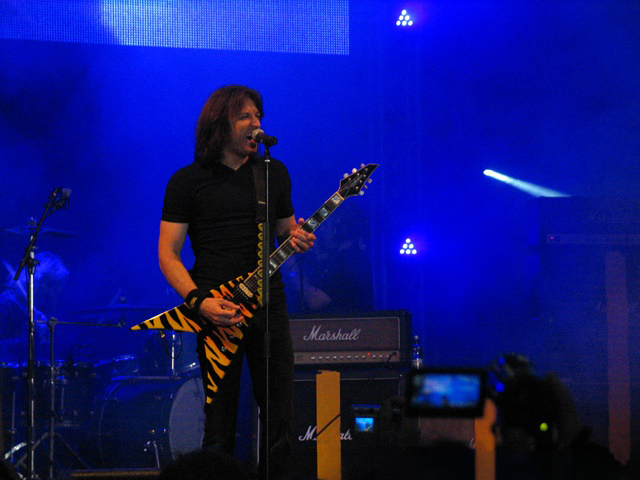
Michael Sweet of Christian metal band Stryper

Christian metal, also known as white metal, is a form of heavy metal music usually defined by its message using song lyrics as well as the dedication of the band members to Christianity. Christian metal is typically performed by professed Christians, sometimes principally for Christians who listen to heavy metal music, and often produced and distributed through various Christian networks.

Christian metal artists exist in all the subgenres of heavy metal music, and the only common link among most Christian metal artists are the lyrics. The Christian themes are often melded with the subjects of the genre the band is rooted in, regularly providing a Christian take on the subject matter. It has been argued that the marginal yet transnational Christian metal subculture provides its core members an alternative religious expression and Christian identity, and that the music serves the purpose of offering a positive alternative or counterbalance to 'secular' metal music, which is known for its generally dark and negative message.

Christian metal emerged in the late 1970s as a means of evangelism to the wider heavy metal music scene and was pioneered by American bands Resurrection Band and Petra and Sweden's Jerusalem. Los Angeles's Stryper achieved wide success in the 1980s. California's Tourniquet and Australia's Mortification led the movement in the 1990s. Rap metal group P.O.D. and the metalcore groups Underoath, Demon Hunter, As I Lay Dying, and Norma Jean (dubbed by Revolver magazine as "The Holy Alliance") brought some mainstream attention to the movement in the first decade of the 21st century, achieving ranks in the Billboard 200. Saving Grace is another example of a Christian metalcore band.

=== Derivatives of Christian metal ===
==== Christian death metal ====
In the late 1980s and early to mid-1990s, Christian death metal bands also emerged. Incubus (later known as Opprobrium), formed in 1986 in Louisiana, United States by two brothers recently immigrated from Brazil, was Christian and in the late 1980s experimented with a death metal sound. The Melbourne, Australia, groups Mortification and Vomitorial Corpulence, Living Sacrifice and Crimson Thorn, from the United States, and Sympathy, from Canada, were the main progenitors of the Christian death metal.

In the late 1990s and early 2000s, Norway's Extol, Finland's Immortal Souls and Deuteronomium, Sweden's Pantokrator, Germany's Sacrificium, Ukraine's Holy Blood, the United States' Embodyment, Feast Eternal, Possession, Aletheian, Becoming the Archetype, and Tortured Conscience, and Brazil's Antidemon all further developed the genre. In the latter half of the 2000s, Impending Doom (from the United States) and Blood Covenant (from India) joined the forefront of Christian death metal.

==== Unblack metal ====
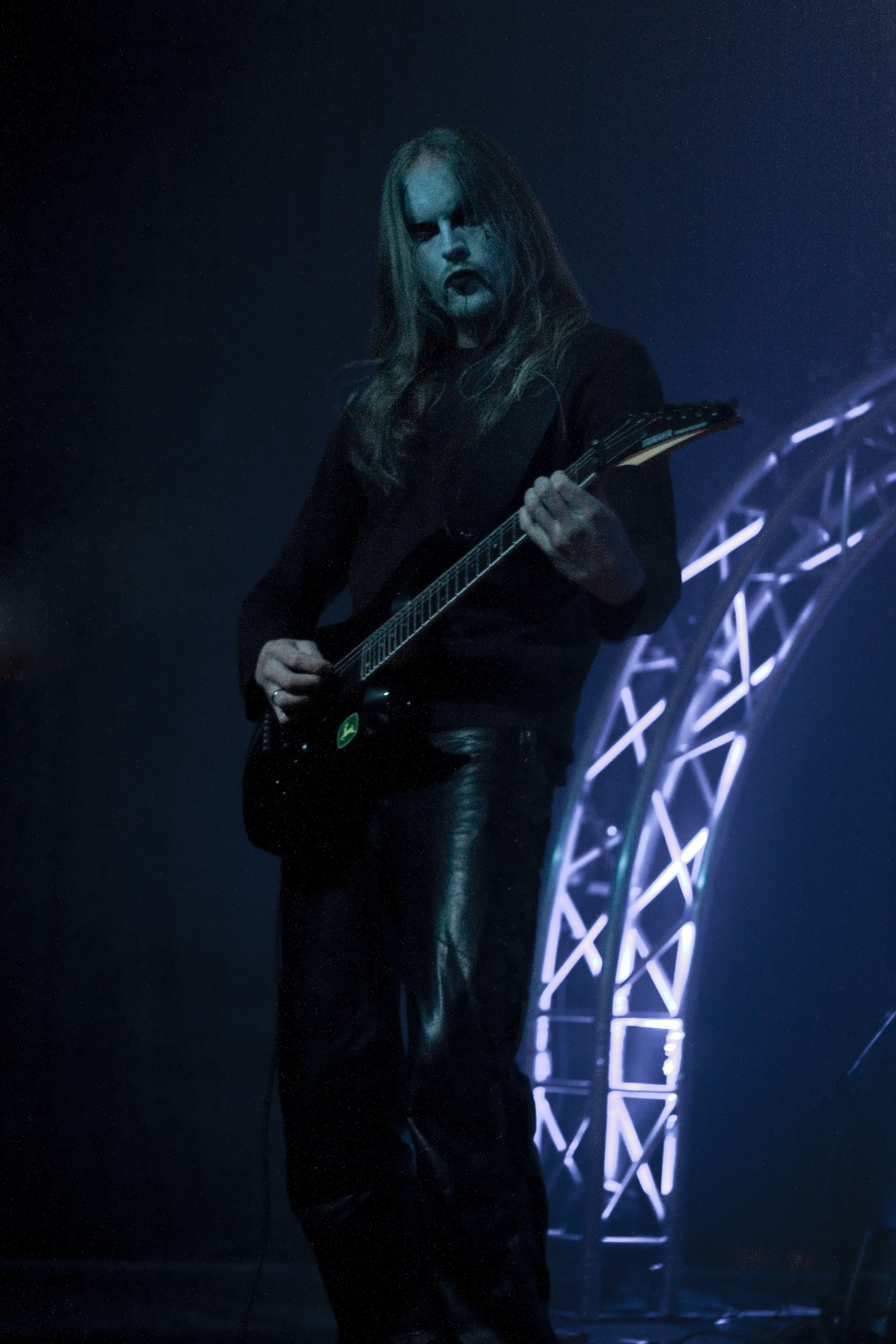
Lars Stokstad of unblack metal band Antestor

Unblack metal, sometimes called Christian black metal, is a genre of music that is stylistically black metal, but whose artists promote Christianity in their lyrics and imagery. Such artists are controversial, mainly because black metal's pioneers, especially those of the Second Wave, intended to encourage hostility towards Christianity. It is also suggested that Christianity contradicts black metal's dark nature, and the individualistic and misanthropic ideals of many bands.

The exact beginning of the Christian black metal movement is disputed. The Australian band Horde's 1994 album Hellig Usvart brought the concept and the term holy unblack metal (a word play on Darkthrone's slogan "unholy black metal" used on the albums A Blaze in the Northern Sky and Under a Funeral Moon) to media attention. The Norwegian band Antestor formed in 1990 as a death/doom act and released its demo The Defeat of Satan in 1991, before they began shifting towards black metal on their 1994 album Martyrium. Other examples of unblack metal bands include Crimson Moonlight, Admonish, and Frosthardr.

== Crust punk ==
Crust punk, often simply called crust, is a form of music influenced by anarcho-punk, hardcore punk and extreme metal. The style, which evolved in the mid-1980s in England, often has songs with dark and pessimistic lyrics that linger on political and social ills. The term "crust" was coined by Hellbastard on their 1986 Ripper Crust demo.

Crust is partly defined by its "bassy" and "dirty" sound. It is often played at a fast tempo with occasional slow sections. Vocals are usually guttural and may be growled or screamed. Crust punk takes cues from the anarcho-punk aspect of Crass and Discharge, and the extreme metal of bands like Venom and Celtic Frost. Notable crust punk bands include Amebix, Antisect and Doom.

=== Derivatives of crust punk ===
==== Blackened crust ====
Crust punk groups, such as Amebix, took some influence from early black metal bands like Venom, Hellhammer, and Celtic Frost. Similarly, Bathory was initially inspired by crust punk, as well as heavy metal. Crust punk was affected by a second wave of black metal in the 1990s, with some bands emphasizing these black metal elements. Iskra are probably the most obvious example of second wave black metal-influenced crust punk; Iskra coined their own phrase "blackened crust" to describe their new style. The Japanese group Gallhammer also fused crust punk with black metal while the English band Fukpig has been said to have elements of crust punk, black metal, and grindcore. In addition, Norwegian band Darkthrone have incorporated crust punk traits in their more recent material. As Daniel Ekeroth wrote in 2008:

In a very ironic paradox, black metal and crust punk have recently started to embrace one another. Members of Darkthrone and Satyricon have lately claimed that they love punk, while among crusties, black metal is the latest fashion. In fact, the latest album by crust punk band Skitsystem sounds very black metal—while the latest black metal opus by Darkthrone sounds very punk! This would have been unimaginable in the early 90s.

—

== Death metal ==
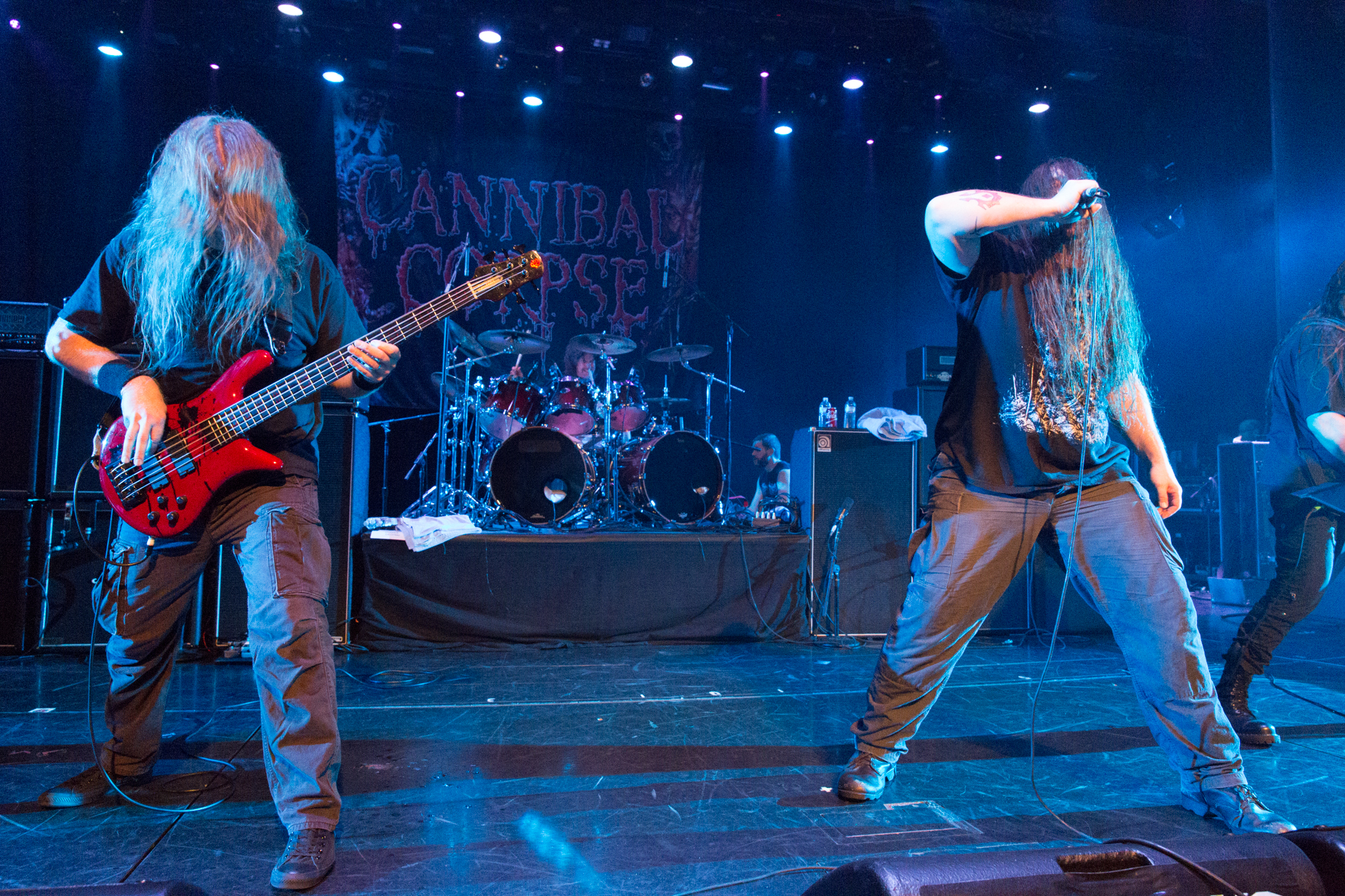
Death metal band Cannibal Corpse

Death metal is an extreme subgenre of heavy metal music. Death metal is characterized by a hard and subdued sound. Guitars and bass are often converted to heavy metal variants to tone down multiple tones, creating an unparalleled dark and mindless sound. It typically employs heavily distorted guitars, tremolo picking, deep growling vocals, blast beat drumming, minor keys or atonality, and complex song structures with multiple tempo changes.

Building from the musical structure of thrash metal and early black metal, death metal emerged during the mid-1980s. Metal acts such as Slayer, Kreator, Celtic Frost, and Venom were very important influences to the crafting of the genre. Possessed and Death, along with bands such as Obituary, Carcass, Deicide and Morbid Angel are often considered pioneers of the genre. In the late 1980s and early 1990s, death metal gained more media attention as popular genre niche record labels like Combat, Earache and Roadrunner began to sign death metal bands at a rapid rate. Since then, death metal has diversified, spawning a variety of subgenres.

=== Derivatives of death metal ===
==== Blackened death metal ====
Blackened death metal is a style that combines death metal and black metal. Examples of blackened death metal bands are Belphegor, Behemoth, Akercocke, Dissection and Sacramentum.

==== Death 'n' roll ====
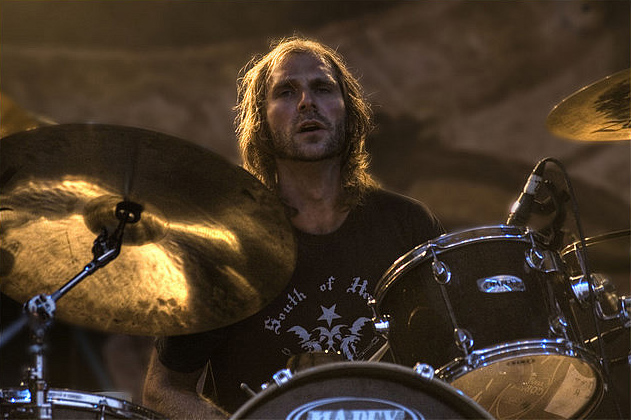
Olle Dahlstedt of Swedish death 'n' roll band Entombed

"Death 'n' roll" is a term for death metal bands that incorporate rock and roll elements to their overall sound. The term is a blend of death metal and rock 'n' roll. The achieved effect is that of death metal's trademark combination of growled vocals and highly distorted detuned guitar riffing with elements reminiscent of 1970s hard rock and heavy metal. Notable examples include Entombed, Six Feet Under, Gorefest, Helltrain, and Deuteronomium.

==== Melodic death metal ====
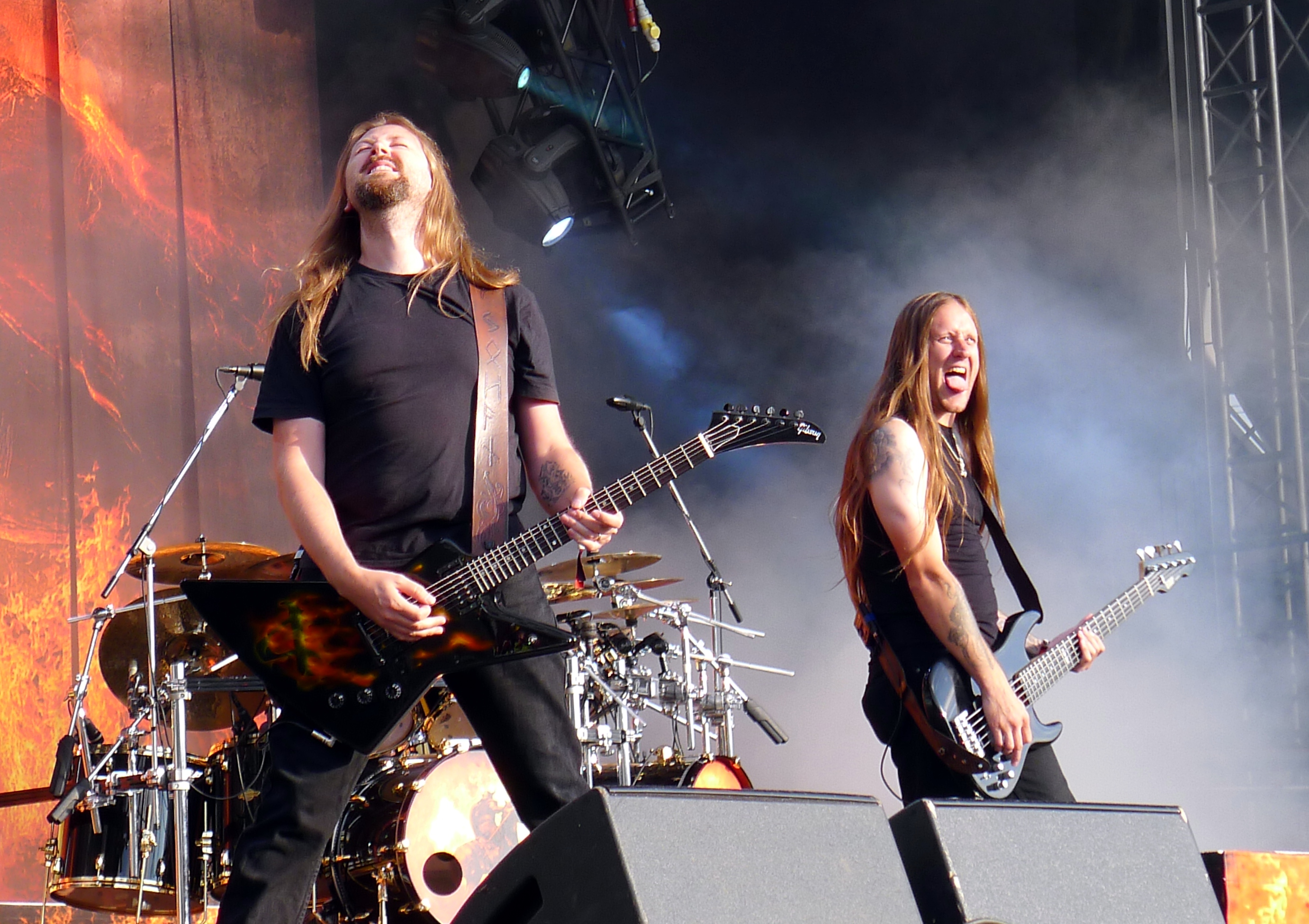
Swedish melodic death metal band Amon Amarth

Melodic death metal, also referred to as melodeath or MDM, is a heavy metal music style that combines elements from the new wave of British heavy metal (NWOBHM) with elements of death metal. The style was developed during the early and mid-1990s, primarily in England and Scandinavia. The Swedish death metal scene in particular did much to popularize the style, which soon centered in the "Gothenburg metal" scene in Gothenburg, Sweden. Some prominent melodic death metal bands include Amon Amarth, At the Gates, Soilwork, Dark Tranquillity, Arch Enemy, In Flames, and Carcass. Recently, the boundaries of the genre have also become blurred. Melodic death metal is often combined with genres such as avant-garde metal, doomsday metal, flogging metal, or black metal. In the 2000s, the type evolved in many directions.

==== Technical death metal ====
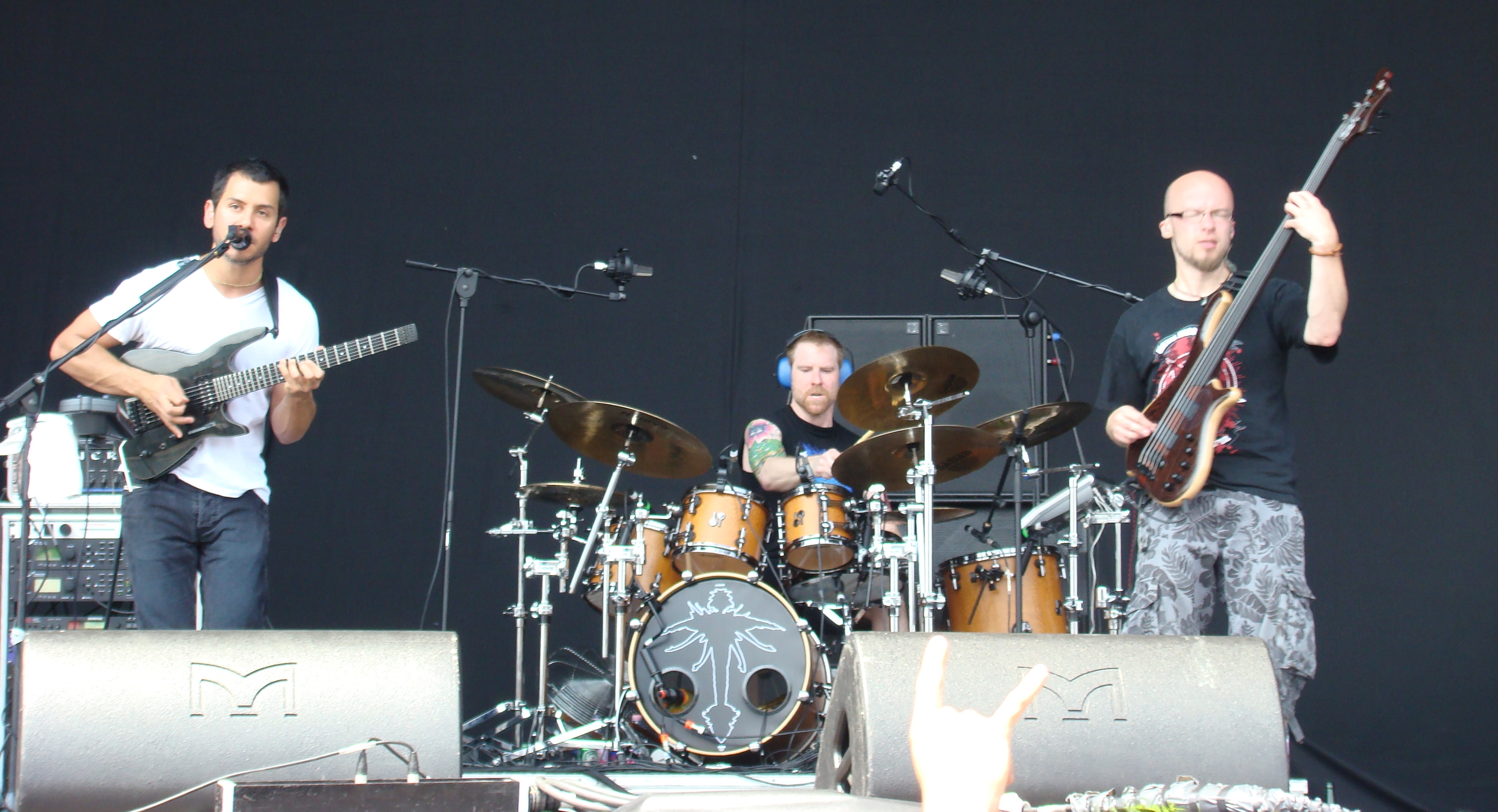
Technical death metal band Cynic

Technical death metal, often abbreviated to tech death, is characterized by fast, technically complex guitar and drum work, often including sweeping guitar solos. Vocals often adopt the guttural sound of death metal. Some of the first tech death bands include Death, Pestilence, Atheist, Nocturnus, Cynic, Origin and Cephalic Carnage. The music is often dark in nature.

==== Symphonic death metal ====
Bands described as symphonic death metal include Ex Deo, Necronomicon, Septicflesh, Children of Bodom, Epica, and Fleshgod Apocalypse. Haggard's 2000 album, Awaking the Centuries, has been described as death metal-styled symphonic metal.

== Doom metal ==
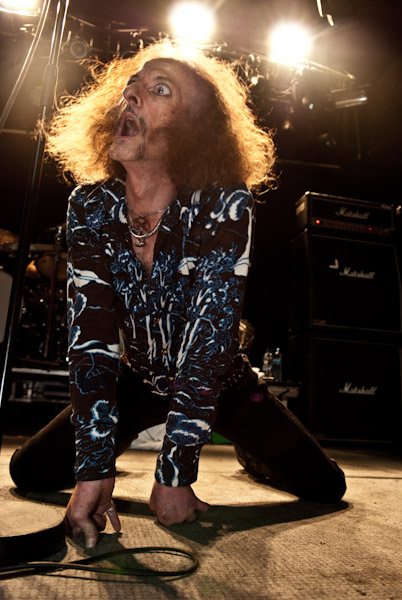
Bobby Liebling of doom metal band Pentagram

Doom metal is an extreme form of heavy metal music that typically uses slower tempos, low-tuned guitars, and a much "thicker" or "heavier" sound than other metal genres. Both the music and the lyrics intend to evoke a sense of despair, dread, and impending doom. The genre is strongly influenced by the early work of Black Sabbath, who formed a prototype for doom metal with songs such as "Black Sabbath", "Electric Funeral" and "Into the Void". During the first half of the 1980s, a number of bands from England (Pagan Altar, Witchfinder General), the United States (Pentagram, Saint Vitus, Trouble) and Sweden (Candlemass, Count Raven) defined doom metal as a distinct genre.

=== Derivatives of doom metal ===
==== Death/doom ====
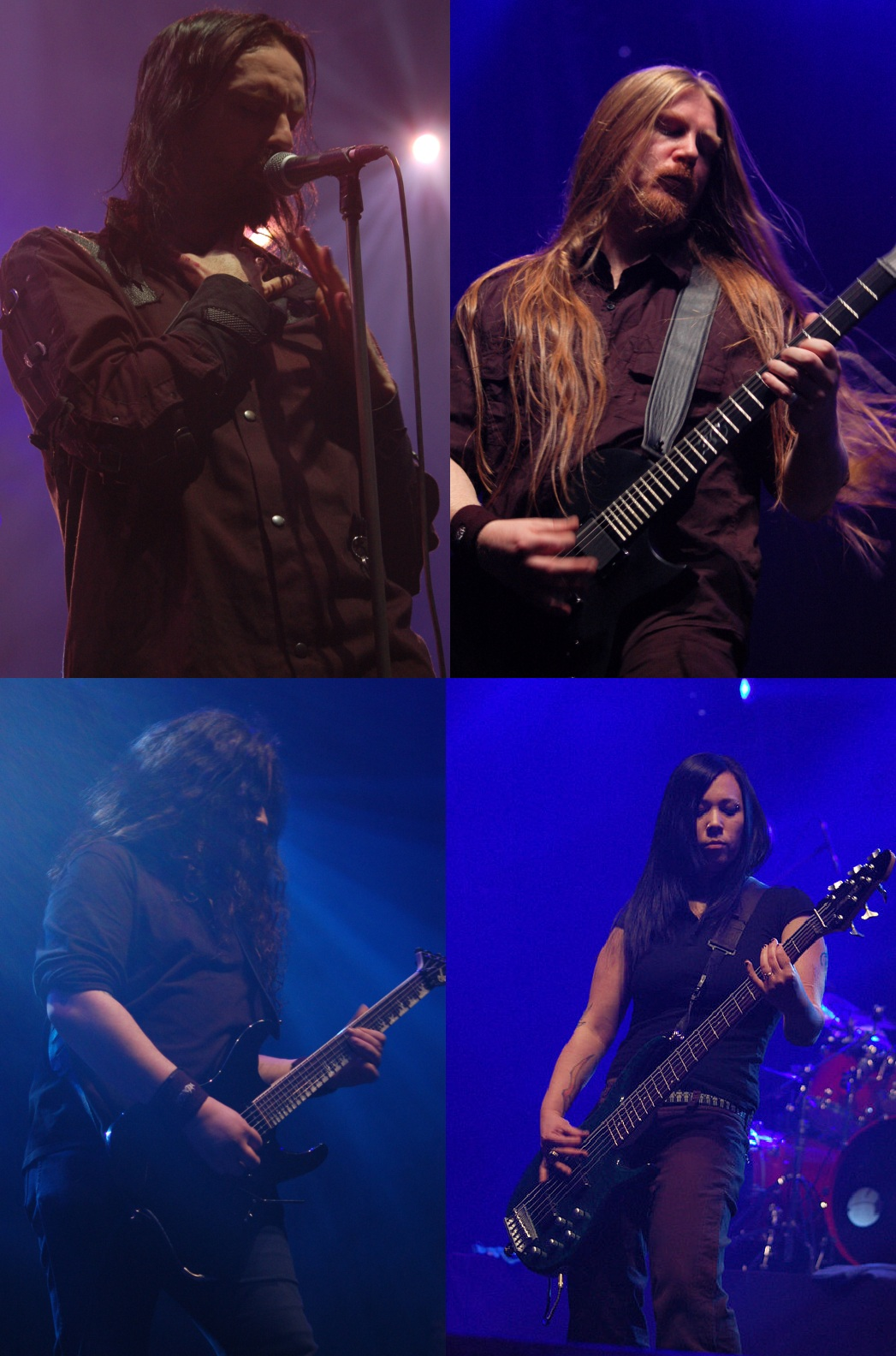
Death/doom band My Dying Bride

Death/doom, sometimes written as death-doom or deathdoom, is an extreme subgenre of heavy metal. It combines the slow tempos and pessimistic or depressive mood of doom metal, with the deep growling vocals and double kick drumming of death metal. The genre emerged in the mid-1980s, and gained a certain amount of popularity during the 1990s, but had become less common by the turn of the 21st century. In turn, death/doom gave rise to the closely related genre of funeral doom, as well as to the more melodic and romantic gothic metal. The death/doom genre originated in the mid-1980s when the early progenitors like Dream Death began to mix traditional doom metal with the sounds of thrash and the nascent death metal scene. Early records by such bands as Paradise Lost, My Dying Bride and Anathema combined the sounds of mid-1980s Celtic Frost and Candlemass with the use of female vocals, keyboards and, in the case of My Dying Bride, violins.

==== Drone metal ====
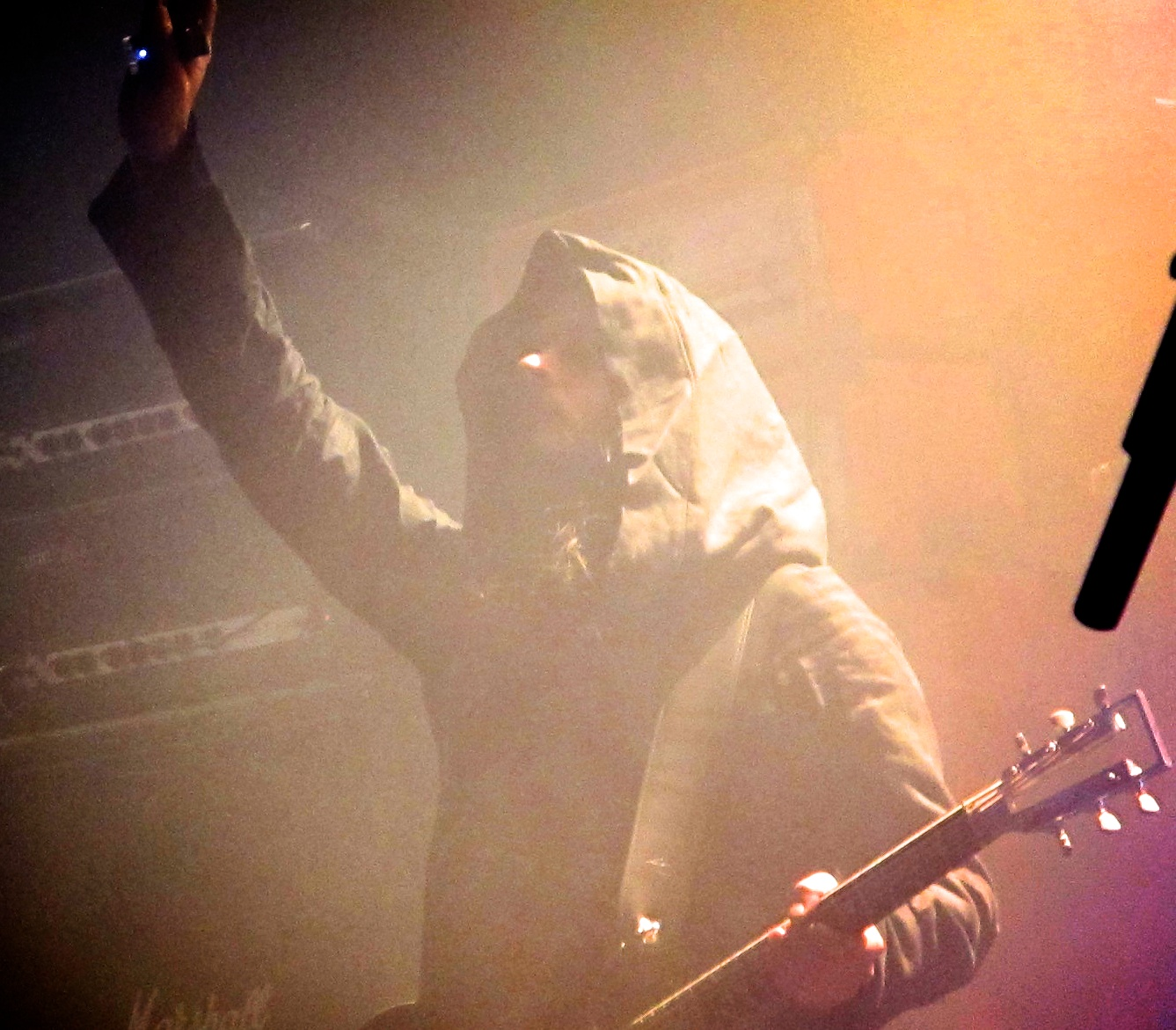
Greg Anderson of drone metal band Sunn O)))

Drone metal, also known as drone doom, began as a derivative of doom metal and it is largely defined by drones; notes or chords that are sustained and repeated throughout a piece of music. Typically, the electric guitar is performed with large amounts of reverb and feedback, while vocals, if present, are usually growled or screamed. Songs are often very long and lack beat or rhythm in the traditional sense. Drone doom is generally influenced by drone music, noise music and minimalist music. The style emerged in the early 1990s and was pioneered by Earth, Boris and Sunn O))).

==== Funeral doom ====
Funeral doom is a style of doom metal that crosses death-doom with funeral dirge music. It is played at a very slow tempo and places an emphasis on evoking a sense of emptiness and despair. Typically, electric guitars are heavily distorted, and dark ambient aspects such as keyboards or synthesizers are often used to create a "dreamlike" atmosphere. Vocals consist of mournful chants or growls and are often in the background. Funeral doom was pioneered by Mournful Congregation (Australia), Esoteric (United Kingdom), Evoken (United States), Funeral (Norway), Thergothon (Finland), Skepticism (Finland) and Corrupted (Japan).

==== Sludge metal ====
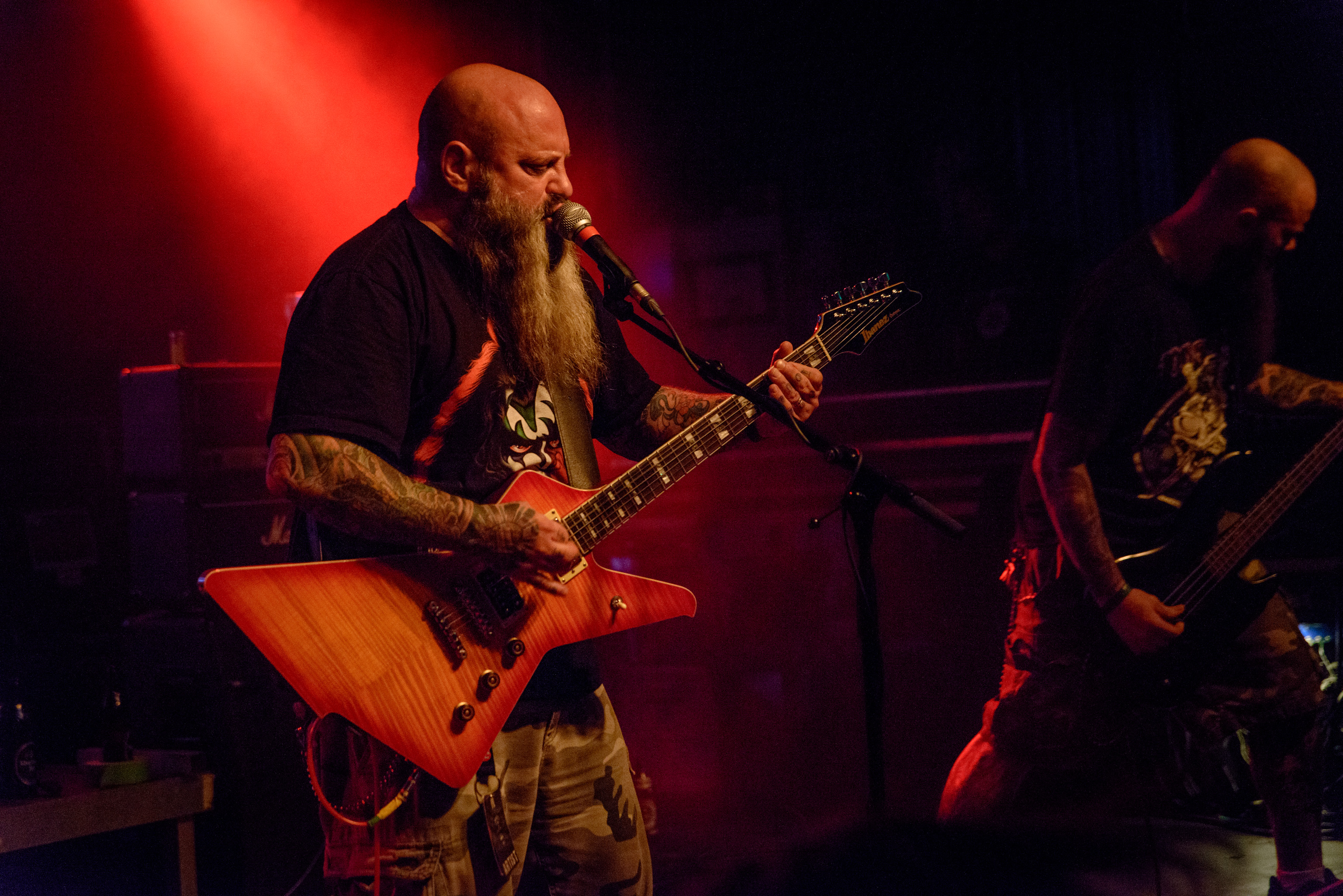
Sludge metal band Crowbar

Sludge metal began in the early–to–mid–1980s when hardcore punk bands like Black Flag and Flipper began slowing their tempos and incorporating elements of doom metal. This style then spread to Washington, where the Melvins would go on to be described by publications such as Revolver as the band that "invented sludge". By the 1990s, Louisiana developed one of the largest and influential sludge metal scenes, with bands like Acid Bath, Crowbar, Down and Eyehategod. Many sludge bands compose slow and heavy songs that contain brief hardcore passages. However, some bands emphasize fast tempos throughout their music. The string instruments are heavily distorted and are often played with large amounts of feedback to produce an abrasive, sludgy sound. Drumming is often performed in typical doom metal fashion, but drummers may employ hardcore d-beat or double-kick drumming during faster passages. Vocals are usually shouted or screamed, and lyrics are generally pessimistic in nature. Suffering, drug abuse, politics, and anger towards society are common lyrical themes.

==== Stoner metal ====
Stoner rock or stoner metal is typically slow-to-mid tempo, low-tuned, and bass-heavy. It combines elements of psychedelic rock, blues rock and doom metal, often with melodic vocals and 'retro' production. The genre emerged during the early 1990s, and was pioneered foremost by the Californian bands Kyuss and Sleep. Other prominent stoner metal bands include Acid King and Electric Wizard.

== Extreme metal ==
Extreme metal consists of a number of related heavy metal music subgenres that have developed since the early 1980s, usually characterized by a more abrasive, harsher, underground, non-commercialized style or sound nearly always associated with genres like black metal, death metal, doom metal, thrash metal, and sometimes speed metal. Extreme metal music is largely characterised by its sonic extremity. This can be seen in the genre’s utilisation of extreme forms of tempo (both slow and fast), unconventional song structures, sound-scapes of amplified distortion and vocal manipulations, and lyrical themes that include death, violence and the occult.

Extreme metal is by definition a counterculture. Though many extreme sub-styles are not very well known to mainstream music fans, extreme metal has influenced an array of musical performers inside and outside of heavy metal.

Examples of extreme metal bands include Meshuggah, Cradle of Filth, Celtic Frost, Strapping Young Lad, Dissection, and the first two albums of Venom.

== Folk metal ==
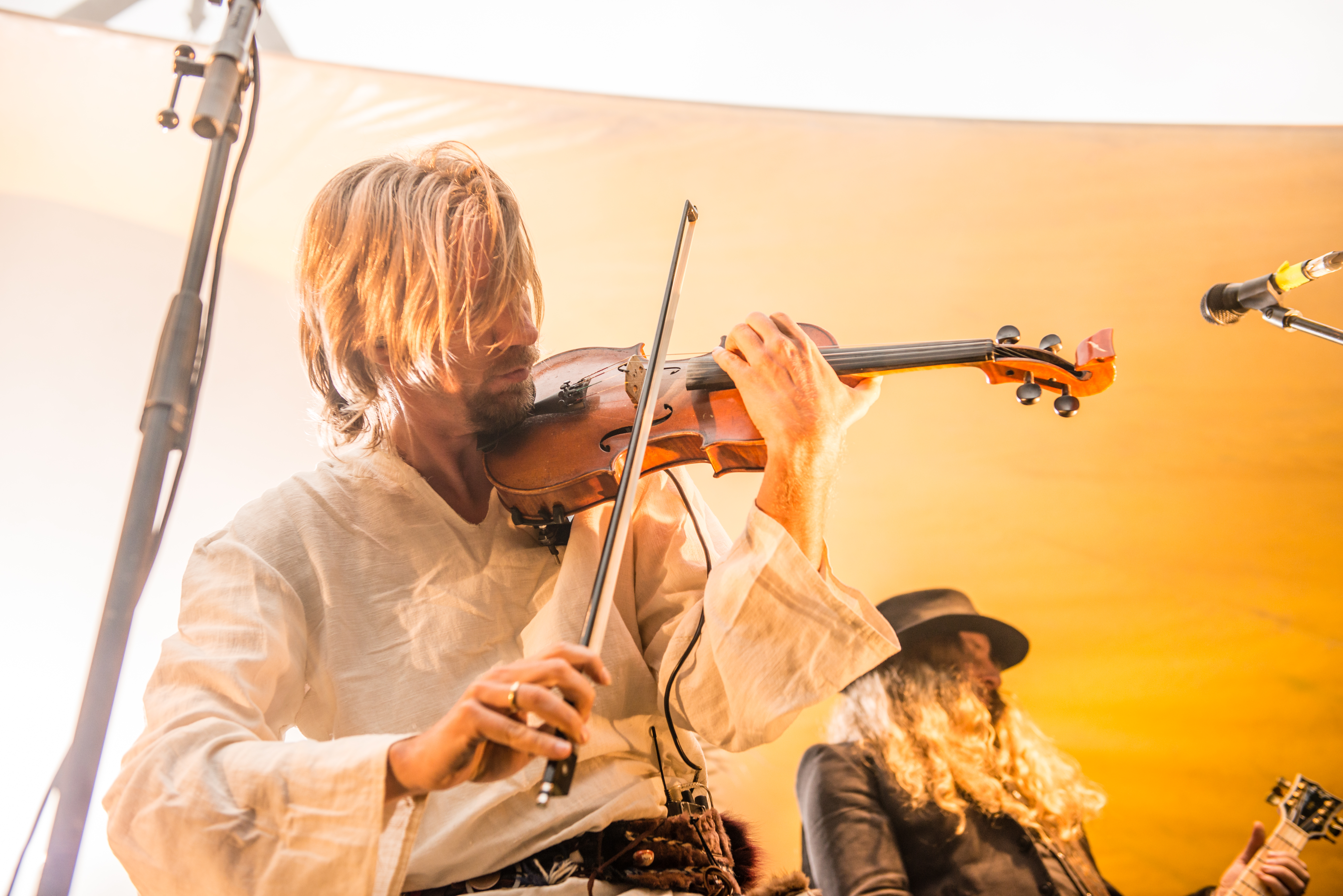
Folk and Viking metal band Korpiklaani

Folk metal is a subgenre of heavy metal that developed in Europe during the 1990s. As the name suggests, the genre is a fusion of heavy metal with traditional folk music. This includes the widespread use of folk instruments and, to a lesser extent, traditional singing styles (for example, Dutch band Heidevolk, Danish band Sylvatica and Spanish band Stone of Erech).

Folk metal is one of the youngest genres of metal. The earliest example of folk metal was the English band Golgotha, whose 1984 EP Dangerous Games contained a mixture of new wave of British heavy metal and folk styles. The genre was not further developed, however, until the emergence of another English band, Skyclad. Their debut album The Wayward Sons of Mother Earth was released in 1990. It was not until 1994 and 1995 that other early contributors in the genre began to emerge from different regions of Europe as well as in Israel. Among these early groups, the Irish band Cruachan and the German band Subway to Sally each spearheaded a different regional variation that over time became known as Celtic metal and medieval metal respectively. Despite their contributions, folk metal remained little known with few representatives during the 1990s. It was not until the early 2000s when the genre exploded into prominence, particularly in Finland, with the efforts of such groups as Finntroll, Ensiferum, Korpiklaani, Turisas, and Moonsorrow.

The music of folk metal is characterized by its diversity, with bands known to perform different styles of both heavy metal music and folk music. A large variety of folk instruments are used in the genre with many bands consequently featuring six or more members in their regular line-ups. A few bands are also known to rely on keyboards to simulate the sound of folk instruments. Lyrics in the genre commonly deal with mythology, history, and nature.

=== Derivatives of folk metal ===
==== Celtic metal ====
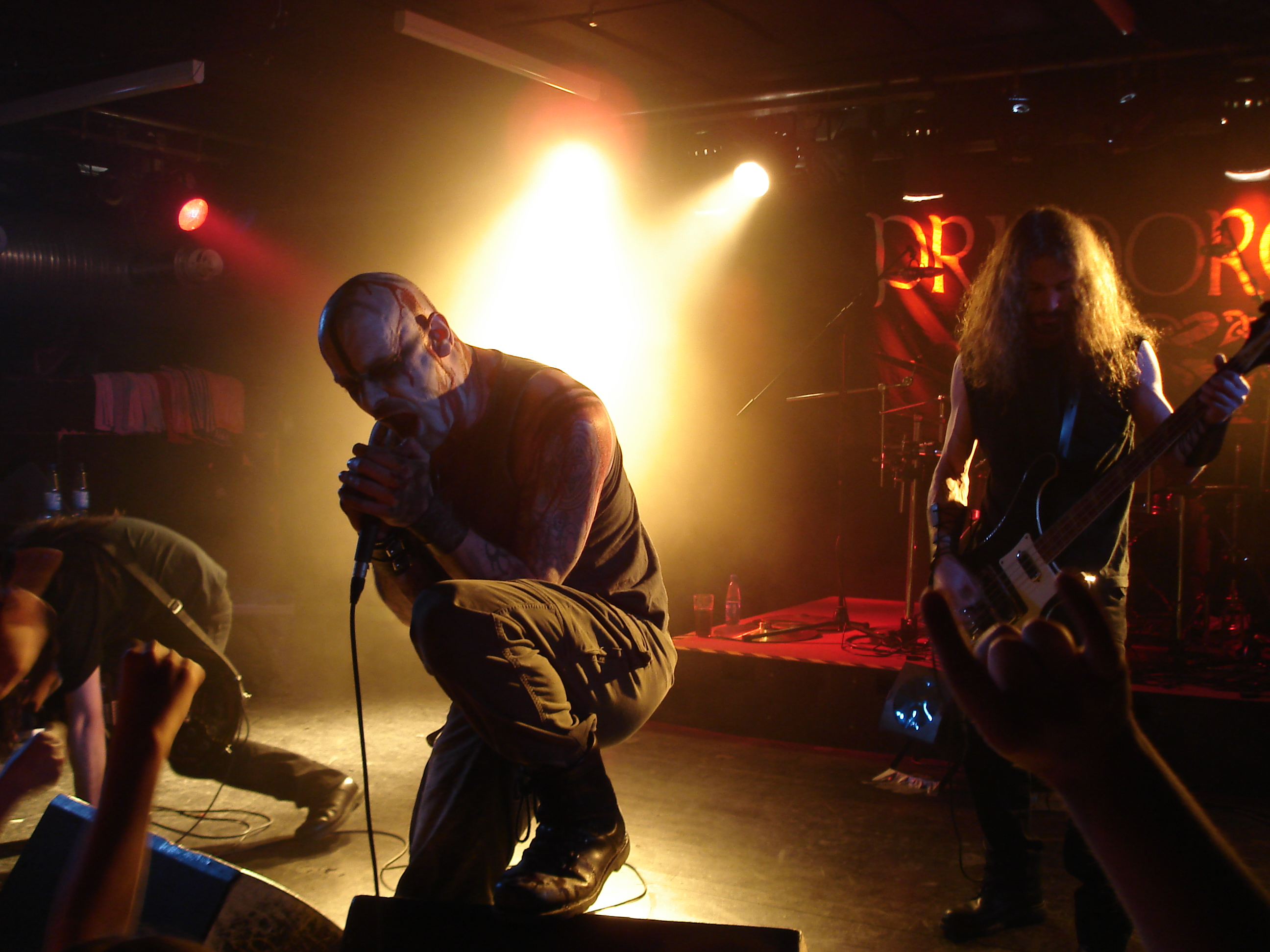
Celtic and pagan metal band Primordial

Celtic metal is a subgenre of folk metal that developed in the 1990s in Ireland. As the name suggests, the genre is a fusion of heavy metal music and Celtic music. The early pioneers of the genre were the three Irish bands Cruachan, Primordial and Waylander. The genre has since expanded beyond Irish shores and is known to be performed today by bands from numerous other countries.

==== Pirate metal ====
Pirate metal is a subgenre of folk metal that blends heavy metal, thrash metal, and sometimes speed metal with pirate mythology, and, commonly, elements of sea shanties. The style was influenced heavily by German heavy metal band Running Wild and its third studio album, Under Jolly Roger. Popular Pirate metal bands include Alestorm and Swashbuckle.

==== Pagan metal ====
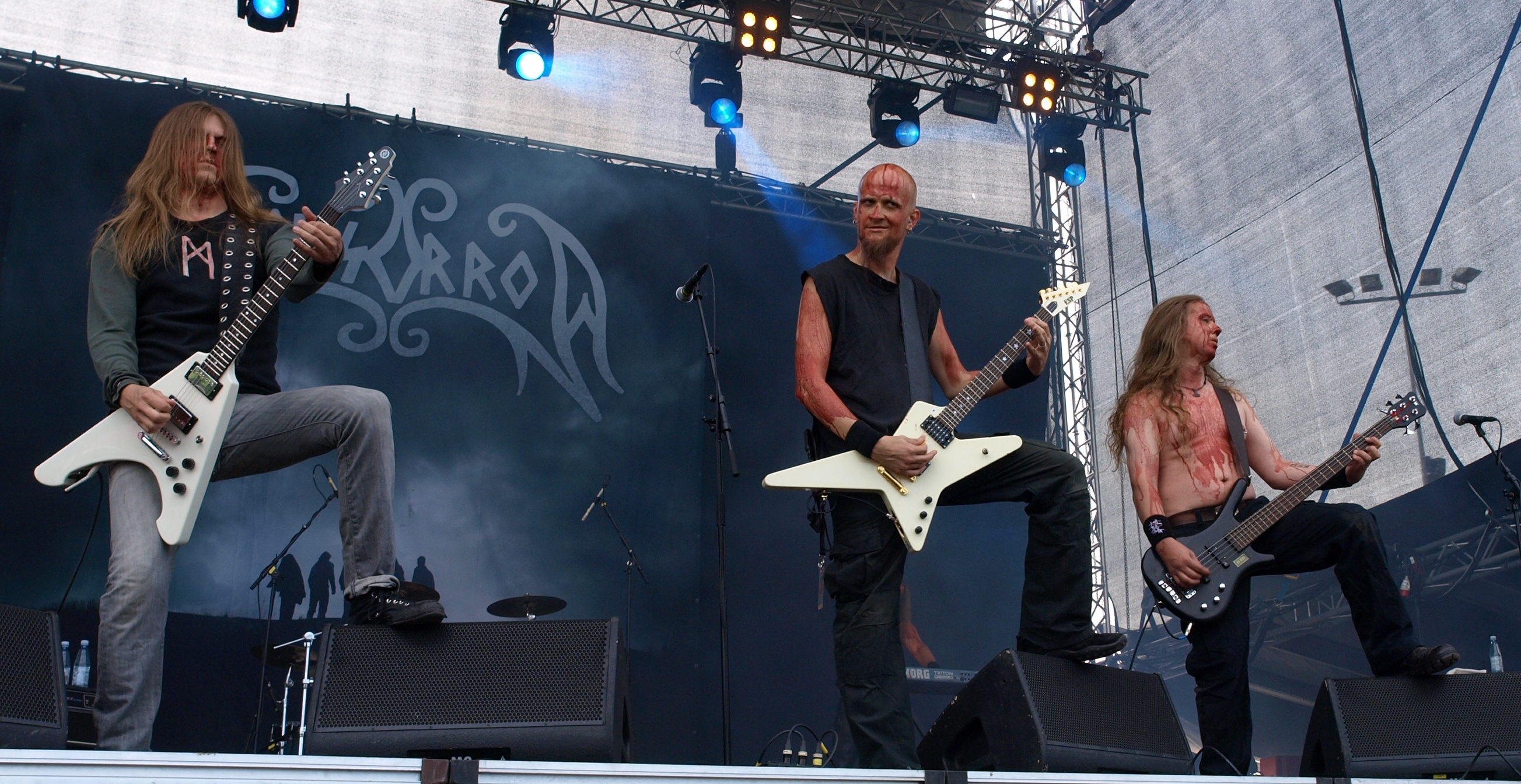
Folk, pagan, and Viking metal band Moonsorrow

Pagan metal is heavy metal music which fuses extreme metal with "the pre-Christian traditions of a specific culture or region through thematic concept, rustic melodies, unusual instruments or archaic languages", usually referring to folk metal or black metal. The Norwegian band In the Woods... was one of the first bands commonly viewed as pagan metal. Metal Hammer author Marc Halupczok wrote that Primordial's song "To Enter Pagan" from the band's demo "Dark Romanticism" contributed to defining the genre. Pagan metal bands are often associated with Viking metal and folk metal. Bands such as Moonsorrow and Kampfar have been identified as fitting within all three of those genres.

== Glam metal ==
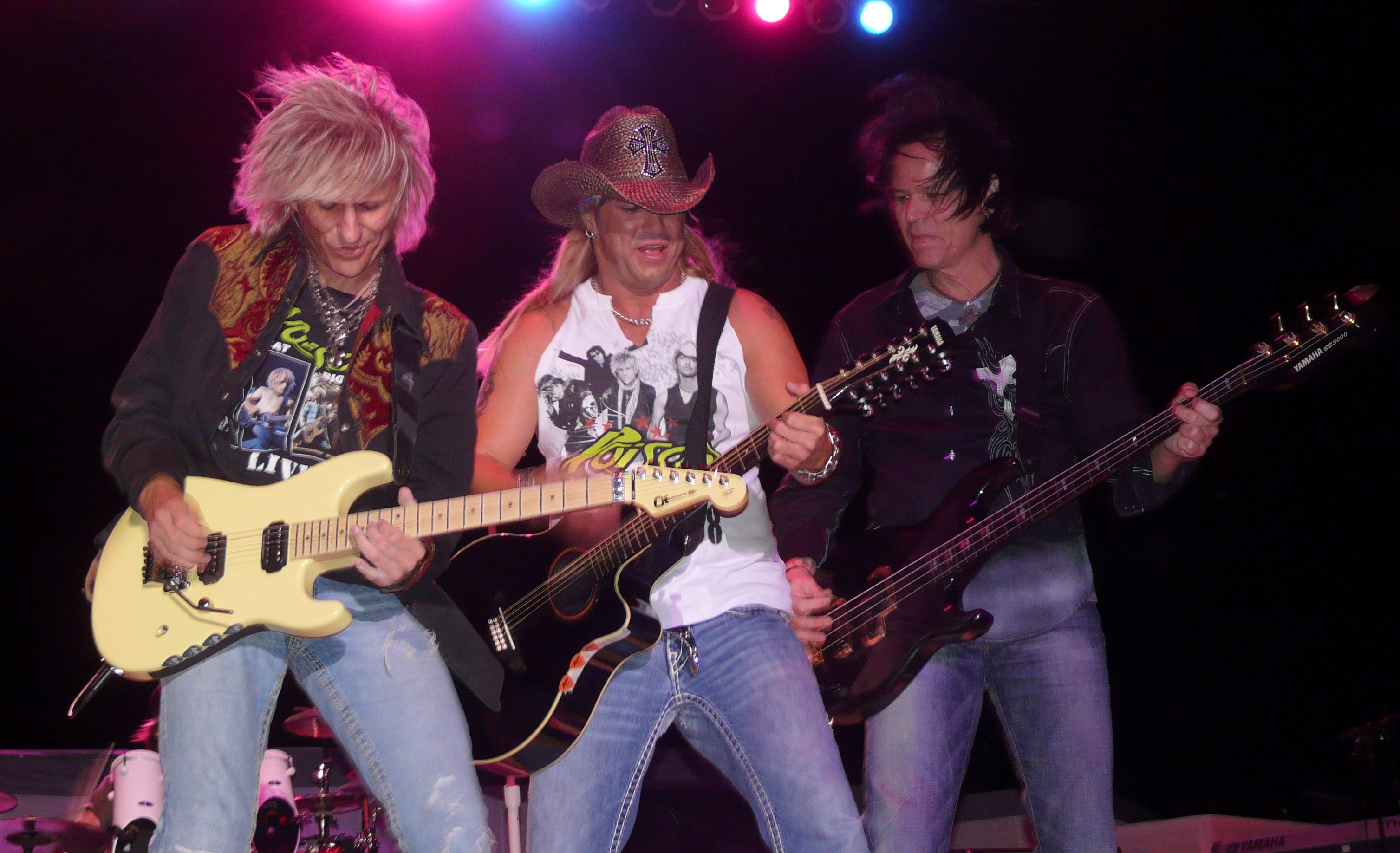
Glam metal band Poison

Glam metal (also known as hair metal or Pop metal) is the visual style of certain heavy metal bands that arose in the late 1970s and early 1980s in the United States, particularly on the Los Angeles Sunset Strip music scene. It was popular throughout the 1980s and briefly in the early 1990s, combining the flamboyant look of glam rock and playing a commercial hard rock/heavy metal musical style. The term Hair bands was popularized by MTV in the 1990s and derives from the tendency among glam metal acts to style their long hair in a teased-up fashion. Many of the bands donned make-up to achieve an androgynous look, similar to that of some 1970s glam rock acts. Mötley Crüe, Stryper, Bon Jovi, Poison and Ratt are examples of bands who adopted the glam metal look in their stage attire and their music video imagery. Newer bands include Black Veil Brides and Steel Panther.

== Gothic metal ==
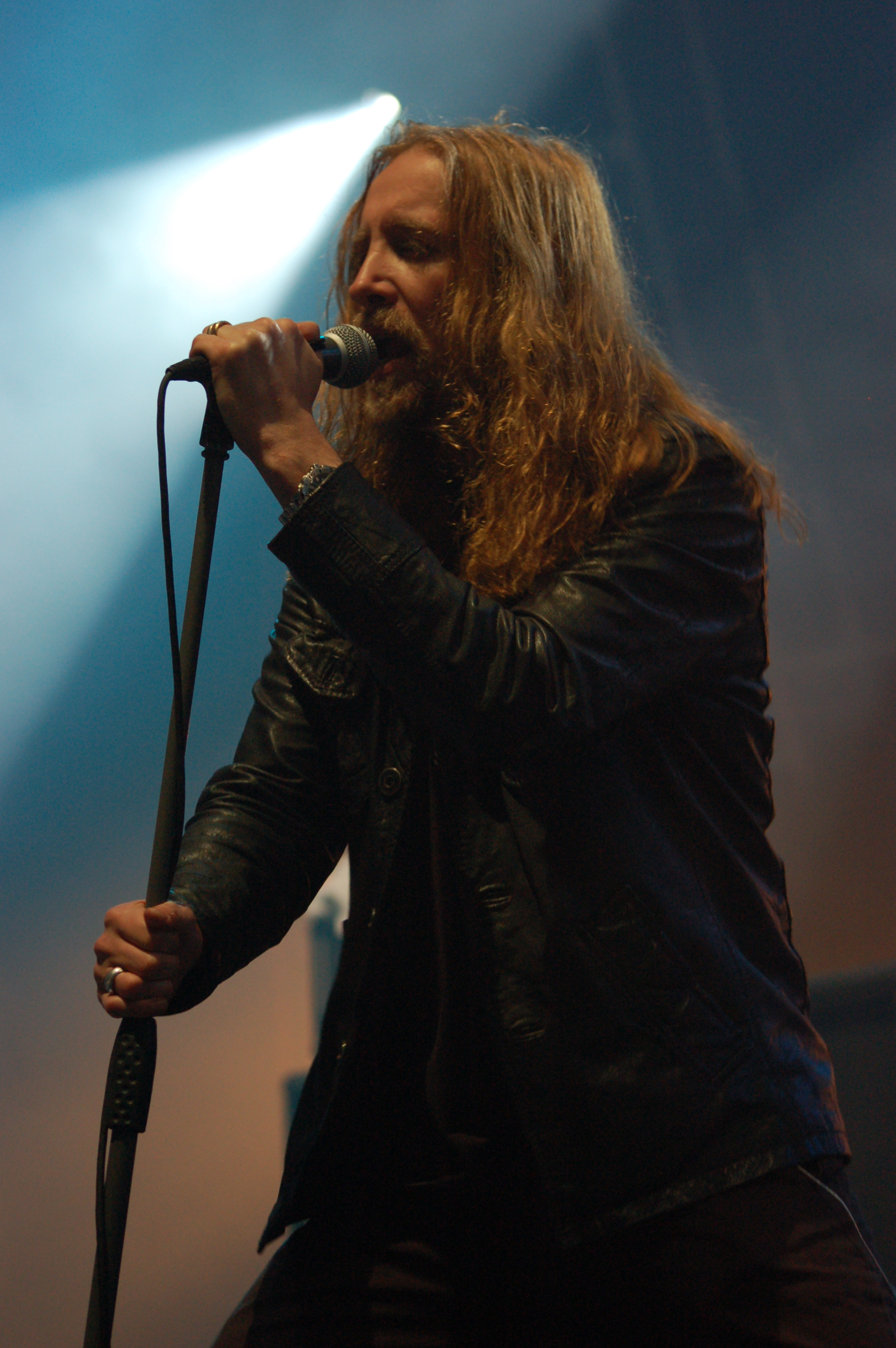
Nick Holmes of Gothic metal band Paradise Lost

Gothic metal is characterized as a combination of the dark atmospheres of gothic rock and dark wave with the heaviness of doom metal. The genre originated during the mid-1990s in Europe as an outgrowth of death-doom, a fusion genre of doom metal and death metal. Pioneers of Gothic metal include Paradise Lost, My Dying Bride and Anathema, all from the North of England. Other pioneers from the first half of the 1990s include Type O Negative from the United States, Tiamat from Sweden and The Gathering from the Netherlands. Examples of gothic metal bands include Paradise Lost, My Dying Bride, Anathema, Tiamat, Type O Negative, Moonspell, Theatre of Tragedy, Lacrimosa and Lacuna Coil.

== Grindcore ==
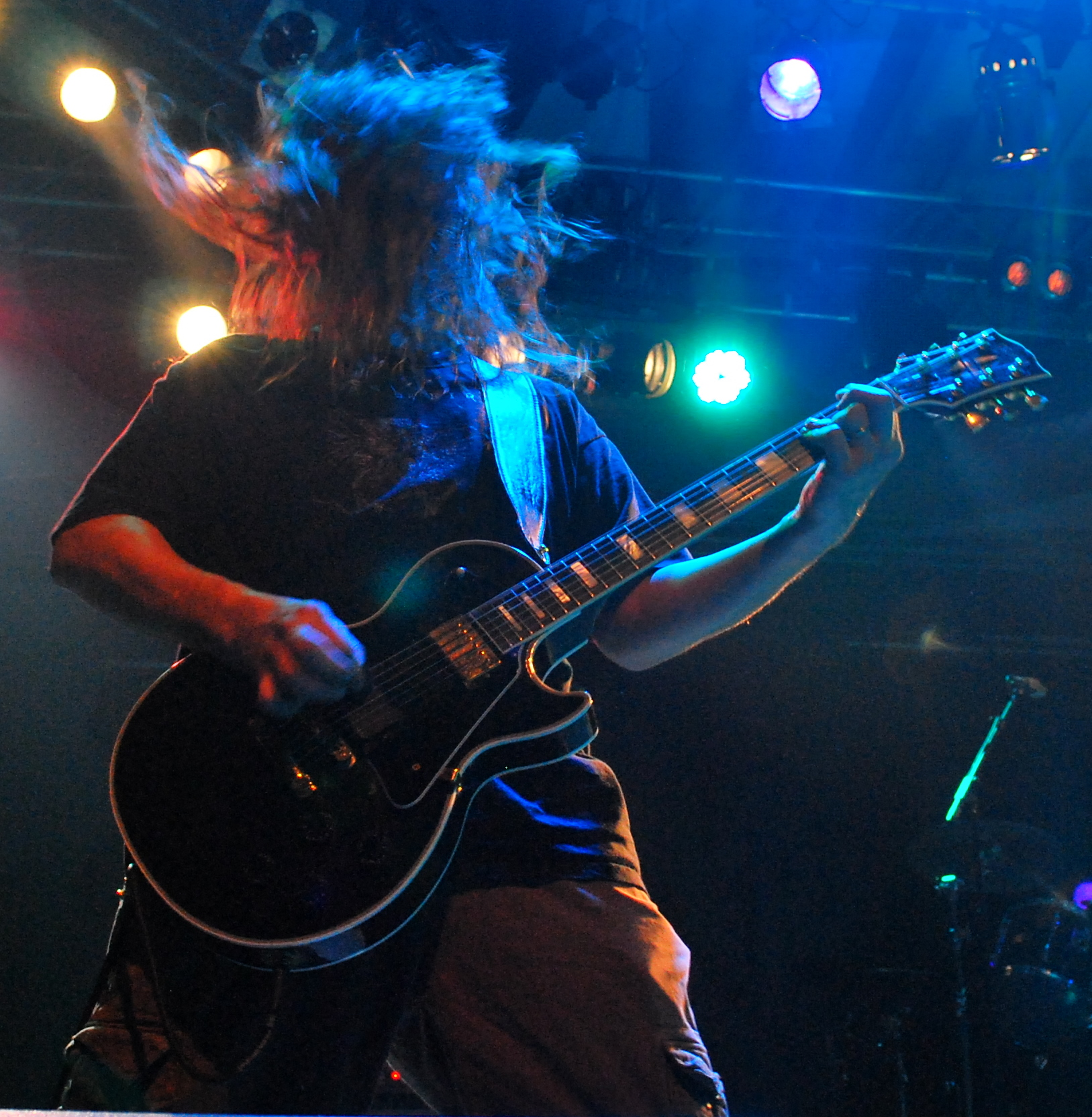
Mitch Harris of grindcore band Napalm Death

Grindcore is a fusion of crust punk, hardcore punk, and thrash metal or death metal. It is characterized by growling vocals, blast beats, and incredibly short songs with lyrics that are often focused on gore and violence, though sometimes the lyrics can be political. Grindcore, in contrast to death metal, is often very chaotic, and lacks the standard use of time signatures. The style was pioneered by the British band Napalm Death in the eighties. Other notable grindcore bands include Brutal Truth, Agoraphobic Nosebleed, and Pig Destroyer.

=== Derivatives of grindcore ===
==== Deathgrind ====
Deathgrind, sometimes written as death-grind or death/grind, is a musical genre that fuses death metal and grindcore. Deathgrind has been described as "grindcore and brutal death metal colliding head on." Danny Lilker described deathgrind as "combining the technicality of death metal with the intensity of grindcore." Death/grind emphasizes overall musical brutality with a specific focus on fast tempos and retains grindcore's traditional abruptness. Notable bands include Cattle Decapitation and Misery Index.

==== Goregrind ====
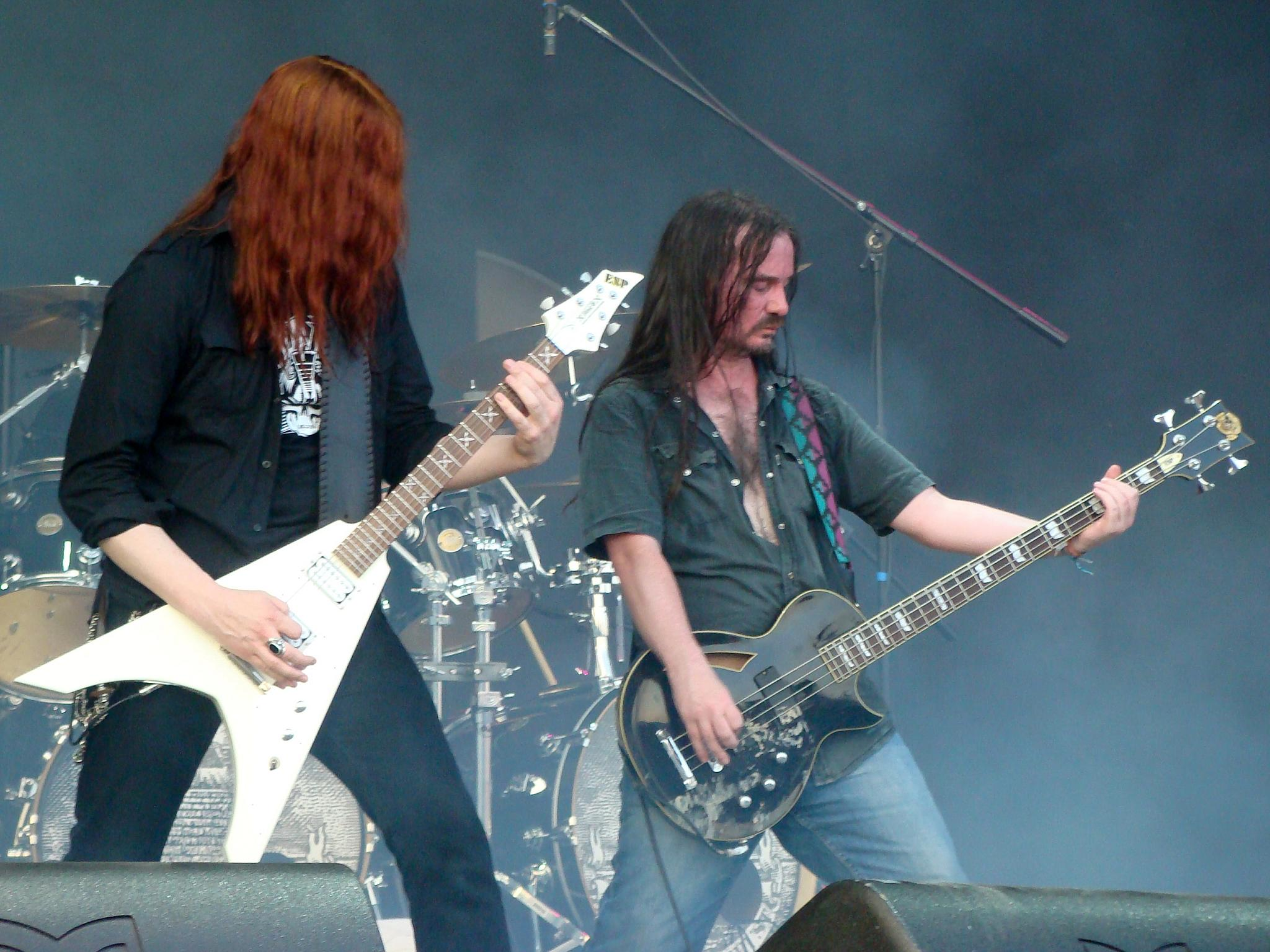
Goregrind band Carcass

Goregrind is a subgenre of grindcore and death metal. Early examples of the genre include Repulsion's Horrified, Impetigo's Ultimo Mondo Cannibale, and the first two studio albums of Carcass, which defined the genre. In its Reek of Putrefaction-era, Carcass used pitch shifters, medical imagery, and, in a deviation from the frequently political or left-wing lyrics commonly used in the hardcore punk and grindcore scenes, gory, anatomical references in its lyrics.

==== Pornogrind ====
Pornogrind, also known as porno grind, porno-grind or porn grind, is a musical subgenre of grindcore and death metal, which lyrically deals with sexual themes. Natalie Purcell's book Death Metal Music: The Passion and Politics of a Subculture, suggests that pornogrind is defined solely on the basis of its lyrical content and unique imagery, its focus on pornographic content. Purcell notes that bands like Gut include "simpler, slower, and more rock-like songs". The artwork for pornogrind bands' albums is noted for its extreme and potentially offensive nature, which "would keep them out of most stores". an example of the genre is Cock and Ball Torture.

==== Electrogrind ====
The 21st century also saw the development of "electrogrind" (or "cybergrind"), practiced by The Berzerker, Body Hammer, Gigantic Brain and Genghis Tron which borrows from electronic music. These groups built on the work of Agoraphobic Nosebleed, Enemy Soil and The Locust, as well as industrial metal. The Berzerker also appropriated the distorted Roland TR-909 kick drums of gabber producers. Many later electrogrind groups were caricatured for their hipster connections.

== Industrial metal ==
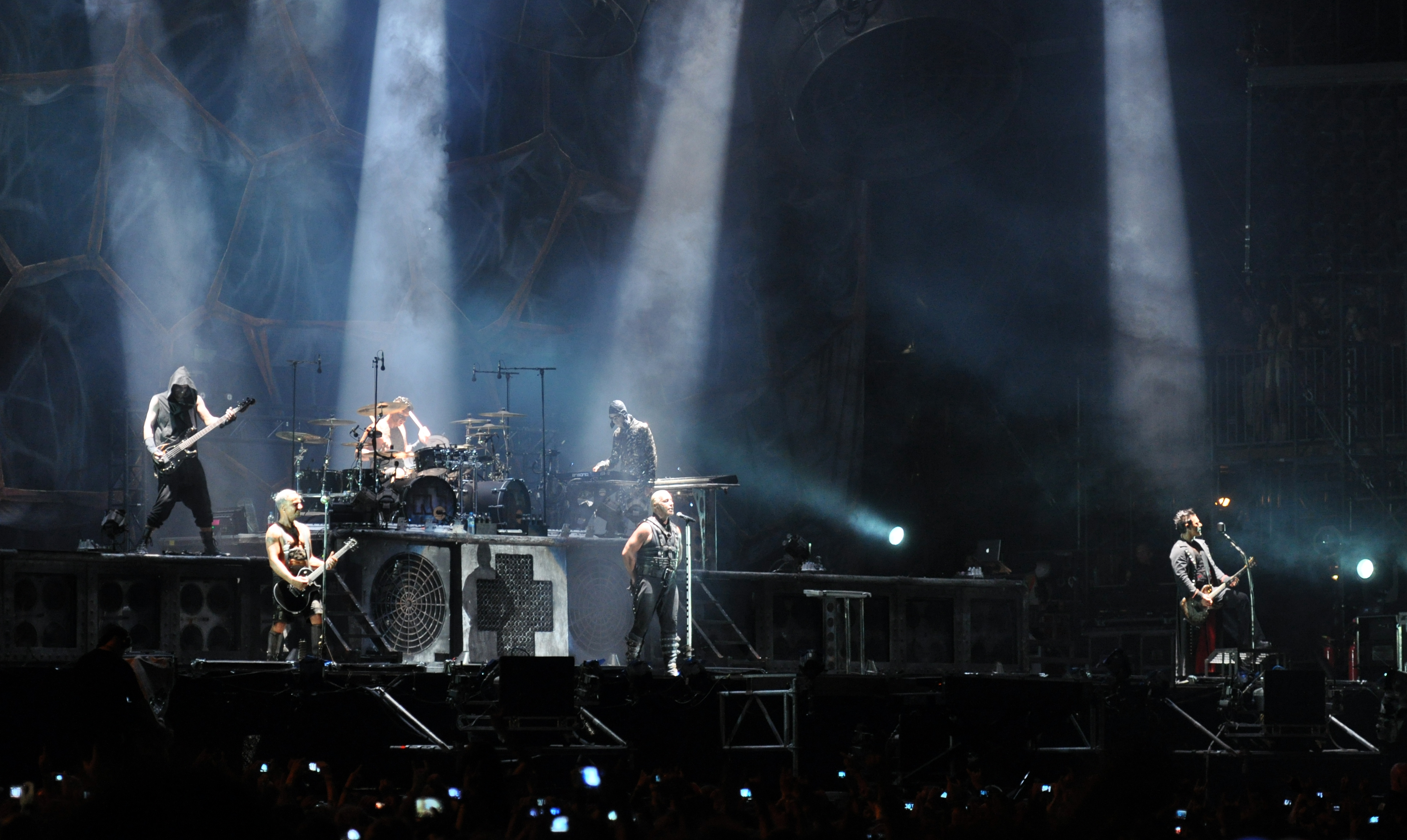
Industrial metal band Rammstein

Industrial metal combines elements of industrial music and heavy metal. It is usually centered around repetitive metal guitar riffs, sampling, synthesizer or sequencer lines, and distorted vocals. Prominent industrial metal groups include Rammstein, Ministry, Nine Inch Nails, KMFDM, Fear Factory, Marilyn Manson, Rob Zombie and Godflesh.

=== Industrial death metal ===
Some musicians emerging from the death metal scene, such as Fear Factory, Nailbomb, Autokrator and Meathook Seed, also began to experiment with industrial. Fear Factory, from Los Angeles, were initially influenced by the Earache roster (namely Godflesh, Napalm Death and Bolt Thrower). The German band Oomph!, after their second album Sperm, started to play industrial metal combined with elements of death metal and groove metal, until the album Plastik. Sepultura singer Max Cavalera's Nailbomb, a collaboration with Alex Newport, also practiced a combination of extreme metal and industrial production techniques. A lesser-known example of industrial death metal is Meathook Seed, made up of members of Napalm Death and the Florida death metal group Obituary. An industrial music fan, Obituary guitarist Trevor Peres suggested drum machines for The End Complete, Obituary's most successful album. The other band members' refusal led him to form Meathook Seed.

=== Industrial black metal ===
In the early years of the 21st century, groups from the black metal scene began to incorporate elements of industrial music. Mysticum, formed in 1991, was the first of these groups. The most famous scene was Samel, who went from pure black metal to a sound that breathed industrial air into their album Passage. Industrial Black Metal combines the original black metal vocals with black metal and industrial percussion elements. DHG (Dødheimsgard), Thorns from Norway, and Blut Aus Nord, N.K.V.D. and Blacklodge from France, have been acclaimed for their incorporation of industrial elements.

== Kawaii metal ==
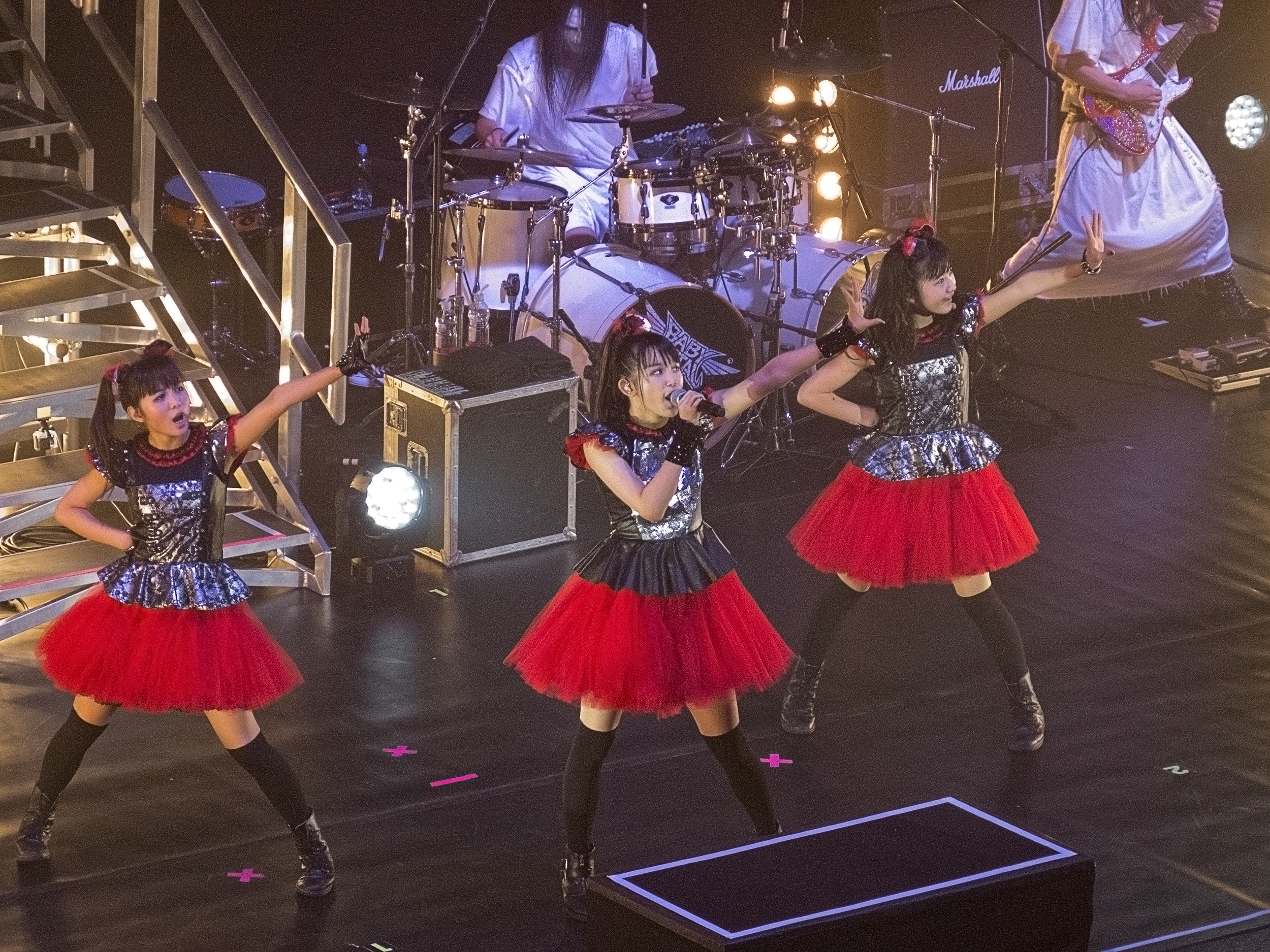
Kawaii metal band Babymetal

At its core, Kawaii metal (also known as idol metal or cute metal) fuses aspects of heavy metal and J-pop, however usually uses elements of power metal mixed with industrial metal keyboards and synthesizers, japanese idol aesthetic and vocals, shredding guitar solos and flashing drums with occasional usage of melodic death metal and post-hardcore unclean vocals and traditional Japanese musical instruments. Kawaii metal grew out of the japanese idol in the late 2000s and early 2010s, being pioneered by bands like Dazzle Vision, Babymetal and Ladybaby.

== Latin metal ==
Latin metal is a genre of metal music with Latin origins, influences, and instrumentation, such as Spanish vocals, Latin percussion and rhythm such as Salsa rhythm. Prominent bands in this genre include A.N.I.M.A.L., Ill Niño, Nonpoint, and Soulfly.

== Metalcore ==
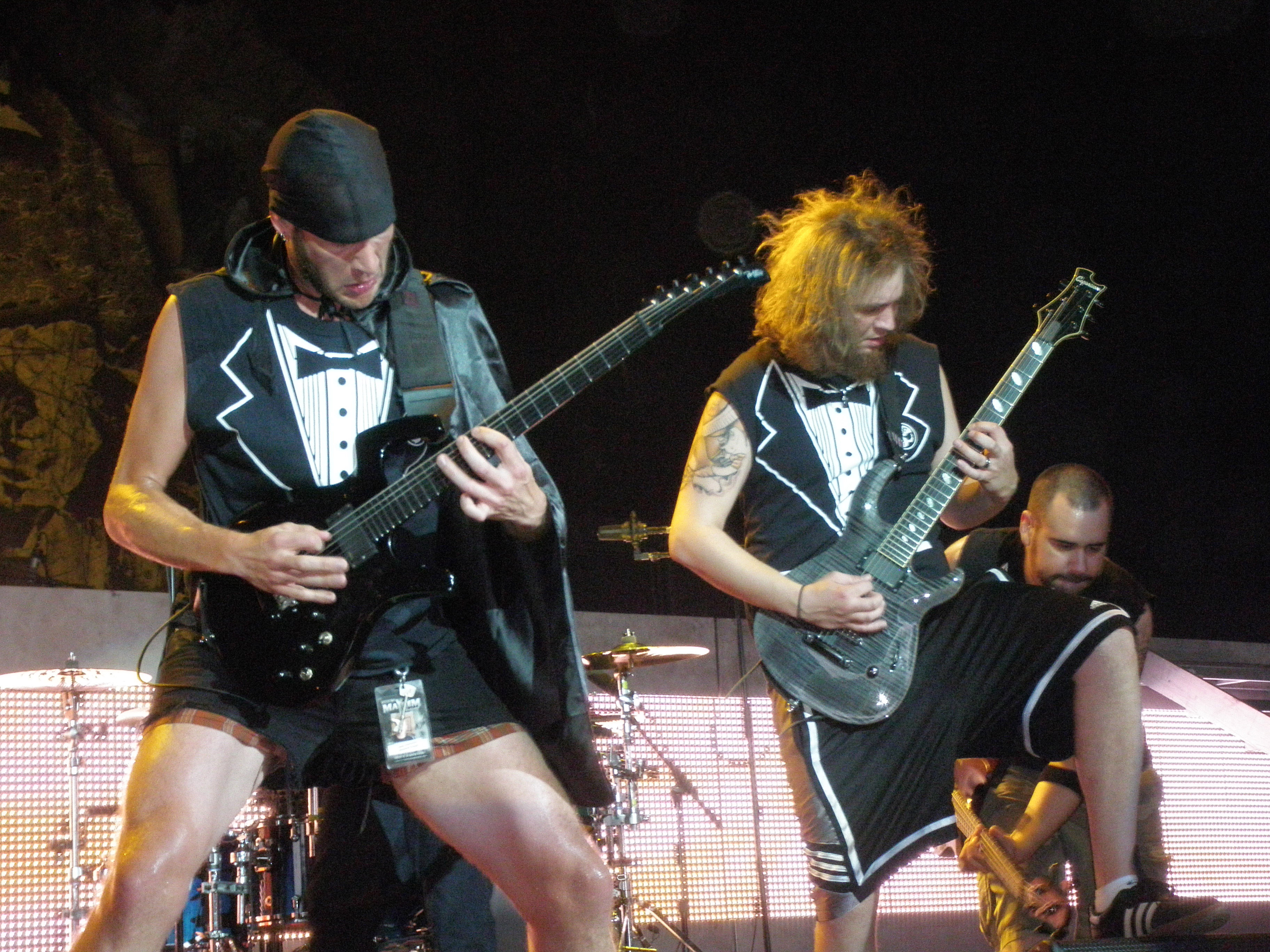
Metalcore band Killswitch Engage

Metalcore combines heavy metal and hardcore punk. Generally, metalcore guitarists use heavy guitar riffs and solos, drummers frequently use hardcore blast beats and double bass drums, and vocalists use a vocal style which includes death growls and screaming. As with melodic metalcore, some later bands originating in the 21st century combine both harsh and clean vocals. A distinguishing characteristic is the "breakdown", whereby the song is slowed to half-time, and the guitarists play open strings to achieve the lowest-pitched sound. Prominent metalcore bands include Hatebreed, Bury Your Dead, Killswitch Engage, Architects, While She Sleeps, Bleeding Through, Integrity, Unearth, and Parkway Drive. Original metalcore bands from the 1990s included Earth Crisis, Hatebreed, Integrity and Converge. More modern bands include Killswitch Engage, Underoath, All That Remains, Trivium, As I Lay Dying, Bullet for My Valentine, Asking Alexandria, Shadows Fall, Unearth, Atreyu, and Bleeding Through.

=== Subgenres of metalcore ===
==== Melodic metalcore ====
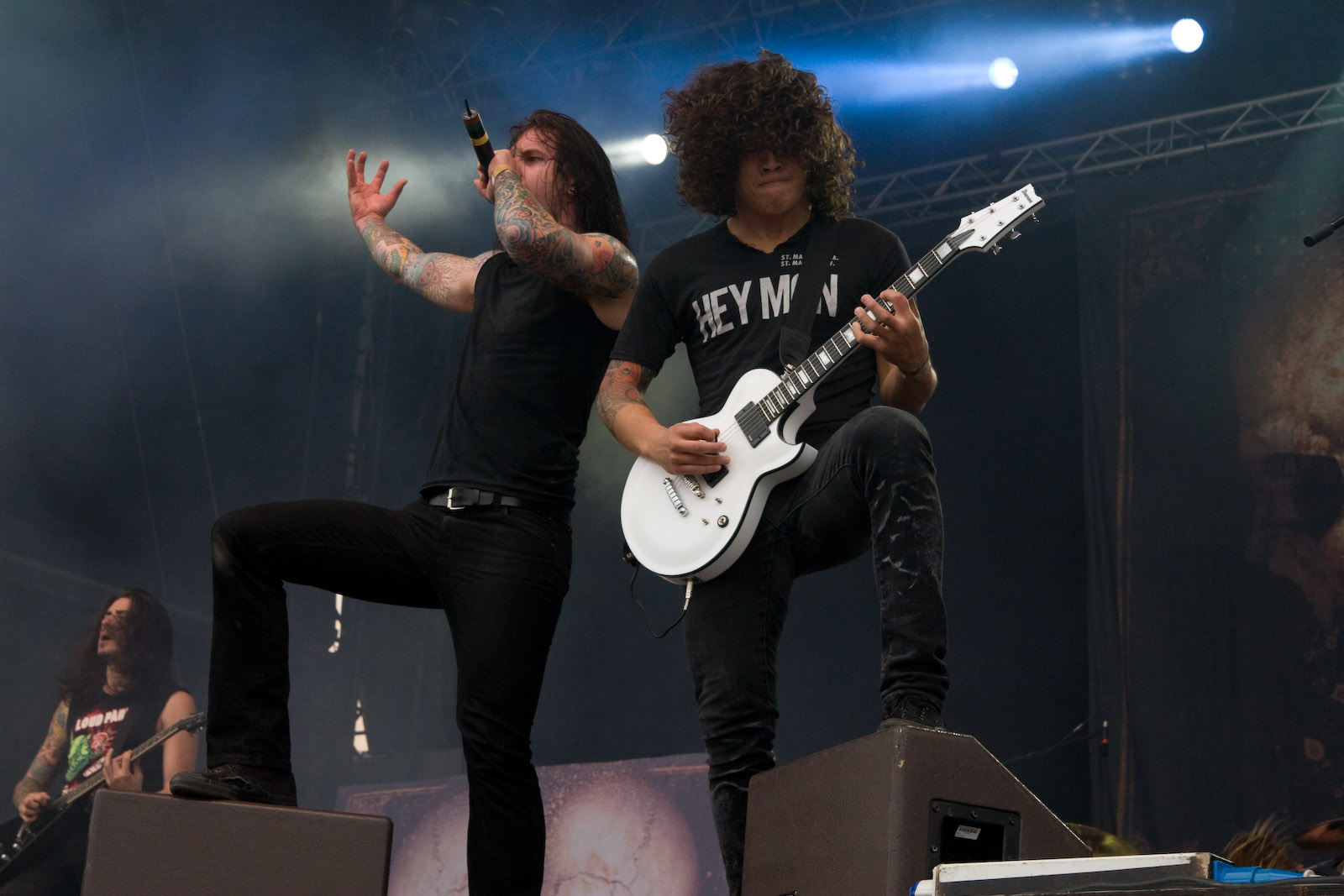
Melodic metalcore band As I Lay Dying

Melodic metalcore is a fusion genre which combines sounds and traits from melodic death metal with hardcore punk, metalcore and occasionally emo. Melodic metalcore bands include Trivium, All That Remains, Atreyu, Bullet for My Valentine, Bury Tomorrow, Darkest Hour, Asking Alexandria, As I Lay Dying, August Burns Red and The Devil Wears Prada.

Melodic metalcore bands have big influences, guitar riffs, and writing styles from Swedish melodic death metal bands, such as At the Gates, Arch Enemy, In Flames and Soilwork. They tend to have strong use of instrumental melody. Many melodic metalcore vocalists use clean singing techniques, as well as growls and screaming. It also can feature harmonic guitar riffs, tremolo picking, double bass drums and metalcore-stylized breakdowns. Some bands also may feature guitar solos. A few of these groups, like Shadows Fall, have some appreciation for 1980s glam metal. Melodic metalcore groups have been described as "embrac[ing] '80s metal clichés", such as "inordinate amounts of smoke machines, rippin' solos, [and] three bass drums."

==== Deathcore ====
Deathcore combines elements of death metal with elements of metalcore or hardcore punk, or both. It is defined by an "excessive" use of death metal riffs, blast beats and use of hardcore punk breakdowns. Some prominent bands include the Acacia Strain, Carnifex, Despised Icon, Suicide Silence, Rings of Saturn, Thy Art is Murder, Lorna Shore and Whitechapel.

==== Mathcore ====
Mathcore is a rhythmically complex and dissonant style of heavy metal and hardcore punk, though many groups draw mainly from metalcore. It has its roots in bands such as Converge, Botch, and The Dillinger Escape Plan. The term mathcore is suggested by analogy with math rock. Both math rock and mathcore make use of unusual time signatures. Prominent mathcore groups have been associated with grindcore.

==== Electronicore ====
Electronicore (also known as synthcore or trancecore) is fusion genre of metalcore with elements of various electronic music genres, such as trance, electronica, and dubstep. The term electronicore is a portmanteau of electronic and metalcore. Notable artists of this genre have originated from the United Kingdom (Asking Alexandria), the United States (I See Stars, Sky Eats Airplane), Australia, Canada (Abandon All Ships), France, Ukraine (Make Me Famous), Hong Kong (BLAK, Soul Of Ears), Japan (Crossfaith), South Korea (In Your Face), and Malaysia (Sekumpulan Orang Gila).

==== Nu metalcore ====
Nu metalcore (sometimes referred to as nu metal revival or new nu metal) is the fusion genre of nu metal and metalcore that began in the 2000s, and gained popularity in the 2010s. Some of the notable groups have also taken influence from R&B, industrial metal, post-hardcore, and deathcore.

==== Progressive metalcore ====
Progressive metalcore (also called technical metalcore or ambient metalcore) is a fusion of progressive metal and metalcore, characterized by highly technical lead guitar, "atmospheric" elements, and complex instrumentation.

== Neoclassical metal ==
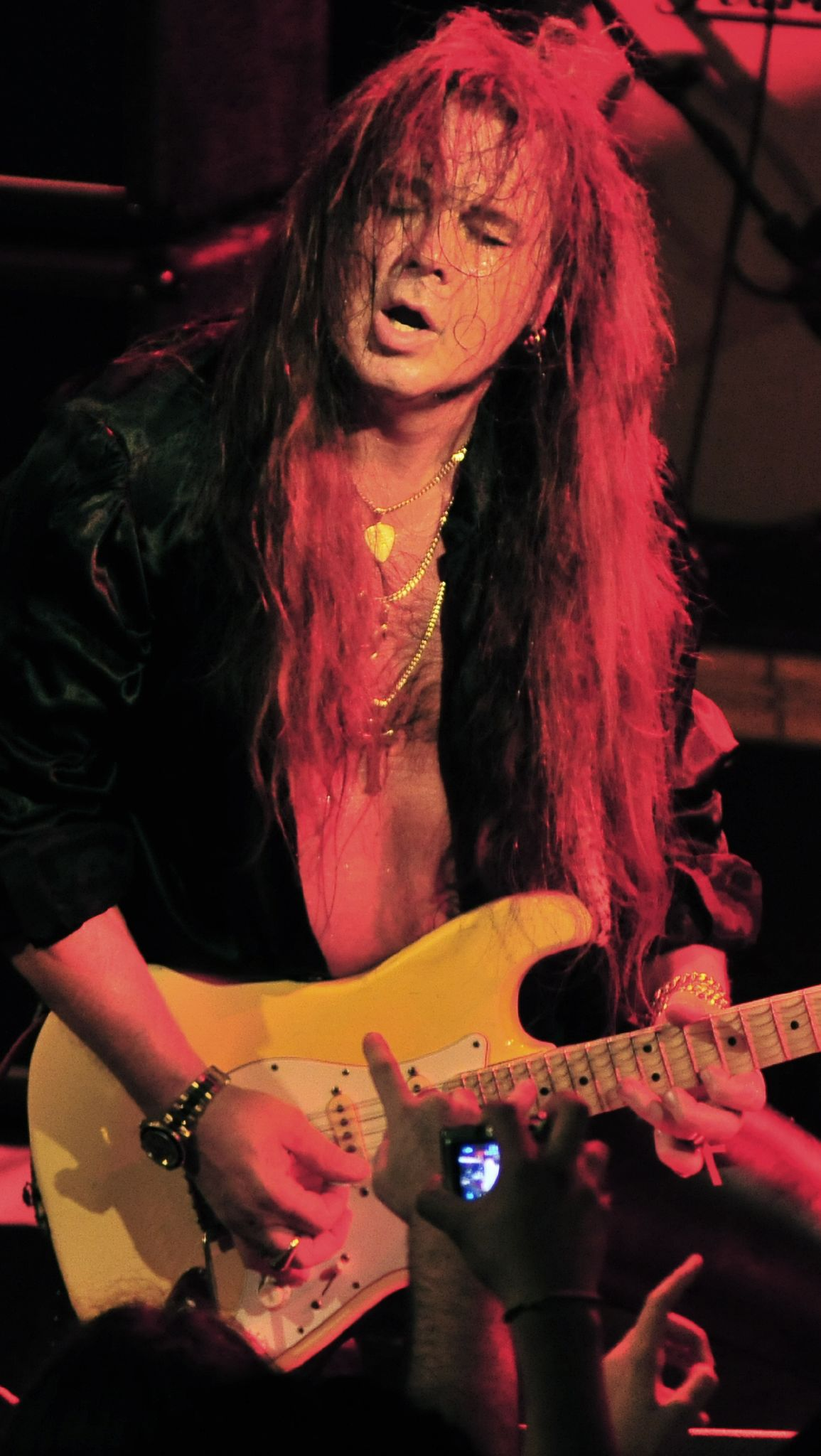
Neoclassical metal musician Yngwie Malmsteen

Neoclassical metal, also known as shred metal, is a subgenre that is heavily influenced by classical music in its style of composition. It uses a very technical style of guitar soloing called shred guitar, in which guitarists use crosspicking, sweep picking, and economy picking to play rapid scales and arpeggios. As well, it uses elements borrowed from classical music; including instruments, scales and melodies. Yngwie J. Malmsteen, Tony MacAlpine, and Vinnie Moore are prominent performers in this genre.

== Neue Deutsche Härte ==
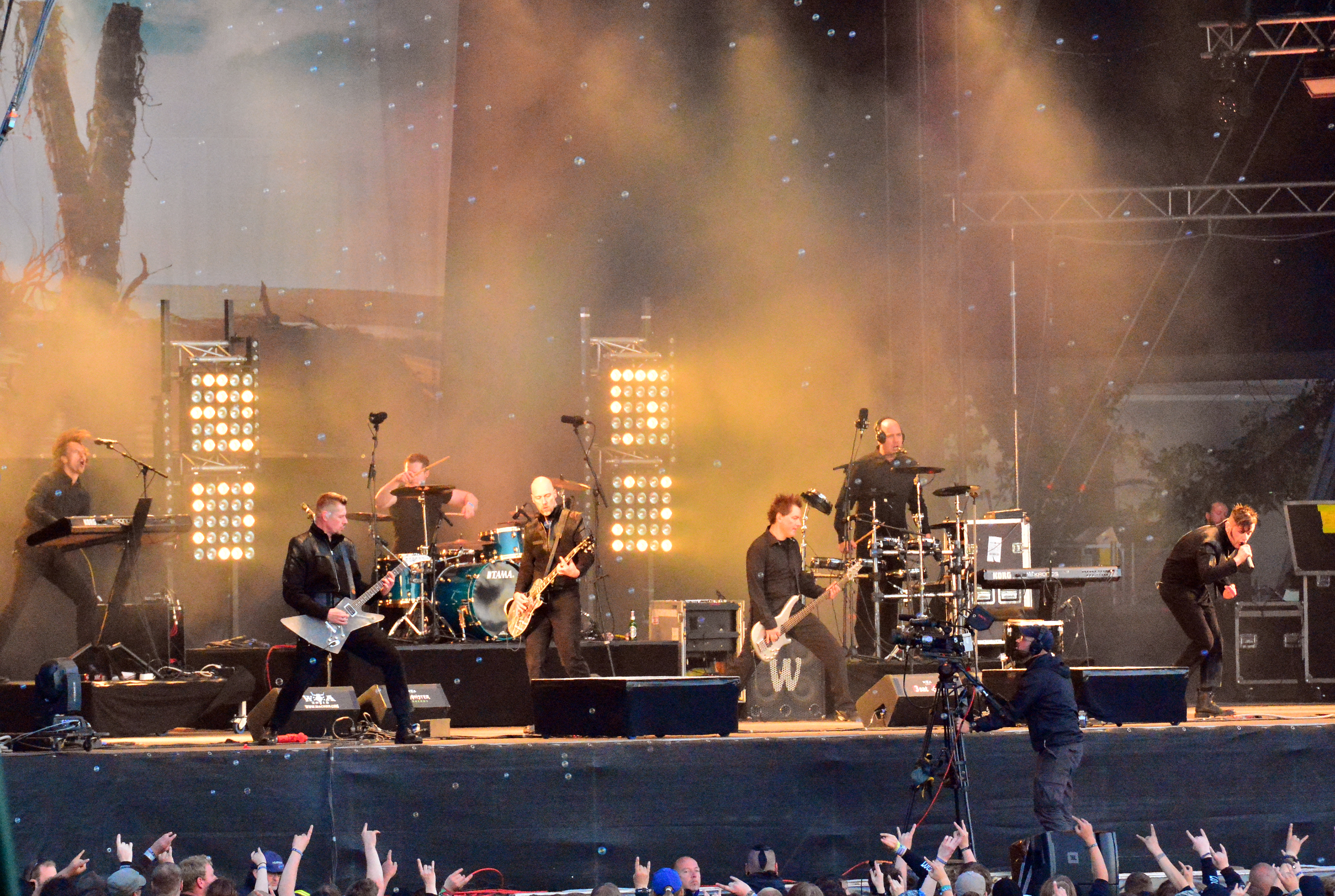
Neue Deutsche Härte band Oomph!

Neue Deutsche Härte ("New German Hardness") describes a crossover style that is influenced by New German Wave, alternative metal, and groove metal, combining it with elements from industrial, electronica, and techno. The lyrics are generally in German, and dance metal is the term most commonly used to describe Neue Deutsche Härte songs sung in other languages. NDH uses the basic setup of instruments for metal: electric guitar, bass guitar, drums, and vocals, along with keyboard, synthesizers, samples, and occasionally, additional percussion. Emphasis is on a demonstration of predominance, by over-pronouncing certain syllables and letters (such as the uvular or alveolar trill). The vocals are thus dominantly presented in deep, male, and clean voice. Some bands use screaming and death growls, which is also common, being heard in certain songs by Oomph!, Rammstein, Stahlhammer, Samsas Traum and Megaherz. NDH imagery is often strongly masculine, and at times militaristic, depending on the group and the song. Guitars are tuned low, usually to drop D or C, and are generally heavily distorted.

== Post-metal ==
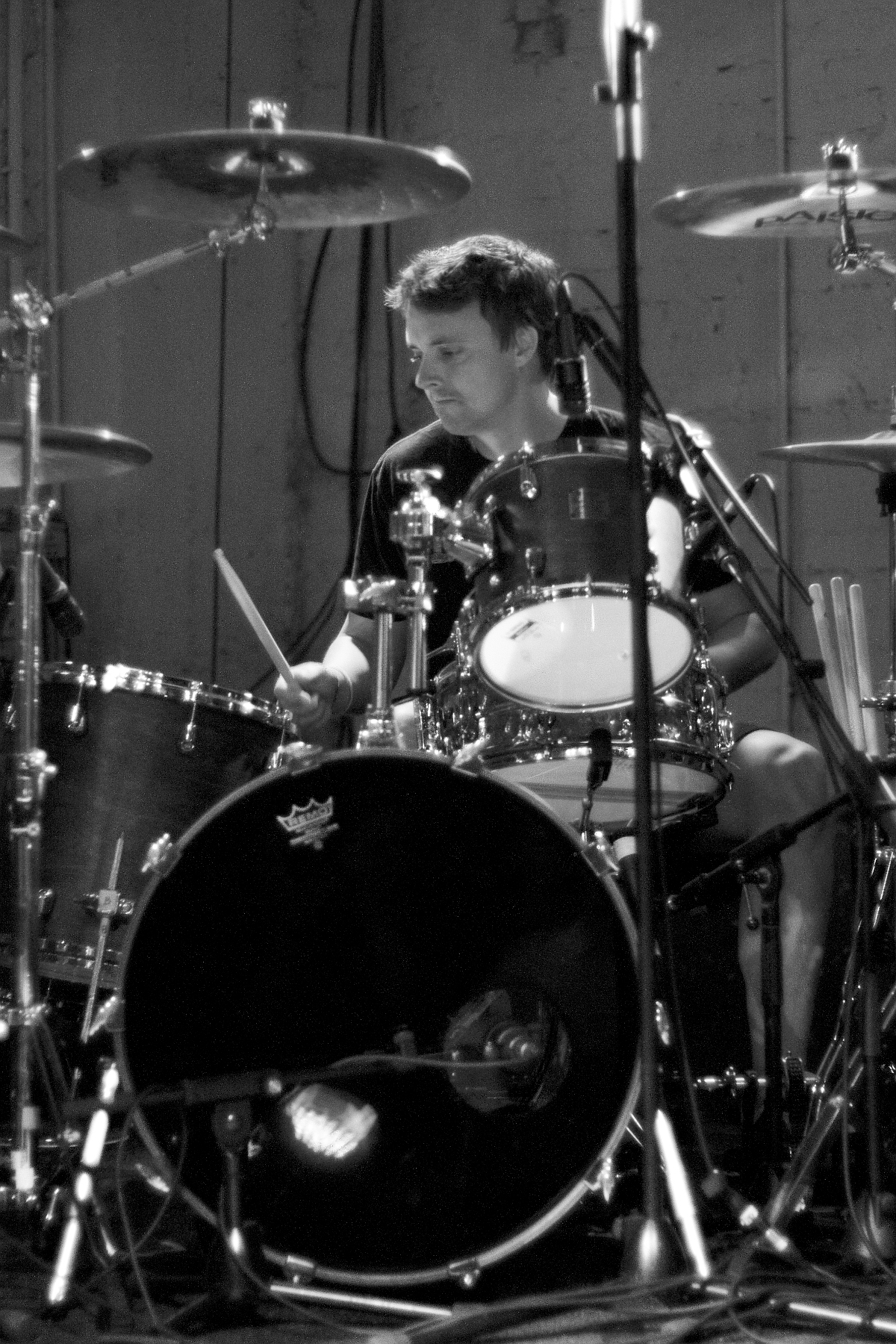
Aaron Harris of post-metal band Isis

This heavy metal movement takes influences from post-rock. While it is, in many aspects, similar to post-rock, post-metal tends to include lower-tuned guitars, distorted guitar(s), heavy atmospherics, gradual evolution of song structure, and a minimal emphasis on vocals. Post-metal stresses emotion, contrasting the ambiance of post-rock with the weight and bombast of metal. Vocals are deemphasized or non-existent, and lyrics tend to be equally abstract — often thematic or philosophical in nature. It is a largely American phenomenon, but also includes some Japanese bands. Bands like Neurosis, Isis, Cult of Luna and Pelican write lengthy songs (typically five or six per album), that can range from light and guitar-driven to heavy and drum and bass-driven.

== Power metal ==
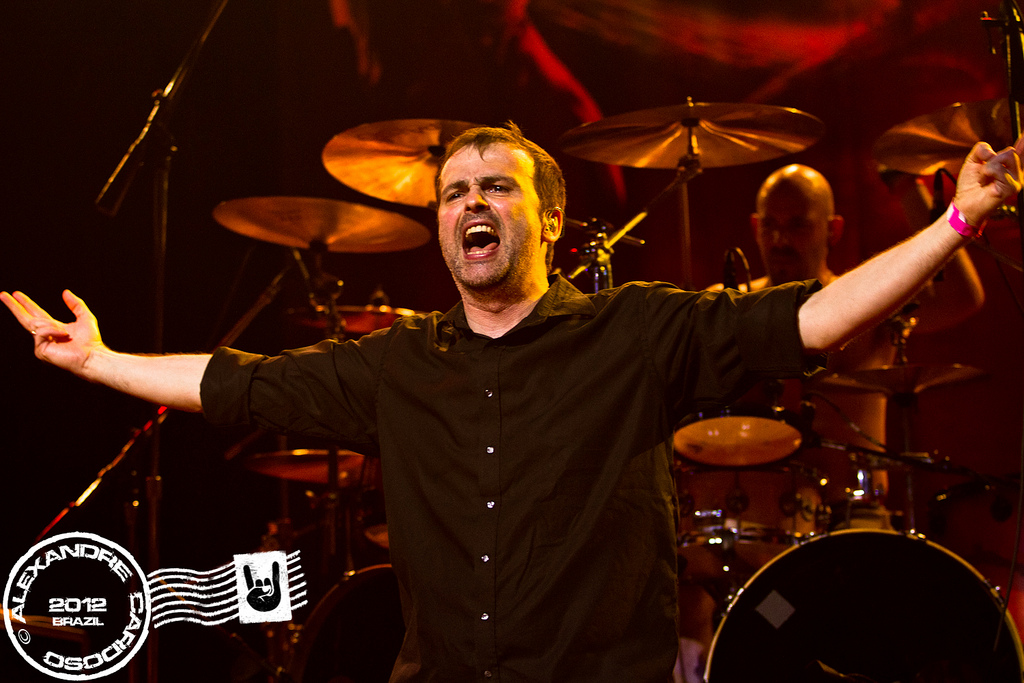
Hansi Kürsch of power metal band Blind Guardian

Power metal takes influence from heavy metal and speed metal, and often emphasizes clean, melodic, high-pitched vocals, and fast pacing that is mostly driven by double bass drumming and melodic lead guitar. The rhythm guitar is defined by straight power chord progressions. Occasionally, harsh vocals are used, but usually only as backing vocals. Power metal lyrics usually involve fantasy themes. The songs often have a theatrical, epic, and emotionally "powerful" sound. Power metal is generally more upbeat than other metal genres, seeking to empower the listener and inspire joy and courage.

The term was first used in the middle of the 1980s, and refers to two different but related styles: the first, pioneered and largely practiced in North America with a harder sound similar to speed metal, and a later, more widespread and popular style based in Europe (especially Germany, Finland, Italy and Scandinavia), Latin America (Argentina, Brazil) and Japan, with a lighter, more melodic sound and frequent use of keyboards. Examples of power metal bands include DragonForce, Blind Guardian, Helloween, Sonata Arctica, Angra, Sabaton, Stratovarius, Kamelot, Rhapsody of Fire, Powerwolf and HammerFall.

== Progressive metal ==
Progressive metal is a fusion between progressive rock and heavy metal. It is one of heavy metal's more complex genres, due to its use of unusual and dynamic time signatures, long compositions, complex compositional structures, and skilled instrumental playing, where instrumental solos are detailed and extended. However, the latest age of progressive metal has favored rougher lyrics and lower-pitched riff sequences with high amounts of strumming. Vocals, if present, are melodic (though there are a few that use unclean vocals), and lyrics are often philosophical, spiritual, or political. Many bands of the genre were influenced by the progressive rock bands Rush and King Crimson, who would often incorporate elements of heavy metal into their music. Examples of the genre include Queensrÿche, Savatage, Dream Theater, Opeth, Tool, Fates Warning, Mastodon, Gojira and Pain of Salvation.

=== Derivatives of progressive metal ===
==== Djent ====
Djent, also known as djent metal, is a musical subgenre that emerged as a spin-off from progressive metal. The word "djent" is an onomatopoeia for a heavily palm-muted, distorted guitar chord. Typically, the word is used to refer to music that makes use of this sound, to the sound itself, or to the scene that revolves around it. Djent as a style has been described as featuring heavily palm-muted, distorted guitar chords alongside virtuoso soloing, and is characterized by rhythmic complexity and palm-muted riffing. Pioneering bands in the style are Born of Osiris, Meshuggah, Periphery, Animals As Leaders, Tesseract, and Textures.

==== Progressive metalcore ====
Progressive metalcore (also called technical metalcore or ambient metalcore) is a fusion of progressive metal and metalcore characterized by highly technical lead guitar, "atmospheric" elements, and complex instrumentation. Some notable practitioners take influence from djent. Examples of progressive metalcore bands include After the Burial, Erra, Northlane, Invent Animate, and Volumes.

== Proto-metal ==
Proto-metal refers to the heavy, distorted Rock and Psychedelia music of the late 1960s and early 1970s that paved the way for Heavy metal. Before the genre was officially codified, artists experimented with heavily amplified guitars, aggressive tempos, and occult themes.

== Speed metal ==
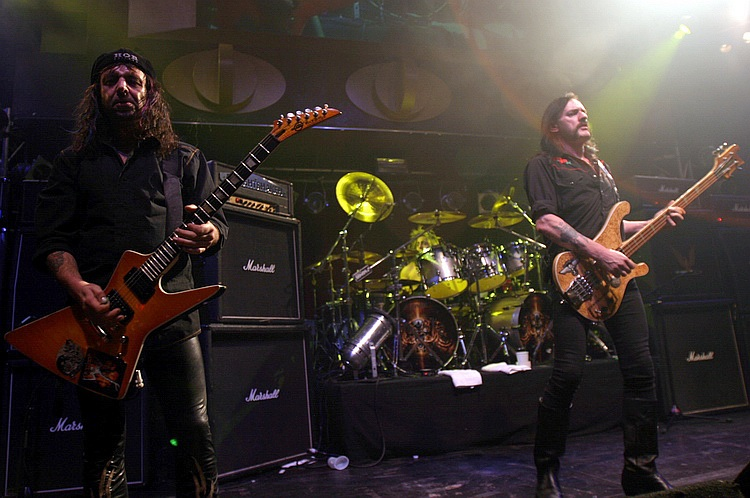
Speed metal band Motörhead

Speed metal originated in the late 1970s and early 1980s out of the new wave of British heavy metal, and was the direct musical progenitor of thrash metal. When speed metal first emerged as a genre, it increased the tempos that had been used by early heavy metal bands, while retaining their melodic approaches. Influenced by hardcore punk, speed metal is very fast, abrasive, and technically demanding. Examples of speed metal include Dorsal Atlantica, Venom, Motörhead and Anvil.

== Symphonic metal ==
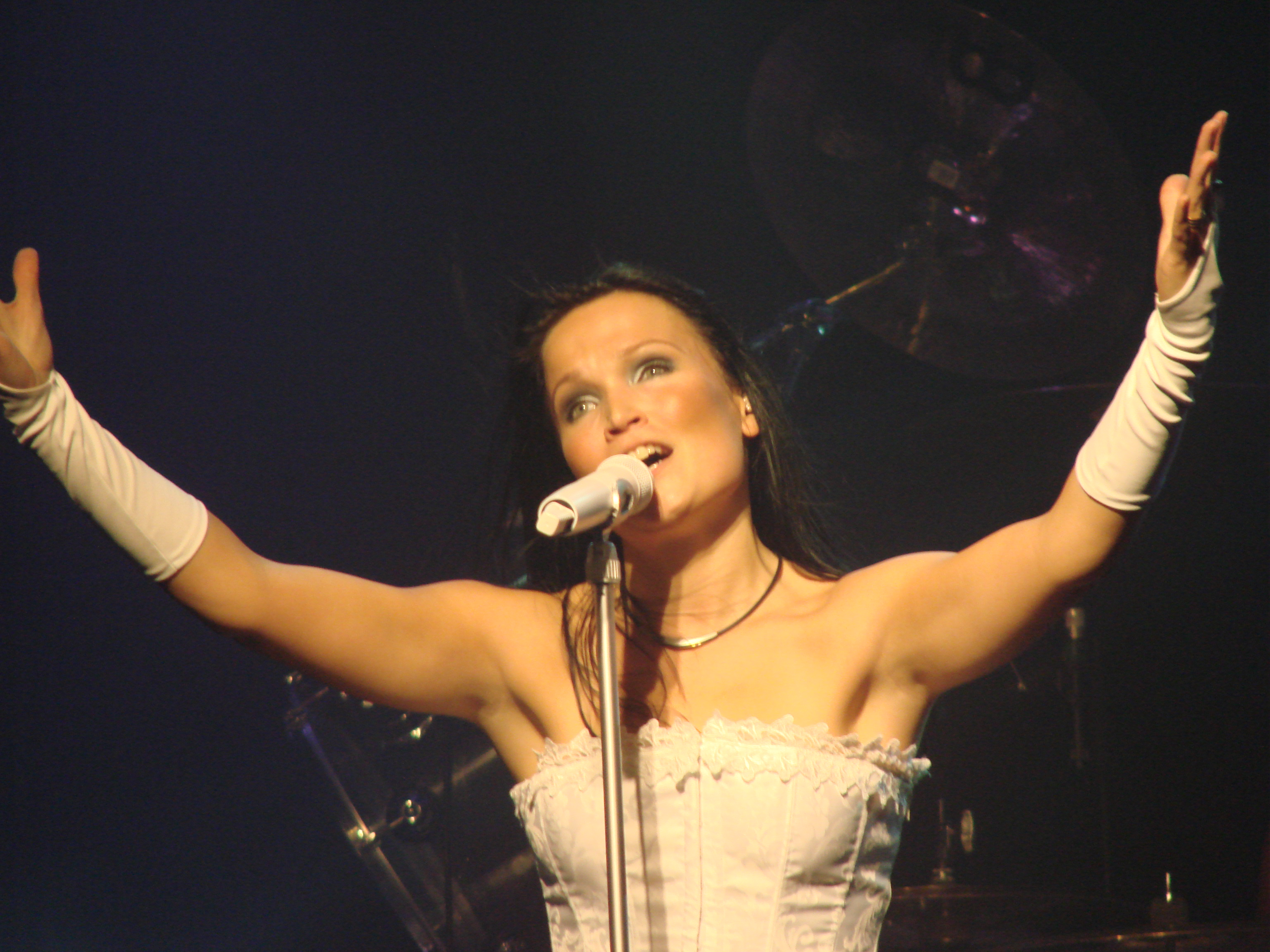
Symphonic metal band Nightwish

Symphonic metal is a cross-generic style designation for the symphonic subsets of heavy metal music subgenres. It is used to denote any metal band that makes use of symphonic or orchestral elements. Symphonic metal bands can feature classically trained vocalists, in which case they can be attributed nicknames such as opera metal or operatic metal. Examples of symphonic metal include Believer, Therion, Nightwish, Rhapsody of Fire, Epica, Within Temptation, and The Gathering.

== Thrash metal ==
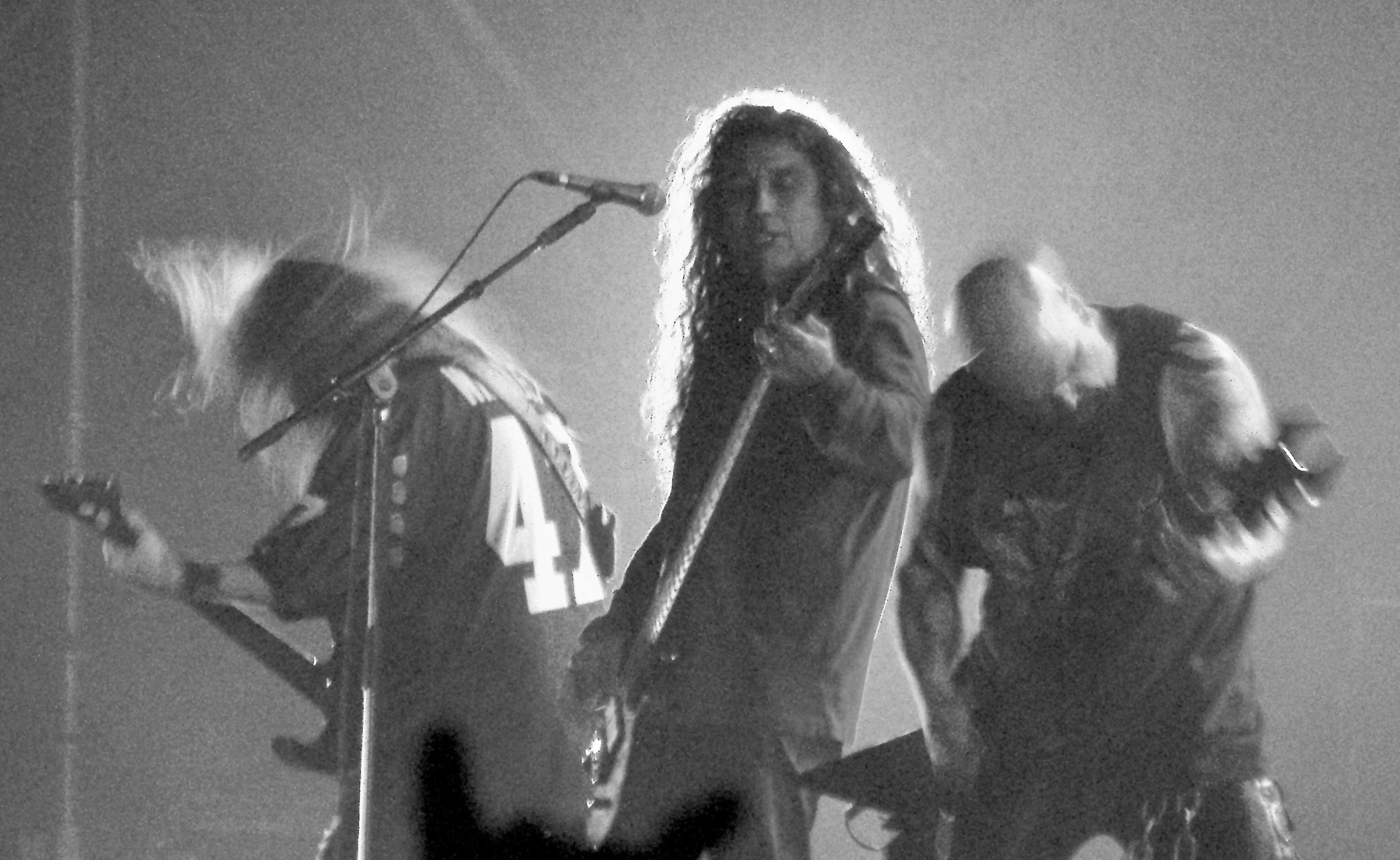
Thrash metal band Slayer

Thrash metal is often regarded as the first form of extreme metal. It is generally characterized by its fast tempos, complexity and aggression. Thrash metal guitar playing is most notable for the "chugging" sound it creates through low-pitched palm muted riffs, and high-pitched shred guitar solos. Drummers often use double-kick and double-bass drumming. Vocals are most often shouted or sung in an aggressive manner.

Thrash metal evolved from speed metal, NWOBHM and early hardcore punk at the beginning of the 1980s. Bands such as Metallica, Slayer, Megadeth and Anthrax spearheaded thrash metal, and are referred to as the genre's "Big Four", while on the European side, Sodom, Kreator, Destruction, and Tankard form the so-called "Big Teutonic Four".

=== Derivatives of thrash metal ===
==== Crossover thrash ====
Crossover thrash, often abbreviated to "crossover," and sometimes called also "punk metal," is a form of thrash metal that contains more hardcore punk elements than standard thrash. The genre lies on a continuum between heavy metal and punk rock. The genre is often confused with thrashcore, which is essentially a faster hardcore punk rather than a more punk-oriented form of metal. Corrosion of Conformity, Dirty Rotten Imbeciles, Stormtroopers of Death and Suicidal Tendencies are major bands in the genre.

==== Groove metal ====
Groove metal, also known as neo-thrash, post-thrash, or power groove, consists of slow or mid-tempo and down tuned thrash riffs, bluesy guitar solos, greatly emphasized drum work, and harsh vocals that generally consist of screaming, shouting, and raspy singing. Examples of groove metal include Pantera, Exhorder, Lamb of God, Machine Head, DevilDriver, Jinjer, Sepultura and A.N.I.M.A.L.

== Traditional heavy metal ==
Traditional heavy metal (trad metal), also known as classic metal or often simply "heavy metal", is the group of bands and artists who play a metal music style similar to the style heard before the genre evolved and splintered into many different styles and subgenres. It is characterized by mid-to-fast-tempo riffs, by thumping basslines, crunchy riffs, extended lead guitar solos, and clean, often high-pitched vocals and anthemic choruses. It is not generally categorized as a subgenre of metal, but the main genre of it. Examples include Black Sabbath, Deep Purple, Led Zeppelin, Judas Priest, Iron Maiden, Van Halen and Dio.

=== New wave of traditional heavy metal ===
More recently in the 2010s, the term "new wave of traditional heavy metal" (often abbreviated as NWOTHM) has been used to describe a new wave of bands with a newly found interest in the style, particularly the late 70s and early 80s new wave of British heavy metal variant that has influenced speed metal and power metal; some of these bands are indeed a mixture of these genres while combining more elements of the classical sound, or mimic the style at the time that would soon evolve into them.

Examples of NWOTHM bands include: Helvetets Port, Portrait, Enforcer, Cauldron, White Wizzard, Fury UK, Striker (Ca), Battle Beast, and more recently Seax, Visigoth, Blackslash (De), and Angel Sword.

== See also ==
- List of rock genres
- List of heavy metal bands
- List of heavy metal festivals
- Punk rock subgenres
- List of hardcore punk subgenres
- List of subcultures
- Microgenres
