= List of power metal bands =

This is a list of power metal bands including notable bands that have at some point in their careers played power metal or heavily contributed to the genre's development. Power metal is a subgenre of heavy metal music combining characteristics of traditional metal with speed metal, often within symphonic context. Generally, power metal is characterized by a more uplifting sound, in contrast to the heaviness and dissonance prevalent in styles such as doom metal and death metal. Power metal bands usually have anthem-like songs with fantasy-based subject matter and strong choruses, thus creating a theatrical, dramatic and emotionally "powerful" sound.

Power metal has two distinct early styles, which developed in parallel. US Power Metal was developed in the mid/late 80s, pioneered by bands such as Omen and characterized by harsh thrashy sound and a focus on speed and soaring operatic vocals. It was directly influenced by speed metal and NWOBHM, and had a drop in popularity in the 90s. A more widespread and popular style, European Power Metal, was developed in the late 80s by key bands such as Helloween, and was more melodic, employing keyboards, synths and anthem-like songs.

Proto-Power Metal (influences)
European Power Metal style
US Power Metal style

== # ==
| Name | Origin | Years active | Brief summary | Note |
|---|---|---|---|---|
| 3 Inches of Blood | Canada | 1999–2015, 2023–present | Style strongly influenced by NWOBHM, combining both operatic and growled vocals. | |

== A ==
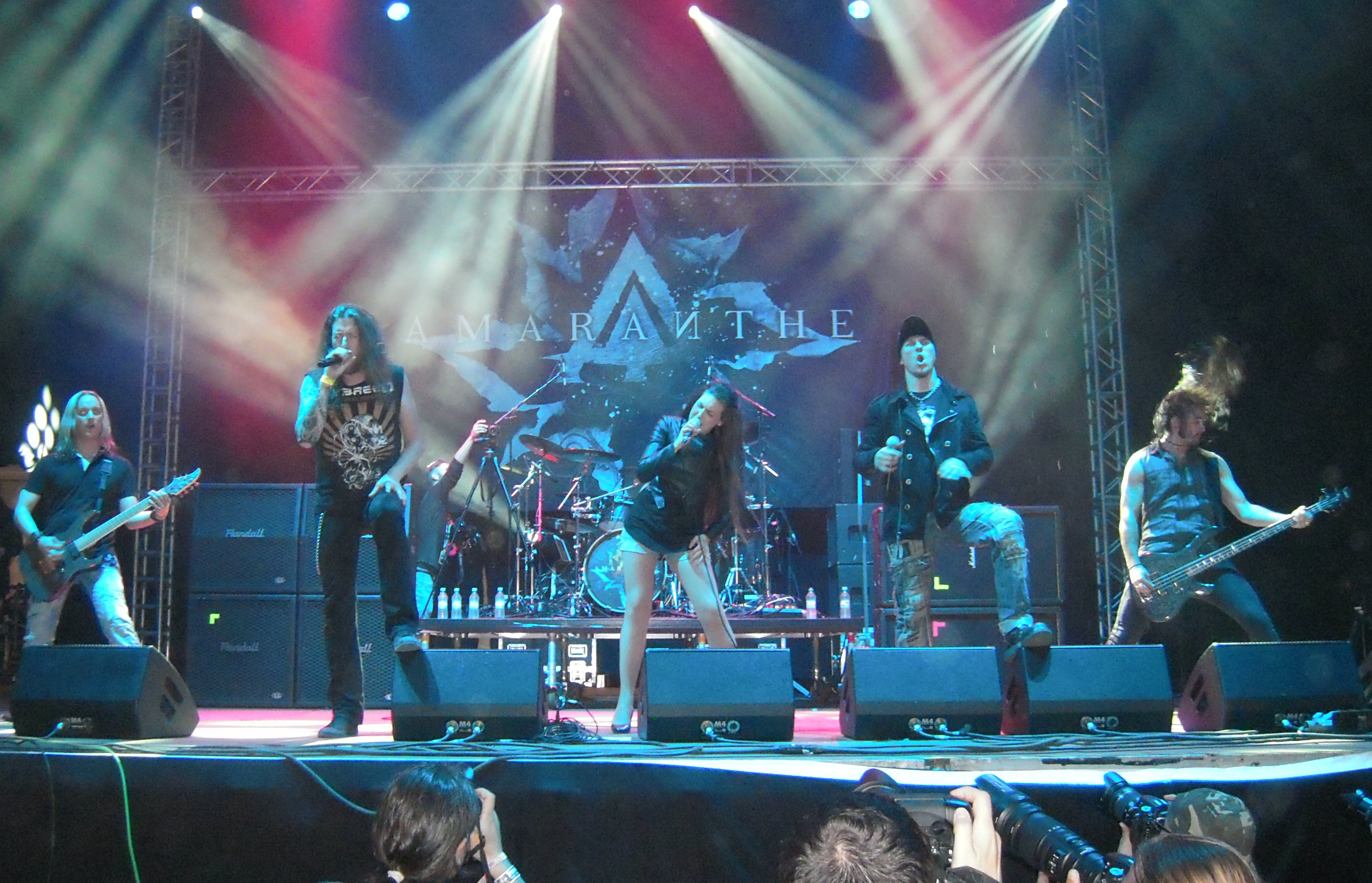
Amaranthe performing at the Wacken Open Air festival

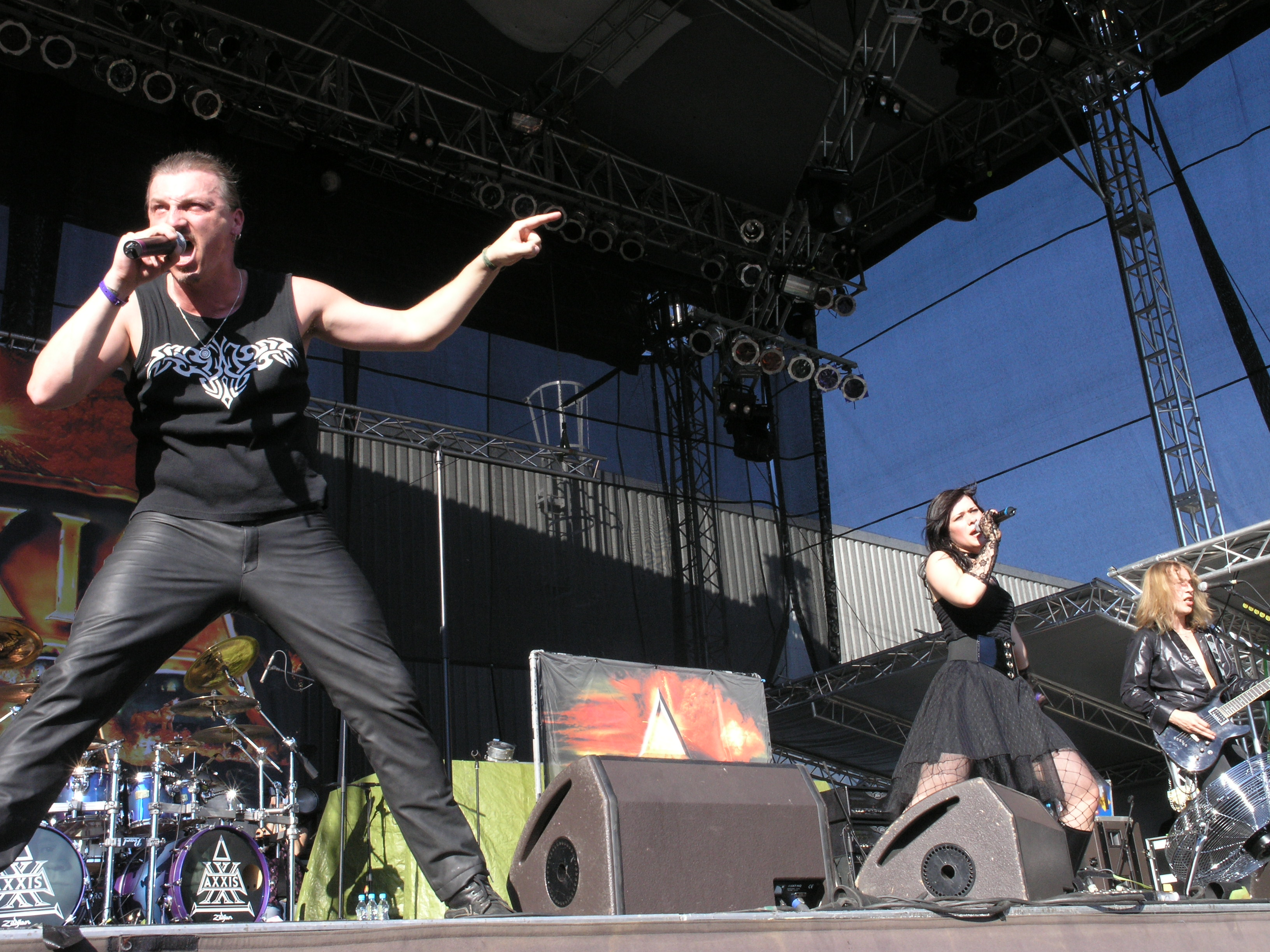
Axxis concert at the Masters of Rock 2007 festival

| Name | Origin | Years active | Brief summary | Note |
|---|---|---|---|---|
| Accept | Germany | 1976–1989, 1992–1997, 2004–2005, 2009–present | Played an important role in the development of speed and thrash metal. | |
| Adagio | France | 2000–present | Known for technical precision and dark orchestration. | |
| After Forever | Netherlands | 1995–2009 | Strong progressive metal influences, use of both soprano vocals and death grunts. | |
| Agent Steel | United States | 1984–1988, 1999–Present | Forged a reputation due to their lyrical themes of apocalyptic sci-fi. | |
| Aina | various (supergroup) | 2003–2004 | Together created the metal opera Days of Rising Doom | |
| Alestorm | Scotland | 2004–present | Exclusively pirate themed band with folk metal incorporation. | |
| Aldious | Japan | 2008–present | Japanese all-female power metal band from Osaka. Aldious have been labelled pioneers of the Girls Metal Band Boom that began in Japan in the 2010s. | |
| Almah | Brazil | 2006–present | Side project from the singer of Angra, now a full-fledged band. | |
| Altaria | Finland | 2000–2016, 2020–present | Known for recruiting guitarist Jani Liimatainen of Sonata Arctica in their earlier years. | |
| Amaran | Sweden | 2000–2005 | Gothic style with clean female vocals. | |
| Amaranthe | Sweden | 2009–present | Fuses melodic metal with pop melodies and vocals of Elize Ryd | |
| Amberian Dawn | Finland | 2006–present | Lyrics often influenced by Finnish and Norse mythology | |
| Ancient Bards | Italy | 2006–present | Their Black Crystal Sword Saga was said to be inspired by fellow Italian band Rhapsody of Fire's fantasy-styled concept albums. | |
| Angband | Iran | 2004−present | Conceived as a progressive instrumental band, the addition of a vocalist moved towards power metal. | |
| Angel Dust | Germany | 1984–1990, 1998–present | After 1998, moved away from thrash metal to a power/progressive metal style. | |
| Angra | Brazil | 1991–present | Known for symphonic interludes, technical instrumentation and Brazilian regional elements. | |
| Antiquus | Canada | 2000–present | Iron Maiden influenced band writes concept albums with unifying themes or stories. | |
| Anubis Gate | Denmark | 2003–present | Progressive band nominated for multiple Danish music awards in 2008 and 2009. | |
| Anvil | Canada | 1978–present | Their documentary illustrated how staying together as a band for them was more important than making as much money as possible. | |
| Arktida | Russia | 2003–present | One of the relatively few English-lyrics Russian power metal bands. Symphonic style. | |
| Armageddon | Sweden | 1997, 2000, 2002, 2012–present | Started as a melodic death metal band formed by Arch Enemy guitarist Christopher Amott. | |
| Armored Saint | United States | 1982–1992, 1999–present | Founders in close relation to members of Metallica, their lyrics helped shape today's power metal. | |
| Artch | Norway | 1983–Present | Early power/heavy metal band originating from Sarpsborg, Norway. | |
| Arthemis | Italy | 1994–present | Known for fusing neo-classical European style with the aggression of American Speed Metal. | |
| A Sound of Thunder | United States | 2008–present | A female-fronted band from Washington DC with varying styles. | |
| Astral Doors | Sweden | 2002–present | "Jerusalem", the sixth album by Astral Doors is a clear singing from vocalist Nils Patrik Johansson. | |
| At Vance | Germany | 1998–present | Their first album included covers of a Vivaldi piece Summer and ABBA's Money, Money, Money | |
| Attacker | United States | 1983–1989, 2001–present | | |
| Avalanch | Spain | 1997–present | A leading Spanish-language power metal (particularly their first three albums) band, the ejection of some of its members led to the creation of WarCry in 2001. | |
| Avantasia | Germany | 1999–present | A metal opera hosted by Tobias Sammet, different renowned musicians/vocalists participate in every album. | |
| Avian | United States | 2002–present | Formed after being inspired by a metal festival that featured performances by Gamma Ray, Blind Guardian, Edguy, and others. | |
| Axel Rudi Pell | Germany | 1989–present | Eponymous German heavy metal / hard rock band formed in 1989 by guitarist Axel Rudi Pell after leaving Steeler; known for a classic, melodic, guitar-driven sound influenced by Deep Purple, Rainbow, and Dio. | |
| Axenstar | Sweden | 1998–present | Originally formed as a cover band, now producing power metal that shies away from typical mythical themes. | |
| Axxis | Germany | 1988–present | Their debut album, "Kingdom of the Night", became the best-selling debut album ever by a hard rock band in Germany in 1989. | |
| Ayreon | Netherlands | 1995–2008, 2012–present | A rock-opera type solo project. | |

== B ==
| Name | Origin | Years active | Brief summary | Note |
|---|---|---|---|---|
| Balance of Power | United Kingdom | 1995–present | Christian power/progressive metal band from London. | |
| Banshee | United States | 1985–1993, 1999–2000, 2008-present | A mix between NWOBHM sound combined with US Power Metal style. | |
| Battle Beast | Finland | 2008–present | Known for winning two major band competitions prior to procuring a record contract. | |
| Battlelore | Finland | 1999–present | Folk mixed with power and melodic death metal, growled vocals with clean female accompaniment and lyrics inspired by Tolkien's TLOTR. | |
| Beast in Black | Finland | 2015–present | A five-piece Helsinki-based band founded by Anton Kabanen after parting ways with the band Battle Beast. | |
| Benedictum | United States | 2005–present | Female fronted harder style power metal from band members who were previously a Dio tribute band. | |
| Beto Vázquez Infinity | Argentina | 2000–present | Symphonic/gothic style band hailing from Buenos Aires, Argentina. | |
| Beyond Fear | United States | 2005–present | A side project band of Tim "Ripper" Owens. | |
| Black Death | United States | 1977-1984 | Marketed their band as the first all-African-American heavy metal band. | |
| Blackguard | Canada | 2001–present | Melodic death metal with power/folk metal influences. | |
| Black Majesty | Australia | 2001–present | Formed by ex-members of prominent bands on the Australian metal scene | |
| Blind Guardian | Germany | 1984–present | Often credited as one of the seminal and most influential bands in the power metal and speed metal subgenres. | |
| Bloodbound | Sweden | 2004–present | Melodic power metal band that uses corpse paint in promotional photos, in a style similar to black metal acts. | |
| Borealis | Canada | 2005–present | Heavy and progressive with deep vocals, known for their excellent live performances. | |
| Brainstorm | Germany | 1989–present | Known to play a somewhat darker style of music than most power metal groups. | |
| Brothers of Metal | Sweden | 2012–present | Norse Mythology inspired heavy metal band from Falun, Sweden. | |
| Brocas Helm | United States | 1982–2013 | Known for founding their own record label after disappointment with their affiliated labels. | |
| Burning Point | Finland | 1997–present | Originally doom-influenced, the band moved towards a power metal feel. | |

== C ==
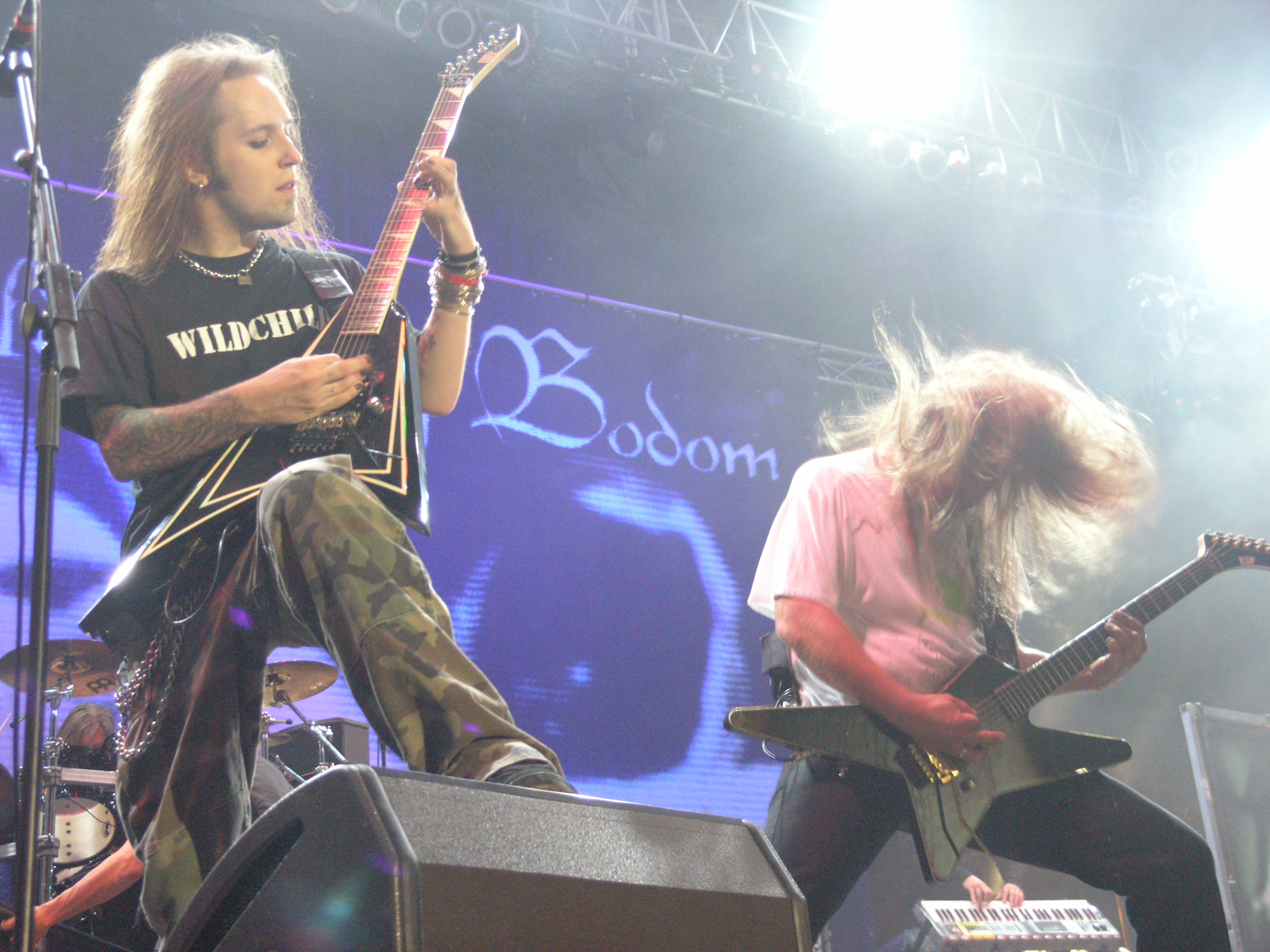
Children of Bodom at 2007's Masters of Rock

| Name | Origin | Years active | Brief summary | Note |
|---|---|---|---|---|
| Cadacross | Finland | 1997–2005 | Their second album departed towards heavier viking metal. | |
| Cain's Offering | Finland | 2009–present | Formed by ex-Sonata Arctica members Jani Liimatainen, Mikko Härkin and Stratovarius vocalist Timo Kotipelto. | |
| Catharsis | Russia | 1996–present | Early demos the band played a style with a mix of death metal and doom metal. | |
| Celesty | Finland | 1998–2012, 2015–2016 | Epic, fantasy-themed power metal. | < |
| Cellador | United States | 2004–present | Contrasts the popular death metal and metalcore scenes of the American Midwest with melodic speed metal. | |
| Chastain | United States | 1984–present | Known for David Chastain's shred guitar work. | |
| Children of Bodom | Finland | 1993–2019 | One of Finland's best selling artists of all time, incorporating power metal and melodic death metal. | |
| Chinchilla | Germany | 1988–present | A band with a reputation of being serious heavy performers, despite their ironic band name. | |
| Circle II Circle | United States | 2001–present | Formed by former Savatage lead vocalist, Zachary Stevens. | |
| Cirith Ungol | United States | 1972–1992 | Sword and sorcery themed songs contributed to the development of power metal as a genre. | |
| Cloven Hoof | United Kingdom | 1979–1990, 2000–present | A NWOBHM band that helped carve a path for Power Metal. After a long departure in 1990, the band reformed in 2000. | |
| Conception | Norway | 1989–1998, 2005, 2018–present | Features ex-Kamelot vocalist Roy Khan. | |
| Concerto Moon | Japan | 1996–present | 80s style Japanese symphonic rock specialists. | |
| Control Denied | United States | 1995–1997, 1999–2001 | A power/progressive metal band formed by Death co-founder Chuck Schuldiner. Discontinued after Schuldiner's death in 2001. | |
| Crimson Glory | United States | 1979–1992, 1998–present | A pioneer of the American progressive metal movement. | |
| Crystal Eyes | Sweden | 1992–present | Put their own studio together in order to improve the quality of their recordings after dissatisfaction with their first label. | |
| Crystal Viper | Poland | 2003–present | Polish band founded by singer/songwriter and recently guitarist Marta Gabriel | |

== D ==
| Name | Origin | Years active | Brief summary | Note |
|---|---|---|---|---|
| Damien Thorne | United States | 1983—present | One of the leading bands during the American power metal movement in the 80s. | |
| Dark Empire | United States | 2004–2013 | Progressive, power, and thrash mix band originating from New Jersey. | |
| Dark Moor | Spain | 1993−present | Neo-classical and symphonic elements. One of the most prominent Spanish power metal acts. | |
| Demons and Wizards | Germany | 1998–2021 | Formed by the vocalist for Blind Guardian, Hansi Kürsch, and the guitarist of Iced Earth, Jon Schaffer. | |
| Destroy Destroy Destroy | United States | 2003–Present | Also demonstrates styles of Melodic Death Metal and Symphonic Black Metal. | |
| DGM | Italy | 1994–present | Started as a power metal oriented instrumental band, gradually moved towards a progressive feel. | |
| Dio | United States | 1982–1991, 1993-2010 | The lyrics of renowned vocalist Ronnie James Dio greatly influenced development of power metal and heavy metal as a whole. | |
| Dionysus | Sweden | 1999–2008 | Formed by the drummer of Sinergy. | |
| Divinefire | Finland | 2004–present | Their style mixes power metal with both melodic and aggressive elements. | |
| Domine | Italy | 1984–present | Linked to heroic fantasy and sword and sorcery themes. | |
| Dominum | Germany | 2022–present | A zombie-themed band formed by singer Dr. Dead (Felix Heldt). | |
| Doomsword | Italy | 1997–present | Influences from themes such as ancient and medieval history, fantasy literature and European mythology. | |
| Dragoncorpse | Canada, United States, Australia | 2021–present | Known for their unique blend of power metal and deathcore. | |
| DragonForce | United Kingdom | 1999–present | Known for its long and fast guitar solos, fantasy-based lyrics, and electronic sounds in their music to add to their retro video game-influenced sound. | |
| Dragonland | Sweden | 1999–present | Known for their self-produced The Dragonland Chronicles fantasy saga, which spans their first, second, and fifth albums, and the original symphonic/electronic elements crafted by Elias Holmlid. | |
| Dreamaker | Spain | 2003-2011 | Composed of former Dark Moor members. | |
| Dream Evil | Sweden | 1999–present | Known for their respect to classic heavy metal and their 1980s style sound. | |
| Dreamtale | Finland | 1999–present | Speedy and light style, with occasional accompaniments of symphonic instruments. | |
| Dreamtone & Iris Mavraki's Neverland | Greece, Turkey | 2005–present | Symphonic power metal collaboration between the Turkish band Dreamtone and Greek singer Iris Mavraki. | |
| Dungeon | Australia | 1989–2005 | Australian heavy/power metal band formed in the mining town of Broken Hill, Australia. | |
| Dynazty | Sweden | 2007–present | Swedish power metal band from Stockholm, Sweden. The lead vocalist, Nils Molin, is also a vocal contributor to Amaranthe. | |

== E ==
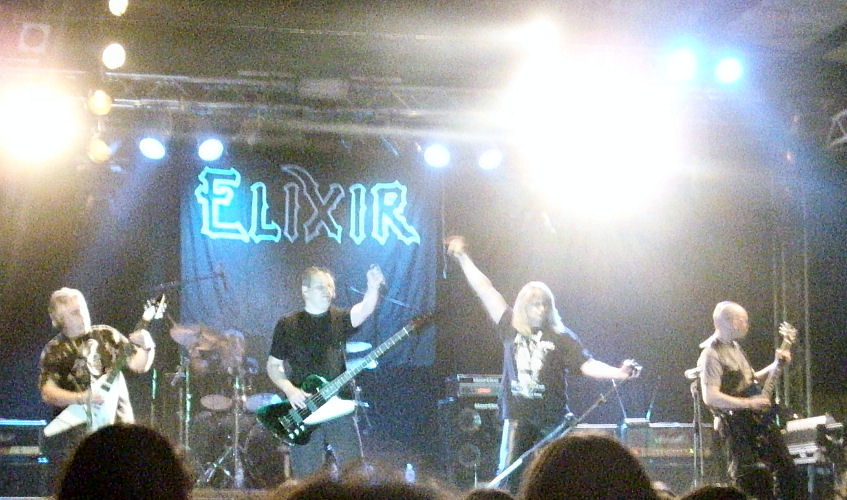
Elixir performing in 2010

| Name | Origin | Years active | Brief summary | Note |
|---|---|---|---|---|
| Edenbridge | Austria | 1998–present | Symphonic power metal band with a female singer and considerable orchestration. | |
| Edguy | Germany | 1992–present | One of the most famous modern power metal bands, highly metaphorical lyrics and a style true to the power metal denomination. | |
| Eidolon | Canada | 1993–2007 | On the heavier side of power metal, after the founding members became a part of Megadeth they stopped recording new albums. | |
| Eldritch | Italy | 1991–present | Prominent band within Italian progressive metal in the late 1990s. | |
| Elegy | Netherlands | 1986–present | Pioneers of progressive/power metal mixture. | |
| Elixir | England | 1983–2012 | Notable for being associated with the New Wave of British Heavy Metal movement. | |
| Elvenking | Italy | 1997–present | Speed metal with rustic folk influence. | |
| Empyria | Canada | 1991–present | Technical progressive power metal, their unique sound was one of the reasons they were reasonably received in the mid-1990s. | |
| Epica | Netherlands | 2002–present | Known for their symphonic sound and the use of female vocals and male growls. Their lyrical themes include society, politics, science, and religion. | |
| Epidemia | Russia | 1995–present | Best known for its series of metal operas, Elven Manuscript. | |
| Esprit D'Air | United Kingdom | 2010–2013, 2016–present | Japanese lyrics and artwork are centered around ethereal and otherworldly themes and inspired by X Japan. In 2018 their album Constellations won the Independent Music Awards (IMAs) for Best Metal Album judged by Slayer, Sepultura and Amy Lee. | |
| Excalion | Finland | 2000–present | Lyrical themes originate in different moods and hardships, experiences of life. | |

== F ==
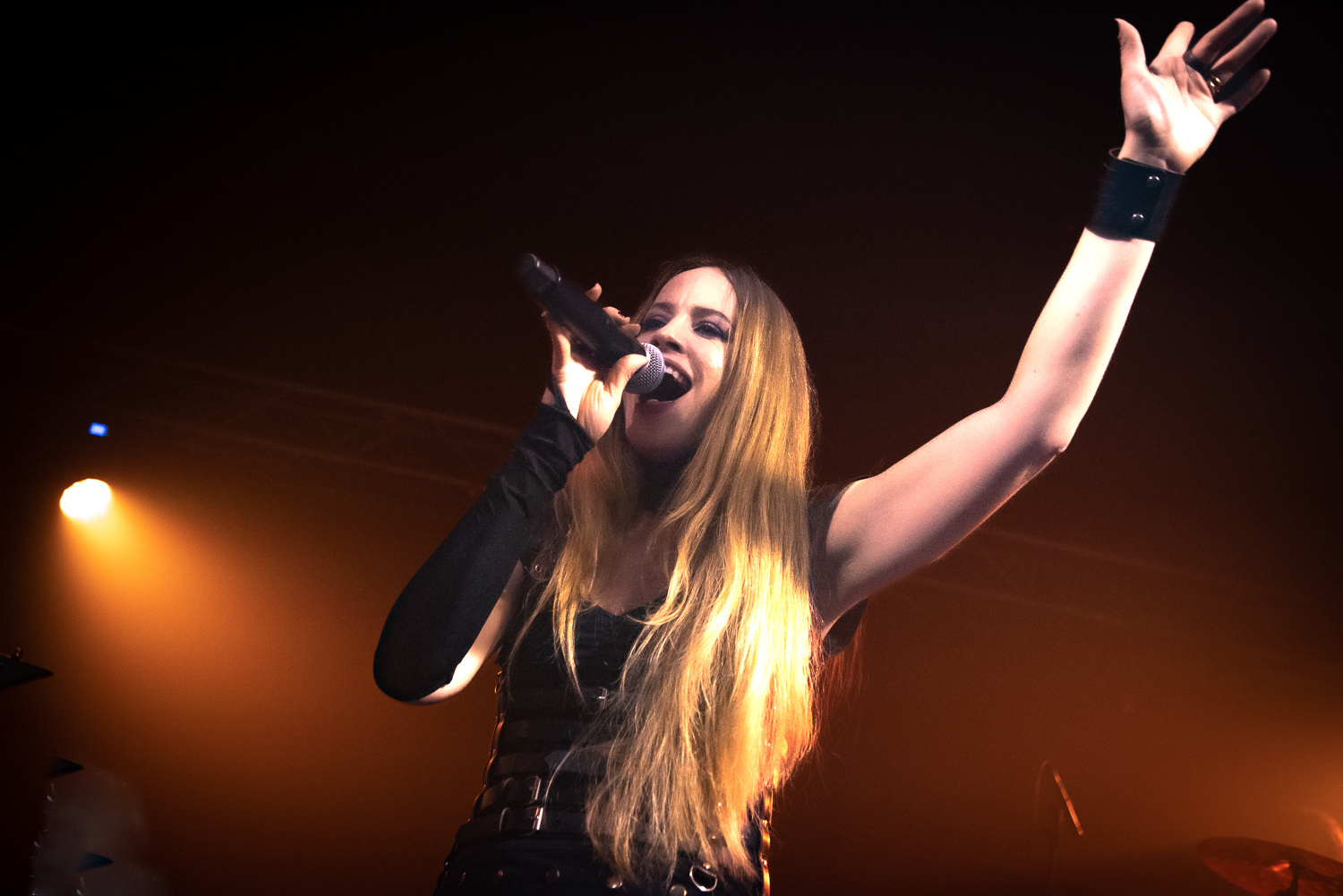
Giada Etro from Frozen Crown.

| Name | Origin | Years active | Brief summary | Note |
|---|---|---|---|---|
| Fairyland | France | 1998–present | Formed by keyboardist Philippe Giordana with melodic and symphonic elements. | |
| Falconer | Sweden | 1999–2020 | Utilizes folk instrumentation and melody to create a medieval sound and atmosphere. | |
| Fifth Angel | United States | 1983–1990, 2009–present | Band which brought guitarist James Byrd to prominence. | |
| Firewind | Greece | 1998, 2002–present | Founded by guitarist Gus G, now also the guitarist for Ozzy Osbourne. | |
| Forgotten Tales | Canada | 1999–present | Fronted by powerful female vocalist Sonia Pineault. Neoclassical guitars with folk keys and effects. | |
| Freedom Call | Germany | 1998–present | Known for their upbeat, feel-good sound free from melancholy undertones or darker styles of some power metal groups. | |
| Frozen Crown | Italy | 2017–present | Led by Federico Mondelli and Giada Etro | |

== G ==
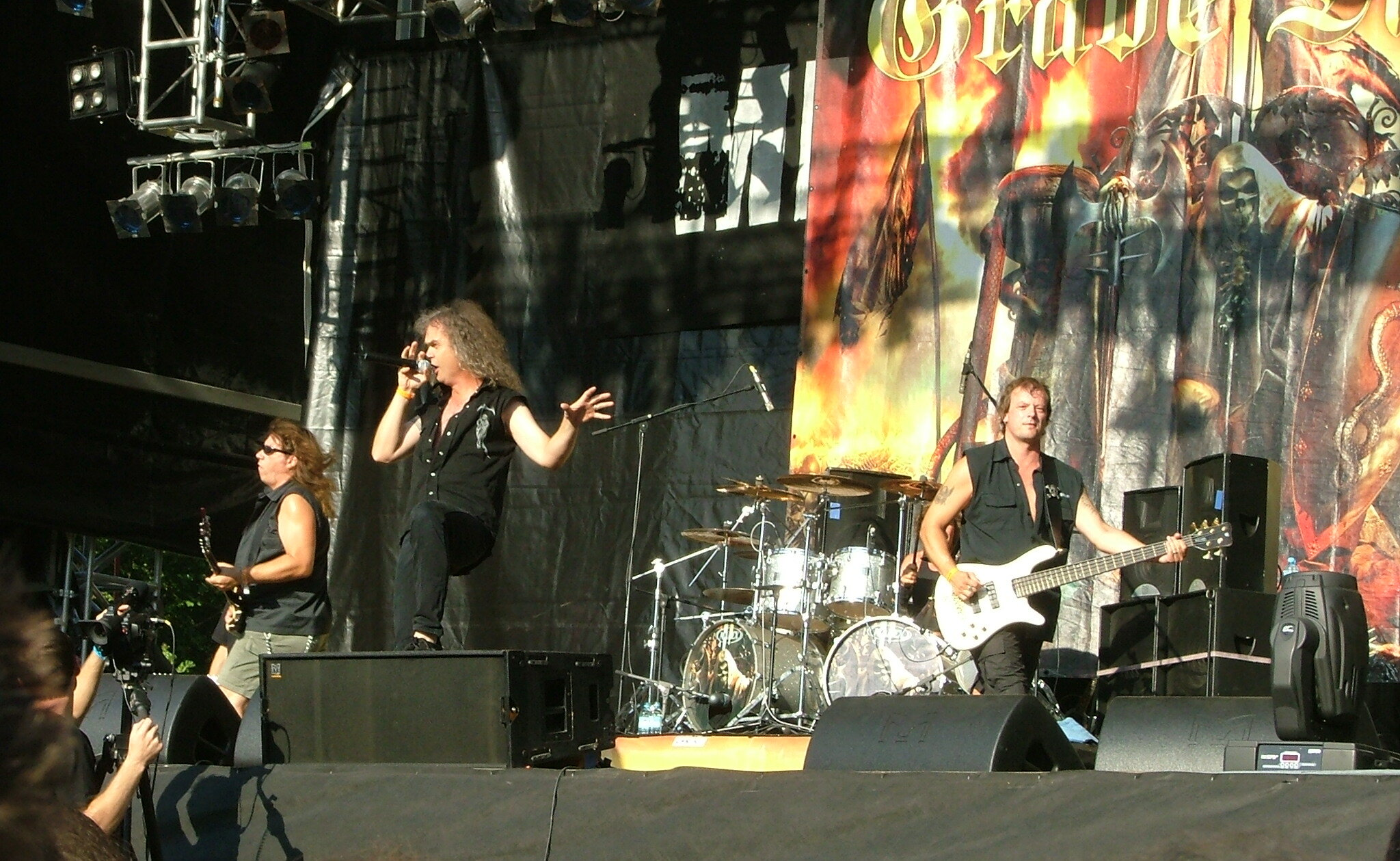
Grave Digger at Metalcamp in 2007

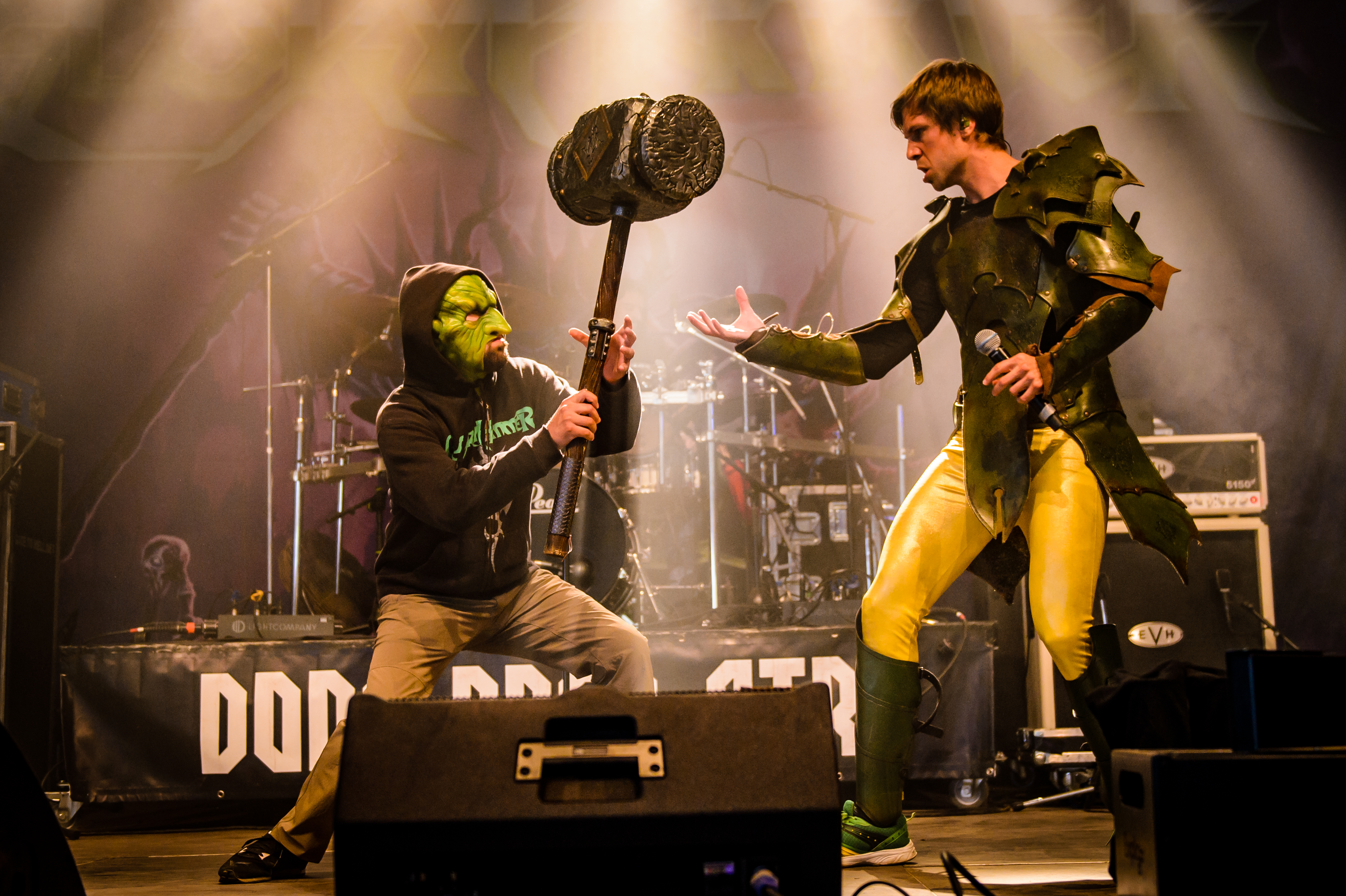
Gloryhammer at Dong Open Air, 2017. Wearing their armor on stage.

| Name | Origin | Years active | Brief summary | Note |
|---|---|---|---|---|
| Galneryus | Japan | 2001–present | Neo-classical power metal with many speed metal style songs. | |
| Gamma Ray | Germany | 1989–present | Known as one of the most prominent bands of the German heavy metal scene. | |
| Gloryhammer | United Kingdom, Cyprus | 2010–present | Presents themselves as a tongue-in-cheek, parody of stereotypical power metal groups as well as appearing on-stage in armour and costumes. | |
| Grave Digger | Germany | 1980–1987, 1991–present | One of the earlier heavy metal bands that contributed to the development of power metal as a genre. | |
| Gwyllion | Belgium | 2003–2009 | Released two albums before splitting up, symphonic power metal group. | |

== H ==
| Name | Origin | Years active | Brief summary | Note |
|---|---|---|---|---|
| HammerFall | Sweden | 1993–present | Cited as producing some of the highest acclaimed power metal albums, HammerFall is a famous example of power metal as a whole. | |
| Hawaii | United States | 1981–1985 | One of the first heavy metal bands that formed within Honolulu, Hawaii. | |
| Heavenly | France | 1994–present | They were signed by record label Noise Records after winning a competition sponsored by the label's website. | |
| Heavens Gate | Germany | 1982–1999 | One of the earliest German power metal bands. | |
| Heavy Load | Sweden | 1976–1985 | The band is often hailed as the first Swedish heavy metal band, and were known for their Viking themes. | |
| Heir Apparent | United States | 1983–1989, 2000–present | Technical style band from Seattle. | |
| Helloween | Germany | 1984–present | Famous pioneers of power metal sound, their second and third studio albums, Keeper of the Seven Keys: Part I and Part II are considered masterpieces of the genre. | |
| Helstar | United States | 1982–present | A key band in the development of the American power metal scene emerging in the mid-1980s. | |
| Hibria | Brazil | 1996–present | Speed metal and technically influenced Brazilian band. | |
| Highland Glory | Norway | 2001–present | Their first album, From the Cradle to the Brave, was released in 2003. | |
| Hittman | United States | 1984–1994, 2017–present | | |
| Hollow | Sweden | 1995–present | Highly technical progressive style. | |
| Holy Dragons | Kazakhstan | 1992–present | Claimed to be Kazakhstan's first heavy metal band. | |
| Holy Knights | Italy | 1998–2002, 2010–present | Symphonic accompaniment, choruses with many backing vocalists creating an epic ballad feel. | |
| Human Fortress | Germany | 1997–present | Strives for an epic feel with their music, calling their music "epic battle metal". | |

== I ==
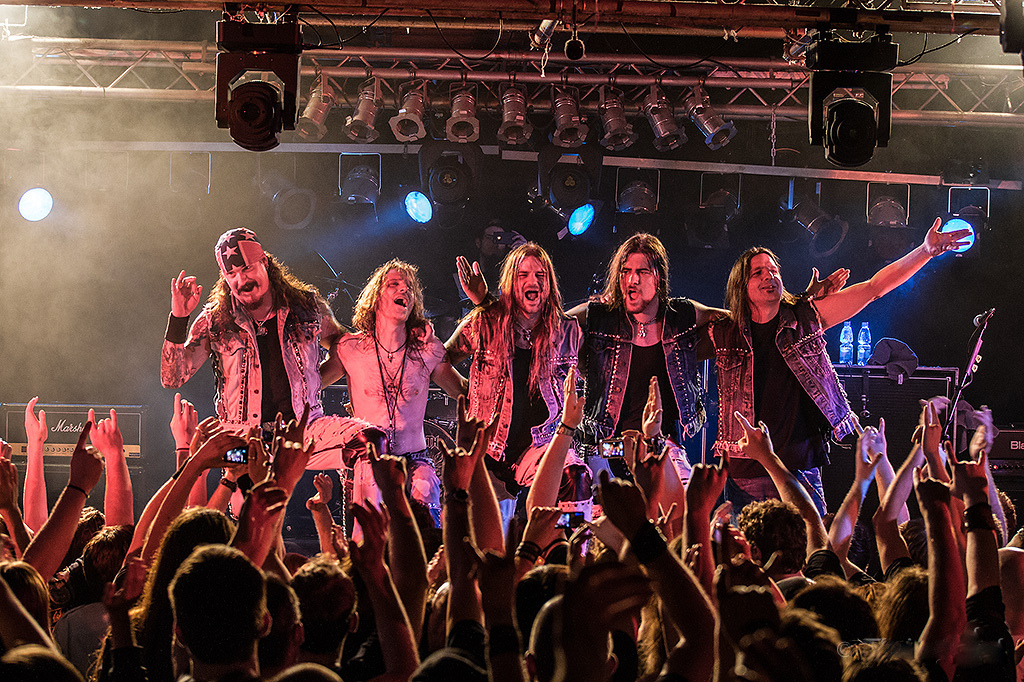
Iced Earth in December 2012

| Name | Origin | Years active | Brief summary | Note |
|---|---|---|---|---|
| Iced Earth | United States | 1985–present | Successful band that has played many different styles of metal with members changing constantly other than the founding guitarist Jon Schaffer. | |
| Ilium | Australia | 1998–present | In 2012 they recorded a music video dedicated to Greenpeace. | |
| Imperial Age | Russia | 2012−present | Imperial Age have three singers (one male and two female) and blend power metal with symphonic metal. They are the most successful band in the genre from Russia. | |
| Impulse | Bulgaria | 1979–1991, 1995–1998, 2012-present | One of the first Bulgarian heavy metal bands. | |
| Into Eternity | Canada | 1997−present | Progressive/melodic death with a bit of power metal influence, from Regina, Saskatchewan. | |
| Ion Vein | United States | 1995–present | Progressive/Power metal band from Chicago. | |
| Iron Fire | Denmark | 1995–present | Early speed metal style incorporated with recent power metal sounds. | |
| Iron Maiden | England | 1975–present | Not considered Power Metal, but often listed as a major influence. | |
| Iron Mask | Belgium | 2002–present | Contains ex-Yngwie Malmsteen members. | |
| Iron Savior | Germany | 1996–present | Blends power metal with a high-concept science fiction story, immediately embarking on a multiple-album tale of a fictional space vessel of the same name. Founded by Piet Sielck and Kai Hansen. | |

== J ==
| Name | Origin | Years active | Brief summary | Note |
|---|---|---|---|---|
| Jacobs Dream | United States | 1997–present | Ohio originating technical power metal, known previously as Iron Angel. | |
| Jag Panzer | United States | 1981–1988, 1994–2011, 2013-present | NWOBHM influenced band that influenced the development of thrash and power metal. | |
| Judas Priest | United Kingdom | 1969–present | One of the most famous heavy metal bands of all time, as well as the origin of many sounds that influenced the many subgenres of heavy metal today. | |
| Judicator | United States | 2012–present | The band mainly focuses on history and Existentialism. | |

== K ==
| Name | Origin | Years active | Brief summary | Note |
|---|---|---|---|---|
| Kalmah | Finland | 1998–present | Their melodic death/power metal style sound is often compared to prominent Finnish band Children of Bodom. | |
| Kamelot | United States | 1991–present | One of the more successful bands in the North American power metal scene. Symphonic, neo-classical, and progressive elements. | |
| Katagory V | United States | 1999–Present | American power metal band with thrash and progressive elements. | |
| Keldian | Norway | 2005—present | This band's digital release Outbound was voted the best power metal album of 2013 on Reddit. Space exploration themes. | |
| Kerion | France | 2003–present | Features a choir directed by Phil Gordana of Fairyland. Mainly labelled as a symphonic metal band. | |
| Kiuas | Finland | 2000–2013, 2021–present | The name of the band is derived from the word 'hiidenkiuas', which means 'barrow consisting of a pile of rocks'. | |
| Kotipelto | Finland | 2001–present | Formed by Stratovarius member Timo Kotipelto while the aforementioned band was on hiatus. | |

== L ==
| Name | Origin | Years active | Brief summary | Note |
|---|---|---|---|---|
| Lääz Rockit | United States | 1982–1992, 2005–present | One of their signature elements were Ibanez guitars adorned with elaborate airbrushed scenes of warfare. | |
| Labyrinth | Italy | 1991–present | Progressive power metal from Italy. | |
| Last Tribe | Sweden | 2000–2003 | Melodic power metal from Sweden. | |
| Leah | Canada | 2011–present | Solo artist from Canada, known for fusing metal, including power metal, with Celtic and world music | |
| Leatherwolf | United States | 1981–present | Their three-guitarist setup for their band set them apart from other bands of similar style in early years. | |
| Lethal | United States | 1982–1996, 2006–present | Early American progressive band with a style similar to Fates Warning. | |
| Liege Lord | United States | 1982–1989, 2000, 2012–present | Originated as a Judas Priest cover band, aided development of the power metal genre. | |
| Lizzy Borden | United States | 1983–2004, 2006–present | Both the band and the lead vocalist are named after Lizzie Borden, a woman accused and acquitted of murder in the late 19th century. Glam metal influence. | |
| Lord | Australia | 2003–present | Formed as a solo project for former Dungeon frontman Lord Tim. | |
| Lords of the Trident | United States | 2008–present | Known for its mixture of classic and modern heavy metal, expansive fantasy backstory, and energetic live shows. | |
| Lost Horizon | Sweden | 1990–1994, 1999–present | Known for taking the epic feel of power metal to new levels, having been described as "Metallica will make you feel angry, but Lost Horizon will make you feel like a god." | |
| Lovebites | Japan | 2016–present | All-female power metal band formed by former members of Destrose. In 2018 they won the Metal Hammer Golden Gods Award for Best New Band. | |
| Luca Turilli's Dreamquest | Italy | 2005-2011 | A past side project of Luca Turilli (known for his work in Rhapsody of Fire and Luca Turilli's Rhapsody). | |
| Luca Turilli's Rhapsody | Italy | 2011–2018 | After a friendly split with band members of Rhapsody of Fire, guitarist/keyboardist Luca Turilli continued with this project. | |
| Luna Mortis | United States | 2001-2010, 2013–present | Combination of melodic death, power, thrash, and progressive, band with a female vocalist who sings/growls. | |
| Lux Perpetua | Poland | 2009–present | Power metal band from Poland. Their name is inspired by Andrzej Sapkowski's book and means "eternal light". | |

== M ==
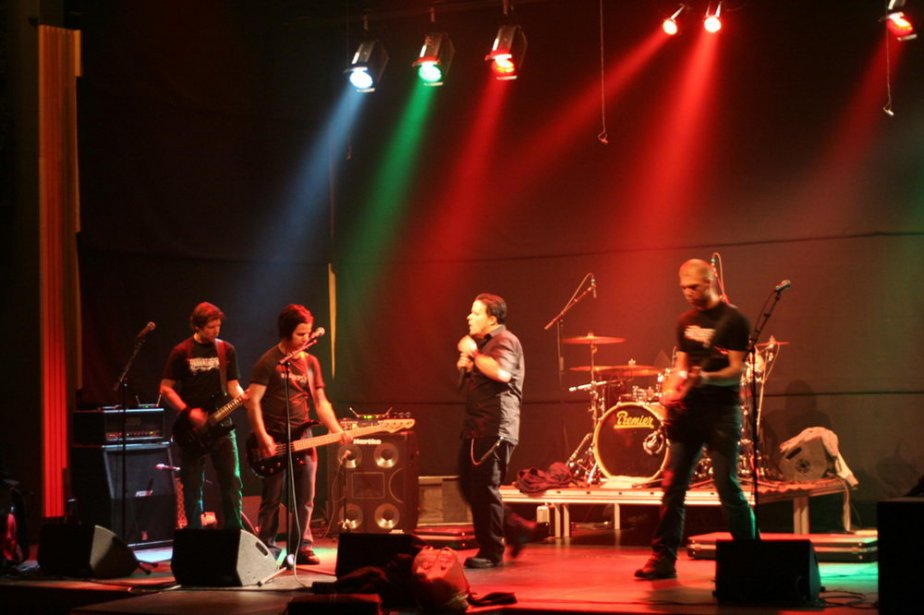
Machinae Supremacy performing

| Name | Origin | Years active | Brief summary | Note |
|---|---|---|---|---|
| Machinae Supremacy | Sweden | 2000–present | Combines modern heavy metal/power metal and alternative rock with chiptunes. | |
| Magica | Romania | 2002–present | A Romanian power metal band with mythical themes and gothic metal influences. | |
| Majestic | Sweden | 1997–2001 | Recorded two albums in 1999 and 2000 with largely varied band members between albums, split up in 2001. | |
| Majestica | Sweden | 2000-2019 (as ReinXeed), 2019-present | Symphonic power metal featuring Tommy Johansson of Sabaton on vocals. | |
| Majesty | Germany | 2000–present | Heavily influenced by Manowar both musically and lyrically. | |
| Manigance | France | 1995–present | A French-language band. | |
| Manilla Road | United States | 1977–1990, 2001–present | Early albums have more in common with progressive rock and proto-heavy metal than the band's later heavier speed/thrash metal sound. | |
| Manticora | Denmark | 1996–present | Progressive power metal with speed metal influences. | |
| Manowar | United States | 1980–present | Known for its lyrics based on fantasy (particularly sword and sorcery), and mythological topics (particularly Norse mythology). | |
| Mary's Blood | Japan | 2009–present | a Japanese all-female power metal band from Tokyo, formed in 2009 by four former members of Destrose. | |
| Mastercastle | Italy | 2008–present | | |
| Masterplan | Germany | 2001–present | Founded by ex-Helloween members. | |
| Meliah Rage | United States | 1987–present | Characterized primarily by their thrash metal vibe married to more classical metal melodies. | |
| Mercenary | Denmark | 1991–present | Usually labelled as a melodic death metal band, they use aspects of power metal in their music, as well as thrash metal in their earlier work. | |
| Metal Church | United States | 1980–1994, 1998–2009, 2012–present | Lyrical topics such as conflict and paranoia later expanded into philosophical and social commentary. | |
| Metalium | Germany | 1998–2011 | Traditional power metal sound which was pioneered in Hamburg by bands such as Helloween and Blind Guardian. | |
| Mob Rules | Germany | 1994–present | Melodic power metal from Germany. | |
| Moonlight Agony | Sweden | 1999–present | Common usage of odd chord progressions and an eerie/dreamlike atmosphere produced via the keyboard track. | |
| Morgana Lefay | Sweden | 1989–1997, 1999–2001, 2004–2007, 2012–present | Named after Morgan Le Fay of the Arthurian cycle. | |
| Morifade | Sweden | 1992–2015 | Symphonic power metal band hailing from the town of Vikingstad. | |
| Mystic Prophecy | Greece/Germany | 2000–present | Described as a mixture between heavier US power metal and more melodic European power metal. | |

== N ==
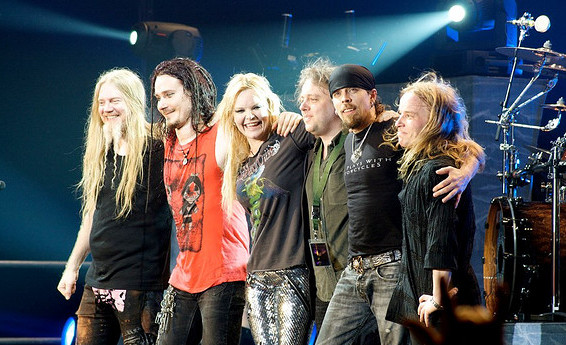
Nightwish in 2009

| Name | Origin | Years active | Brief summary | Note |
|---|---|---|---|---|
| Narnia | Sweden | 1996–2010, 2014–present | Christian power metal with speed metal guitar styles. | |
| Nevermore | United States | 1991–2011 | Technical speed metal from Seattle, USA. | |
| Nightmare | France | 1979–1987, 1999–present | Veteran French power metal group. | |
| NightMare World | England | 2006–present | Standard melodic power metal with some progressive influences. Their first full-length album was released in 2015. | |
| Nightwish | Finland | 1996–present | Nightwish performs symphonic metal with soaring female operatic vocals. One of the most successful symphonic/power metal acts. | |
| Nocturna | Italy | 2021–present | Symphonic power metal with gothic influences. | |
| Nocturnal Rites | Sweden | 1990–present | Power metal with melodic influences such as Iron Maiden. | |
| Nostradameus | Sweden | 1998–2016 | Melodic speed metal style. | |

== O ==
| Name | Origin | Years | Brief summary | Note |
|---|---|---|---|---|
| Obsession | United States | 1982–1989, 2004–present | Famous for spawning the career of singer Michael Vescera. | |
| Omen | United States | 1983–1988, 1996–present | One of the forefathers of power metal acts, launched with groups such as Metallica, Anthrax, Megadeth, and Slayer. | |
| Orden Ogan | Germany | 1996–present | Progressive and folk metal elements. | |
| Ostrogoth | Belgium | 1980-1988, 2002, 2010–present | Heavy metal band from Belgium. | |
| Oz | Finland | 1977-1991, 2010–present | Part of the group of early Finnish power metal bands. | |

== P ==
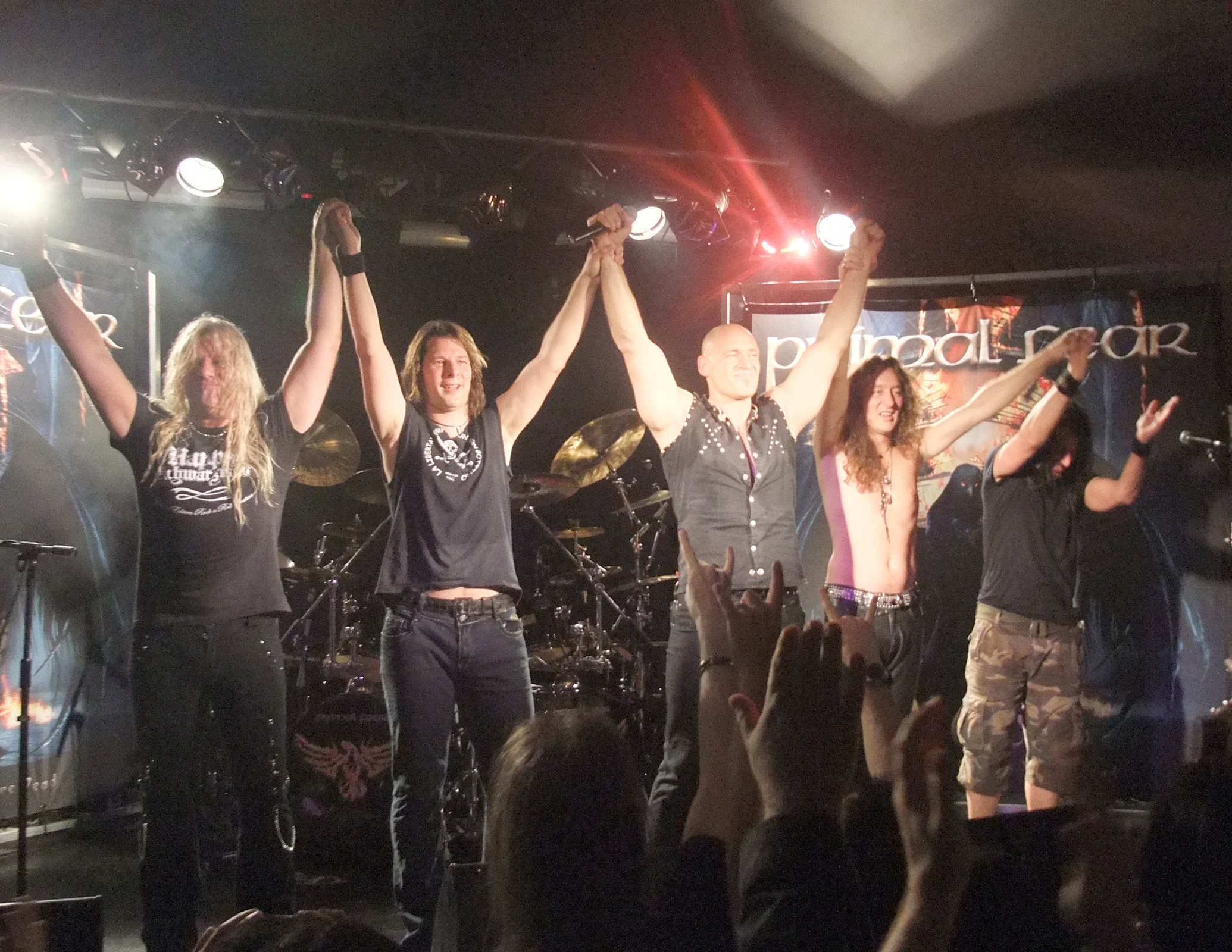
Primal Fear in 2009

| Name | Origin | Years active | Brief summary | Note |
|---|---|---|---|---|
| Pagan's Mind | Norway | 2000−present | Their music is influenced by Stargate, especially the theatrical film. | |
| Paradox | Germany | 1986–1991, 1998–present | Late 80s speed metal band from Würzburg, Bavaria. | |
| Paragon | Germany | 1990–present | Hamburg based power metal act. | |
| Pathfinder | Poland | 2007–present | Referred to as "the world’s best epic power metal band" and "multiple styles of power metal are pulled off while still retaining Pathfinder’s signature symphonic sound". | |
| Pegazus | Australia | 1993–present | 90s power metal band who wished to revive studs and leather in a straightforward metal act, rather than fantasy themes. | |
| Persuader | Sweden | 1997–present | Sound similar to bands such as early Blind Guardian, Iron Savior, and Nocturnal Rites. | |
| Pharaoh | United States | 1997–present | Known for multi-layered instrumentation and well produced albums. | |
| Phoenix Rising | Spain | 2007–present | Spanish symphonic power metal similar to bands such as Rhapsody Of Fire, Heavenly and Dark Moor. | |
| Powerglove | United States | 2005–present | One of the more prominent nintendocore bands, Powerglove covers classic video game tracks in an epic technical power metal style. | |
| Powermad | United States | 1984–1990 | An innovative early American speed metal act that mixed progressive and European styles in their sound. | |
| Power Quest | England | 2001–2013, 2016–present | The founder of the band being the keyboardist, the songs are more key driven than typical power metal bands. | |
| Power Symphony | Italy | 1991–2005 | Female fronted Italian power/progressive metal. | |
| Powerwolf | Germany | 2003–present | Notable for having dark themes and images, both musically and lyrically, both counteractions to traditional power metal music and including usage of corpse paint, gothic-tinged compositions and songs about Romanian werewolf and vampire legends. | |
| Primal Fear | Germany | 1997–present | Main lyrical themes are science fiction, often metaphorical. Founded by ex-Gamma Ray vocalist Ralf Scheepers and Mat Sinner. | |
| Pyramaze | Denmark | 2001–present | Collaborated with Iced Earth singer Matt Barlow for their third album. | |

== R ==
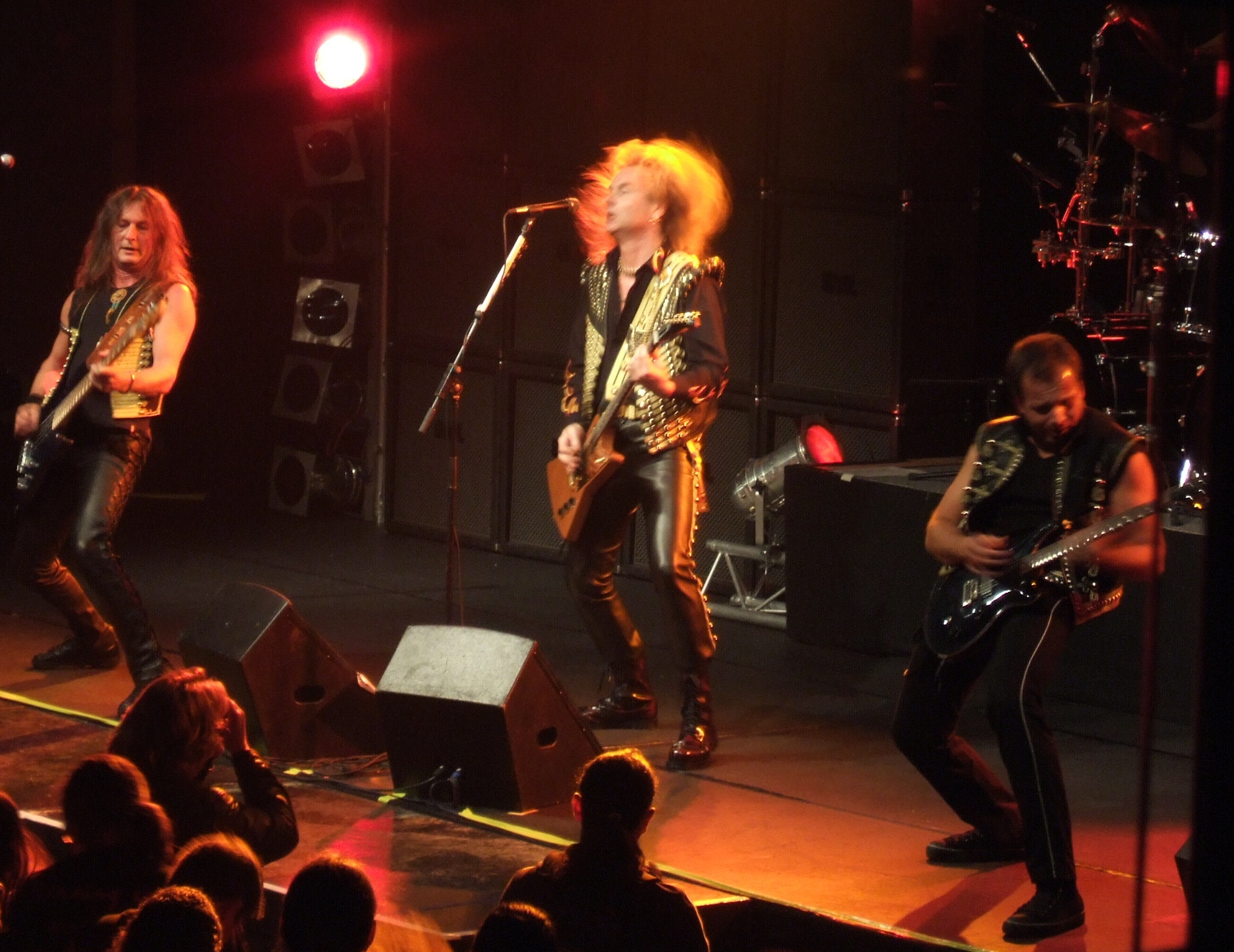
Running Wild live on stage in Bonn in 2005

| Name | Origin | Years active | Brief summary | Note |
|---|---|---|---|---|
| Rage | Germany | 1984–present | Part of the German heavy/speed/power metal scene to emerge in the early to mid-1980s, along with bands such as Helloween, Running Wild, Blind Guardian and Grave Digger. | |
| Rainbow | England | 1975–1984, 1994–1997, 2015-present | Started out combining mystical lyric themes with neo-classical metal prior to Dio's departure from the group. | |
| Raintime | Italy | 1999–2012 | Greatly influenced by Dream Theater in their initial releases. | |
| Rata Blanca | Argentina | 1986–1997, 2000–present | This Argentinian band was born out of a demo tape made as an attempt to connect with the UK market. | |
| Rebellion | Germany | 2001–present | Their first album was a concept album about William Shakespeare's work Macbeth. | |
| Reverend | United States | 1989–1993, 2000–present | Part of the "holy trinity" of US thrash metal, as well as Metal Church and Heretic. | |
| Redshark | Spain | 2012–present | The most famous Spanish Heavy metal band of the new wave. | |
| Revolution Renaissance | Finland | 2008–2010 | Formed by a former Stratovarius member. | |
| Rhapsody of Fire | Italy | 1993–present | One of the most prominent symphonic style power metal bands, recording with orchestras and involving vocalists such as Christopher Lee. | |
| Riot V | United States | 1975–1984, 1988–2012, 2013-present | Initially started out as straightforward heavy metal, upon revival in 1988 they began a departure towards power metal styles. | |
| Rob Rock | United States | 1983–present | Robert "Rob" Rock is best known for his guitar virtuoso acts. | |
| Royal Hunt | Denmark | 1989–present | Heavily keyboard-oriented power metal from Copenhagen. | |
| Running Wild | Germany | 1976–2009, 2011–present | Most famous for pioneering the idea of pirate themed metal, after initial satanic themes in their first two albums. | |

== S ==
| Name | Origin | Years active | Brief summary | Note |
|---|---|---|---|---|
| Sabaton | Sweden | 1999–present | Known for historical lyrical themes and a heavy but still European sound. | |
| Sacred Oath | United States | 1985–1988, 2005–present | The original four band members reformed after disbanding for 17 years, releasing successful new material. | |
| Sacred Steel | Germany | 1996–present | They intended to use the words "metal" and "steel" at least once in every song on their first album. | |
| Sanctuary | United States | 1985–1992, 2010–present | Their first recording was produced by Dave Mustaine of Megadeth. | |
| Saratoga | Spain | 1992–present | Pioneered the speed metal and power metal genres in Spain. Founded by former Baron Rojo and Obús musicians, their most successful era took place with Leo Jiménez as their singer (1999–2006). | |
| Savage Circus | Germany | 2004–present | Formed by drummer Thomen Stauch as a side project before leaving Blind Guardian. | |
| Savage Grace | United States | 1981–1993, 2009-2010 | Early power/speed metal style band from Los Angeles. | |
| Savatage | United States | 1978–2002, 2014–present | Known for the frequent usage of counterpoint style vocals. | |
| Scanner | Germany | 1986–present | Known for early forms of science-fiction based power metal. | |
| Scorpions | Germany | 1965–present | One of the best selling heavy metal bands of all time, influencing many of the 1980s subgenres including power metal. | |
| Secret Sphere | Italy | 1997–present | Italian symphonic power metal band brought together by guitarist Aldo Lonobile. | |
| Seraphim | Taiwan | 2001–present | Female-fronted power metal band from Taiwan. Their debut album was originally recorded in Chinese, later in English. | |
| Serenity | Austria | 2001−present | Started as power metal then gravitated towards a more pure symphonic metal. | |
| Seven Kingdoms | United States | 2007–present | A mix of European power metal and thrash. | |
| Seventh Avenue | Germany | 1989 - 2012 | Traditional metal from a Christian band, melodic inclinations. | |
| Seventh Wonder | Sweden | 2000–present | Progressive power metal with overarching story-based concept albums. | |
| Seven Thorns | Denmark | 1998-2005; 2007−present | A mix of Scandinavian and German power metal with neoclassical influences | |
| Seven Witches | United States | 1998–present | Composed of members of Symphony X, Savatage, and Helstar. | |
| Shadowkeep | England | 1999–present | One of the small amount of late 90s power metal bands to become prominent quickly. | |
| Shadowside | Brazil | 2001–present | Band with female vocals from Brazil drawing from influences of Thrash metal and Hard rock. | |
| Shadows of Steel | Italy | 1996–present | | |
| Shaman | Brazil | 2000–present | A successful spinoff of the largely popular Brazilian power metal band Angra. | |
| Silent Force | Germany | 1999–present | Formed by D. C. Cooper of Royal Hunt. | |
| Sinergy | Finland | 1997–2004 | Features strong female vocalist Kimberly Goss who has a deeper vocal range than normal. | |
| Six Magics | Chile | 1996–present | Band known for leading the Chilean Metal scene. | |
| Skylark | Italy | 1994–present | | |
| Slough Feg | United States | 1990−present | Also known as The Lord Weird Slough Feg. | |
| Skull & Bones | Argentina | 2011−present | Pirate styled power metal. | |
| Sonata Arctica | Finland | 1995−present | One of the most successful power metal groups of post 1990s. Known for their usage of keys and tenor/falsetto vocals, as well as emotional themes and wide-ranging style. | |
| Steel Attack | Sweden | 1997–present | Evolved from typical power metal medieval themes to more mature, mystical themes, including religion. | |
| Steel Prophet | United States | 1984–present | After ten years from their previous album, the band released new work in 2014. | |
| Stormwarrior | Germany | 1998–present | Their debut album was produced by members of Gamma Ray. | |
| Stratovarius | Finland | 1984–present | Considered one of the leading groups of the power metal and symphonic metal genre. | |
| Sunrise | Ukraine | 2003–present | One of the most famous power metal bands from Ukraine. | |
| Symfonia | Finland | 2010–2011 | Short-lived band formed by well-known Finnish power metal musicians as a new project. | |
| Symphony X | United States | 1994–present | Popularized the mixing of progressive metal sounds with power metal themes, influenced by pure progressive bands such as Dream Theater. | |
| Symphorce | Germany | 1998–2011 | Symphonic power metal band upheld by vocalist Andy B. Franck. | |

== T ==
| Name | Origin | Years active | Brief summary | Note |
|---|---|---|---|---|
| Tad Morose | Sweden | 1991–present | Swedish power metal band with steadily growing support from European countries. | |
| Taramis | Australia | 1983–1993 | Technical instrumentation style, originally the band was called Prowler. | |
| Tarantula | Portugal | 1981–present | Classical and symphonic focusing on dark and epic themes. | |
| Tarot | Finland | 1984–present | Frontman Marko Hietala was considered as the next-in-line for vocalist of Iron Maiden. | |
| Theocracy | United States | 2002–present | Originally a one-man project, the band mixes heavier power metal style with progressive metal. | |
| Thor | Canada | 1977–present | Canadian power metal band with | |
| Thunderstone | Finland | 2000–present | Created by ex-Antidote guitarist Nino Laurenne. | |
| Thy Majestie | Italy | 1999–present | Symphonic power metal with a darker tone than the norm. | |
| Tierra Santa | Spain | 1997–2008, 2010–present | Epic power metal, supported Dio in Spanish tours in the 90s. | |
| Time Requiem | Sweden | 2001–present | Created by Richard Andersson after he felt his previous project, Majestic had come to and end. | |
| Timeless Miracle | Sweden | 1995, 2001–2008, 2014–present | Originally named Trapped. Trapped was a traditional heavy metal band, whose sound evolved to become the melodies-driven power metal with influences of the classical and folk music; the lyrics are inspired by the horror movies and the Nordic tales. | |
| Trauma | United States | 1981–1985, 2011–present | Known for being the original band of Cliff Burton, the original bassist of Metallica. | |
| Turilli / Lione Rhapsody | Italy | 2018–present | Created by former Rhapsody of Fire members Luca Turilli and Fabio Lione. Prior to the band's formation, the same lineup performed under the Rhapsody moniker for the 20th Anniversary Farewell Tour, which celebrated 20 years of the original band's existence. | |
| Twilight Force | Sweden | 2011–present | Known for heavy usage of symphonic elements and writing announcements in fantasy-style text. | |
| Twilightning | Finland | 1998–2009 | Split up after the band's sound slowly shifted from power metal to a more 1980s rock sound. | |

== U ==
| Name | Origin | Years active | Brief summary | Note |
|---|---|---|---|---|
| U.D.O. | Germany | 1987–present | Traditional heavy metal founded by vocalist Udo Dirkschneider of veteran metal band Accept. | |
| Unisonic | Germany | 2009–present | A supergroup formed by former Helloween singer Michael Kiske and Gamma Ray leader Kai Hansen. | |
| Unleash the Archers | Canada | 2007–present | A modern melodic death/power metal band from British Columbia with a female vocalist. | |
| Unlucky Morpheus | Japan | 2008–present | | |

== V ==
| Name | Origin | Years active | Brief summary | Note |
|---|---|---|---|---|
| Van Canto | Germany | 2006–present | An a cappella group employing a drummer, they sing what they call "hero metal a capella". | |
| Vanishing Point | Australia | 1995–present | Symphonic and progressive with power metal influence. | |
| Versailles | Japan | 2007–2012, 2015–present | This Symphonic Power Metal band's concept is "the absolute youshikibi (beauty of form) sound and extremes of aestheticism". | |
| Viathyn | Canada | 2006–present | Progressive/power with a natural folkish feel likenable to Falconer. Themes of existentialism, storytelling, and natural beauty. | |
| Vicious Rumors | United States | 1979–present | Recognized for their guitar works and harmonies, as well as the variety of their music | |
| Victorius | Germany | 2004–present | | |
| Viper | Brazil | 1985–1996, 2004–2009, 2012–present | Heavily European-influenced speed metal style act which started in 1985. | |
| Virgin Steele | United States | 1981–present | In recent years, they have enriched their sound with elements of musical theatre, metal and symphonic metal. | |
| Vision Divine | Italy | 1998–present | Power/progressive style. | |
| Visions of Atlantis | Austria | 2000–present | Their equal combination of male and female vocals distinguishes the band and is reminiscent of bands such as Lacuna Coil. | |

== W ==
| Name | Origin | Years active | Brief summary | Note |
|---|---|---|---|---|
| WarCry | Spain | 2001–present | One of Spain's most famous metal acts. | |
| Warlord | United States | 1980–present | One of the progenitors of the US Power Metal style | |
| Warmen | Finland | 1999–present | Brainchild of the keyboardist of Children of Bodom Janne Wirman. | |
| Warrior | United States | 1983–present | One of the earlier US acts that developed a power metal style. | |
| White Skull | Italy | 1988–present | Retro-style female-fronted Italian act. | |
| Wisdom | Hungary | 2001–2018 | The band has a mascot "Wiseman" whom stories they often told over their songs. | _{[211]} |
| Wizard | Germany | 1989–present | The band was often called "Germany's answer to Manowar". | |
| Wind Rose | Italy | 2009–present | Wind Rose's aesthetic is based around Dwarves in a fantasy setting (notably from Warhammer Fantasy and The Lord of the Rings). | |
| Winter's Bane | United States | 1990–present | Tim "Ripper" Owens's first successful act prior to joining Judas Priest or Iced Earth. | |
| Wintersun | Finland | 2003–present | Wintersun contains elements of melodic death metal, and was formed as a side project to Ensiferum. | |
| Winter's Verge | Cyprus | 2004–present | Songs often have pirate themes and local character. Pioneers of the modern Cyprus metal stage. | |
| Wuthering Heights | Denmark | 1989–present | Songs often feature traditional folk instruments such as bagpipes, violins, and flutes. | |

== X ==
| Name | Origin | Years active | Brief summary | Note |
|---|---|---|---|---|
| X Japan | Japan | 1982–1997, 2007–present | Pioneers of the Japanese heavy metal movement promoting a shift towards western glam style. | |

== Y ==
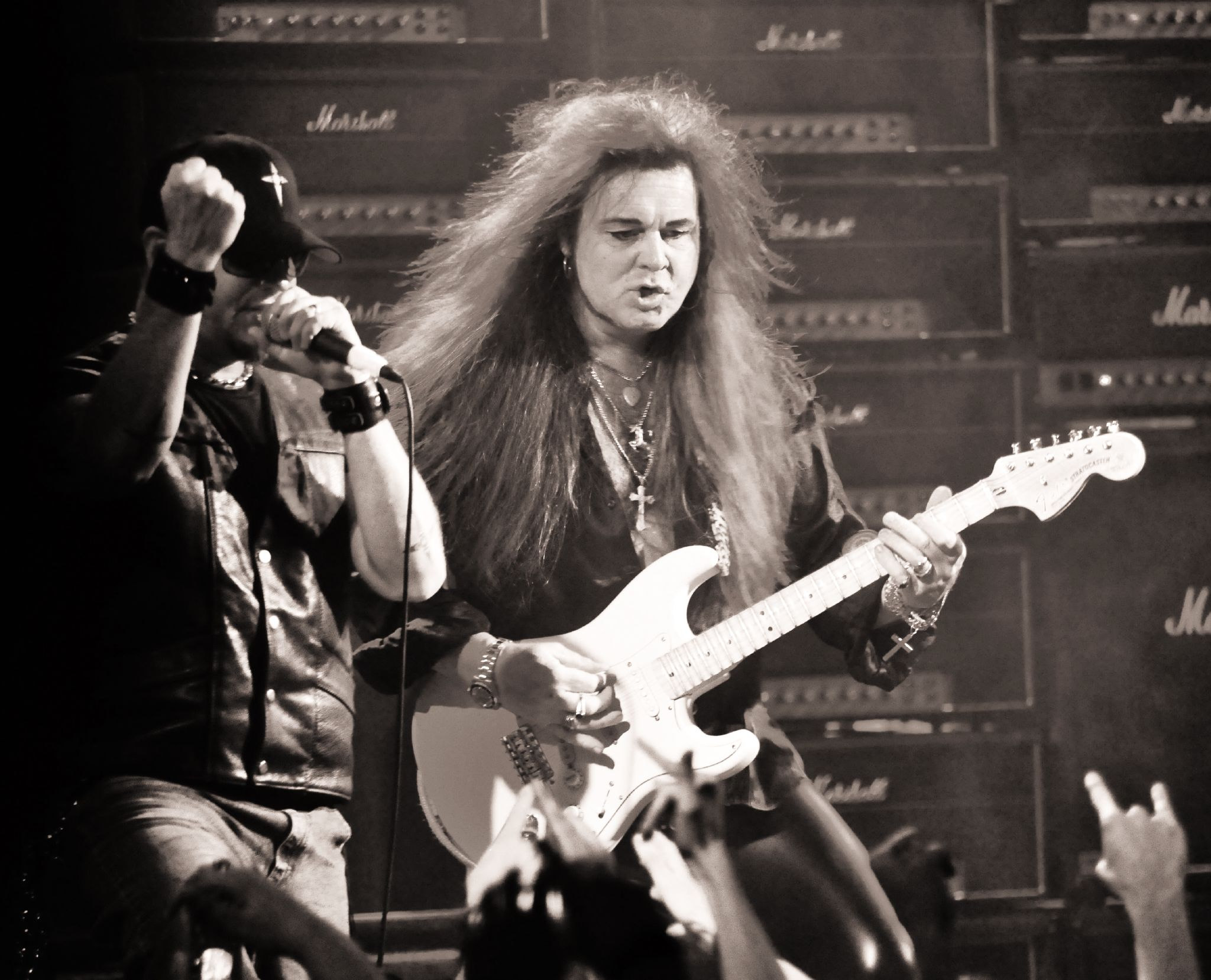
Yngwie Malmsteen performing in Barcelona

| Name | Origin | Years active | Brief summary | Note |
|---|---|---|---|---|
| Yngwie Malmsteen | Sweden | 1978–present | The virtuosity of his guitar work in any lineup aided the development of neoclassical metal. | |

== Z ==
| Name | Origin | Years active | Brief summary | Note |
|---|---|---|---|---|
| Zonata | Sweden | 1998–2003 | Known for heavy classical influences on both guitar and keyboard parts. | |

== See also ==
- List of heavy metal bands
