= List of speed metal bands =

This is a list of speed metal bands. Speed metal is a subgenre of heavy metal music that originated in the late 1970s from NWOBHM and hardcore punk roots. It is described by AllMusic as "extremely fast, abrasive, and technically demanding" music.

== List of bands ==
- 3 Inches of Blood
- Abattoir
- Acid
- Agent Steel
- Agony
- Aion
- Aisenshi
- Alltheniko
- Almafuerte
- Angel Dust
- Animetal
- Annihilator
- Anthrax
- Anvil
- Artillery
- Attaxe
- Atomkraft
- Blasdead
- Blind Guardian
- Bombarder
- Bullet
- Bulldozer
- Cacophony
- Cage
- Carnivore
- Cellador
- Chorny Kofe
- Cranium
- Cruise
- Crystal Viper
- Damien Thorne
- Deliverance
- Destruction
- Dorsal Atlantica
- Dorso
- DragonForce
- Early Man
- Enforcer
- Excalion
- Exciter
- Fantom Warior
- Flotsam and Jetsam
- Gamma Ray
- Gang Green
- Grave Digger
- Grim Reaper
- The Great Kat
- Grinder
- Hawaii
- Heathen
- Heavenly
- Heaven's Force
- Heller
- Hellhammer
- Helloween (early)
- Hellripper
- Helstar
- Heretic
- Hibria
- Hirax
- Impaler
- Impulse
- Intruder
- Iris
- Iron Angel
- Jag Panzer
- Jaguar
- Juggernaut
- Kat
- Kylähullut
- Lethal
- Liege Lord
- Lionsheart
- Living Death
- Loudness
- Malice
- Maninnya Blade
- Massacration
- Master
- Metal Church
- Memorain
- Metalium
- Metalucifer
- Midnight
- Misery Chastain
- Motörhead
- Mystic Prophecy
- Nasty Savage
- Necrodeath
- Nostradameus
- Overload
- Overkill L.A.
- Paradox
- Paragon
- Piledriver
- Powermad
- Pharaoh Overlord
- Pretty Maids
- Racer X
- Rage
- Raven
- Razor
- Redshark
- Reverend
- Rigor Mortis
- Riot V
- Risk
- Rob Rock
- Running Wild
- Rusty Eye
- S.A. Slayer
- Sacred Oath
- Sacred Steel
- Saratoga
- Savage Circus
- Savage Grace
- Scanner
- Seax
- Sex Machineguns
- Seventh Avenue
- Silver Fist
- Skull Fist
- Stone
- Stormwarrior
- Stress
- Striker
- Temple of Blood
- Tokyo Yankees
- Trauma
- Tremonti
- Tren Loco
- Turbo
- Ultimatum
- Unlucky Morpheus
- Vastator
- V8
- Vendetta
- Venom
- Venom Inc.
- Viper
- Voivod
- Warfare
- Warlock
- Warrant
- Watchtower
- Whiplash
- Wild Dogs
- Wizard
- Wolf
- X Japan
- Znowhite
- Zoetrope

== See also ==
- List of heavy metal bands by genre
