= Holy Dragons =

Kazakhstani metal band

- Also known as: Axcess, H-Dragons
- Origin: Almaty, Kazakhstan
- Genres: Power metal, heavy metal, speed metal
- Years active: 1992–present
- Labels: Metalism Records, MetalAgen, Union of Music, Pitch Black Records
- Members: Jürgen Thuderson; Chris Caine; Ivan Manchenko; Antonio Repablo; Zabir Shamsutdinov
- Past members: Holger Komaroff; Zerstorer; Ian Breeg; Daniel Thorne; Yurii Morev; Chris Larson
- Website: vk.com/holydragons

Holy Dragons (formerly known as Axcess or H-Dragons) is a Kazakhstani metal band, founded in 1992 in Almaty.

Since the beginning to the present day the main musical direction for the group has been heavy metal. The band sticks to the 1980s style.

In addition, one can trace the influence and identify the components of such styles as speed metal, power metal, hard rock, techno thrash and some other styles in the music of Holy Dragons.

The band recorded its first full-length album, Dragon Steel, in 1998. Since 2003, the band began to work with the Russian record label Metalism Records, some of the albums were released in cooperation with Soyuz Music, Metal Agen, Sound Age, etc.

In 2009, the band released the album Iron Mind as a free downloadable Internet release. Currently the group is working with independent label Pitch Black Records, based in Cyprus.

== History ==
=== Formation ===
Holy Dragons as a band were formed in 1992 in the then capital city of Almaty (since 1997 Astana has replaced Almaty as a capital of Kazakhstan). The band's creation date is considered to be 11 September 1992 when guitarist Jurgen Thunderson got together the first line-up with the singer Oleg "Holger" Komaroff, to make music in the style of hard rock and heavy metal. During the first years, the group was called "Axcess", which later was changed into its current name in 1997. The participants of the first line-up were: Bulat Sadvakassov – lead guitar, Marat Sadvakassov – drums and Roman "Africa" Cubashev (bass guitar). Under this name, the band recorded multiple demo tapes, which were distributed primarily through re-recording from one tape to another with a tape recorder among friends. Axcess – "In Magic Kingdom" (1992), Axcess (pre-Holy Dragons) – "Прыгни в Ад!" ("Jump into Hell") (1992), Axcess (pre-Holy Dragons) – "Дубовые Мозги" ("Oaken Brains") (1993) – most of the songs from those early demos later entered the licensed albums.

The band started to stylistically experiment in various metal genres and they became one of, if not the first, metal band Kazakhstan had produced. Since then, the line-up has undergone considerable changes with Thunderson remaining the sole constant member as a founder.

=== "Axcess" years (1992–1995) ===
Gradually, line-up was changed, Cubashev left the band to make his own reggae-project "Люди Солнца" ("People of the Sun"). He was replaced by bassist Denis Kozlov, playing on the bass-guitar and electronic organ. By mid-1993, the existing staff fell apart. Jürgen continues his musical career as a part of Izverg" (kaz), which played death metal at that time, and in a blues-rock "Benn Gunn Band", and Holger finds himself in the heavy metal band "Cerberus", where, however, his participation was occasional, and he started to be engaged in his own group of "Project Minstrel".

In 1994, the group gathers back again, with new recruits Veniamin Polovinko – bass guitar and Slava Greechenco – drums (ex-"Benn Gunn Band"), joined by Holger Komaroff. Two months after the start of the rehearsals, the group recorded a rehearsal demo Axcess – "Genocide", which included five tracks. After the recording of the demo, live performances and participation in local rock festivals at the end of 1994 and the beginning of 1995, the group splits. Jürgen continues to work as a part of the project "Heder", Holger goes to "Project Figaro". Greechenko and Polovinko – to "Benn Gunn Band" and "Deathrack" respectively.

=== Reformation (1995–1997) ===
By mid-1995, Jürgen decided to revive the group under a different name. Enlisting the support of a guitarist known under the pseudonym Chris "Thorheim" Caine (ex-"GB-5", "Lamia"), the newly formed group was looking for new members, as well as for the support from the former members of the group. This period was marked by a very brief participation of Veniamin Polovinko, and then Lekmar. Holger briefly appeared again only to disappear for a few years very soon. There were a lot of session drummers and other members of the group, coming and going at that period.

Eventually, the first demo album (under the "Holy Dragons" name), 8 songs demo "Halloween Night", was recorded in 1996, which was later developed into their debut album, Dragon Steel in 1998.

By 1997, with somewhat stable line-up (Anders "Caban" Kraft – vocals (ex-Beermaht, Holy Inquisition (kz)), Marina "Gill Sheffield" Mikhailova – bass guitar (ex-"Lamia", "GB-5", "Green Low"), the group becomes known as the Holy Dragons. Under that name the band goes into enters the studio for the first studio recordings and gives live performances. At that time the band recorded the first licensed album – "Dragon Steel" (an earlier version of the album, with Anders Kraft vocals), which was released in Kazakhstan by "Studio Iris" in the tape format. It took the band only 28 hours of studio time. For the promotion purposes the band presented two most successful tracks from the album in the form of a single, called "Wild Cat".

The band (although vocalist Anders "Caban" Kraft wasn't very much accepted by foreign listeners), showed solid heavy metal on this album. Perhaps it was the first complete recording of an album of the metal band from Kazakhstan (except for demo records), which has been available outside the country.

"Dragon Steel" became the first and last release for Anders "Caban" Kraft, bassist Gill Sheffield and drummer Simon, who were replaced by Daniel "Dan" Thorne, Steven Dreico and Seva Sabbath respectively. Later, vocals for this album were rewritten for CD format release with a new singer, who became Daniel "Dan" Throne.

=== The english-lyrics "classic" line-up (1998–2001) ===
Meanwhile, there were changes in the line-up again. There came and then left a keyboardist Konstantin Baev, then vocalist Anders "Caban" Kraft leaves and creates a band"Tornado" (kaz) (later joins– "Seduser Embrace" as a bass guitarist). The band starts to search for a new singer and there have been a lot of people, who went through the band, people like Tatiana "Gliuk" Gemashova and others. Despite the frequent changes in the line-up, the band recorded a demo "Knights of the Kamelot" with Jurgen vocal's, many songs from which were subsequently overwritten on the albums to follow, such as "Thunder in the Night" and "Judgment Day". Shortly after the recording is finished, Gill Sheffield left, and by the middle of July 1998 there came Daniel "Dan" Throne – vocals (ex-"Wooсk") and Steven Dreico – bass guitar (ex-"Wooсk"). The band overwrites the vocal lines on Dragon Steel (this version of the album became a cassette compilation "The Best"), released by Kazakhstan Fair Play studio in 1999. In 2008, the album was released by CD Russian label "Metalism Records". By the end of the year, the group was joined by Alex – (drums, ex-"Deathrack").

The year 1999 was mega-effective for the band. In 1999 the band gave a lot of live performances, starred in the TV show, wrote half an hour live video for the TV- program "City Jazz, City Blues", then recorded an album "Rock Ballads / Dragon Ballads" – consisting entirely of ballads, 8 songs, some of them were included into the compilation album "The Best" and some of them were also released as a bonus track to the earlier versions of CD- edition of "Judgment Day" and "Gotterdammerung", and a little later – "House of The Winds" (album, which is based on the songs composed in the 90s). "Rock Ballads/Dragon Ballads," spawned a music video for the song, "Christmas Time," and was released independently, as was their third album, "House of the Winds" in 1999. It was published in 2001 as a part of a cassette box set "Rage of the Dragon Lords". Later, in 2004 re- mastered album version (2004, "Obitel Vetrov"), with Russian-lyrics Holger Komaroff vocals was released on CD by "Metalism Records" in cooperation with the "Soyuz Music" and "Metalagen". All this activity was combined with concerts and even work "in the club format." Also in 1999, the band creates a website and puts their freshest album at that time, "House of the Winds" for free download in MP-3 format.

In 2000 "Thunder in the Night" was recorded. At this point, the drummer had left the band and Thunderson handled the drums himself. It was certainly a much more polished representation of the band, with far better art work and a shorter track listing of more polished songs.

In the same year Holy Dragons signed a contract with a Polish PR agency, Dragonight Records to release their fourth album, "Thunder in the Night" on the CD and TAPE versions, a limited edition. (источник 3 – официальный сайт группы) Later, in 2004 re- mastered version of this album (2004, "Polunochniy Grom") with Russian-lyrics Holger Komarov vocals was released on CD by "Metalism Records" in cooperation with the "Soyuz Music" and "Metalagen". The drums on the album were recorded by Jürgen Thunderson. The record contained some solid production work which represented a much clearer sound than some of their previous work, which was brought up soon after this album's release via a compilation album entitled, "Rage of the Dragon Lords", only the next year.

The beginning of 2001 was a time of discord and misunderstanding for the band. Instead of the next album, the band recorded a Russian-lyrics single "Strannik Zvezd" and partly English-lyrics demo "Warlock", which becomes the last work of Daniel Throne as a vocalist. Despite the local success, a compilation "Rage of the Dragon Lords" issued by the Kazakh studio Fair Play, which was a box set with which included albums "House of the Winds", "Thunder in the Night" and the single "Strannik Zvezd", it was impossible to stop the collapse of the band. On December 22d in 2001, Daniel "Dan" Throne and Steven Dreico leave the band. Briefly Jurgen gets to the microphone stand and a new bass guitar member comes, Muha Fly (bass guitar, backing vocals, ex-"Iron Cross" (kaz)) – but it didn't improve the situation.

That same year, an EP, "Warlock" was released before their next album, "Judgment Day", recorded in 2002, being released in January 2003.

=== Russian-lyrics line-up. "The Komaroff era" (2002–2009) ===
Soon Muha Fly leaves the group. The entire 2002 the rest of the band remained busy working on the next album. The basics of this work consisted in the re-written tracks from the "Halloween Night", "Knights of the Kamelot", "Warlock", and some new material.

"Judgment Day" marked the beginning of the Russian language period in the history of the band and also saw the debut of the new old singer, Holger Komaroff, as well as their first full length as a trio, following the departure of Steven Dreico, though second guitarist Chris Caine remained.

By the end of summer a new bass player Chris "Kuzmitch" Larson joined the band (being the member of the "Black Fox" (kaz)) and the new-old singer Oleg "Holger" Komaroff. The first rehearsal of the new line-up is held on September, 16 and already a month later, the group sends the album materials to the newly formed Moscow label "Metalism Records", which decided to release the album, together with the "giant" of the Russian music industry "Soyuz Music". In 2003 CD appears on the shelves, and in 2006 the second edition of the album with new artwork, re-mixing and digital re- mastering with 20-page booklet was released.

The work on the musical material was in full swing on the Russian version of the old material and new songs. At the beginning of 2003 there is a change of drummers and the group was joined by Yurii Morev (being the member of "Phoenix" (kaz)). The band recorded the album with the original title in German "Gotterdammerung" (known also under the name of "Sumerki Bogov" ("Twilight of the Gods"), the label translated the album title without informing the band about it.The album was released in the same year at "Metalism Records" in cooperation with the "Soyuz Music" as CD-format. In 2005 it was re-released with the new artwork and digital re-mastering with 20-page booklet. The work continues. In the same year, 2003 the band recorded three English-language versions of the songs from the album "Gotterdammerung" – which make up a demo-single called "Blood Of Elves", but because of the reaction of the English-speaking public for a very strong accent of Holger, this activity was stopped. That same year, the group took part in the first in Kazakhstan CD- collection dedicated to the local rock scene – "Underground KZ", pt.1 – in 2003 with the songs "Blood of Elves" and "Twilight of the Gods".

On 31 October 2004 "Metalism Records" in cooperation with the "Soyuz Music" and "MetalAgen" releases two band CDs "Obitel Vetrov" and "Polunochniy Grom" – the Russian-language version of the albums of 1999 and 2000 – "House of the Winds" and "Thunder in the Night" respectively. The band began recording their next album, but despite active studio and concert work, even at the regional level, on 28 October 2004, Morev and Larsson left the band.

In 2005 marked the group non-concert status and the release of the album "Wolves of Odin" (released by the "Metalism Records") in the speed- metal 80th style. Only in 2006 the complete line –up was formed when the band was joined by Anton Repalo and Andrey Evseenko (both – former "Otrajenie"). In the same year, "Metalism Records" releases another album, a conceptual "Black Moon Rising". The song "Tengri" from the album was included into the collection of the magazine "Salon AV" – "Ognivo: Russian Metal Hits”. The band recorded a demo for the song "Wolves of Odin" with Kriss Blackburn, singer of Swedish group "VII Gates". Over the next year the band was busy recording the album "Labirint Illyuziy” (“Labyrinth of Illusion"), which came out in 2007 in the traditional "MetalisM Records", this time – together with the "Sound Age Rec.".

On 7 January 2009 the next album "Jelezniy Rassudok" ("Iron Mind") came out in the beginning in the form of free Internet release, and a little later – on 20 April 2009 – in CD format on the label "Metalism Records". Soon bass guitarist Andrey Evseenko left the band and by the end of the year vocalist Holger Komarov also left the band. Holger s currently busy with his one-man-project "Oko / Rokolo".

After the next album "Iron Mind" when Holger Komaroff made a decision to step down as the band's vocalist and with his departure the Russian-lyrics period is ended, and the band returned to the English lyrics.

=== Virtual band (2009–2012) and "Project Holy Dragons" (2009–2011) ===
After Holger's departure the band converted into a studio project. The group returned to the English-lyrics format. A person, hiding under a pseudonym The Zerstörer, performed the functions of a singer and bass-guitarist, who made his recording debut with the band on the album, Runaway 12. The second half of 2009 and the beginning of 2010 marked active studio work, which resulted in two releases in 2010. He also recorded vocals for "Zerstorer – The Chapters of World War III" – a concept album dedicated to the mysteries of the Cold War and the nuclear confrontation of the superpowers. The album was out as a free Internet release as a result of this virtual membership.

This was to be his final release with Holy Dragons, and by the end of 2010 The Zerstörer was replaced by Ian Breeg, an associate of Rhapsody of Fire and Blind Guardian members, Oliver and Alex Holzwarth (Holzwarth Brothers), who was also a member of Brutal Godz and Hammerforce bands.

The band removed the word "project" from its name and went back to its original name. Version with Ian Breeg vocals is released in autumn of 2012 in CD format by the European label Pitch Black Records. The album is sold through a distribution network of Nuclear Blast and other labels.

In the same year, after finishing instrumental recording of the next forthcoming album Dragon Inferno, Jürgen created a solo electronic instrumental space rock-ambient project "The Heepnotizer", also available for free download.

But, Breeg recorded only one full-length album with the band, which was titled Zerstorer (and two singles: "Majestic 12" and "Three Ways of Genocide"), after that being replaced by Alexandr Kuligin, who made his recording debut with the band on "Dragon Inferno" (2014).

In the first half of 2012, bassist Ivan Manchenko joined the band. The band started active rehearsals of the new concert programme and finalized the work on the recordings of vocals for Dragon Inferno. The problems arise for the already recorded album, scheduled for the autumn of 2013. This schedule is ruined because of disagreements with Ian Breeg. Ian Breeg leaves the group, the group has to overwrite the vocal tracks of the album Dragon Inferno with guest vocalists. Soon the place near the microphone was taken by Alexandr Kuligin on the regular basis, however, all in the same "virtual" format. The album was released on the same label, Pitch Black Records, with the support of other labels.

=== H-Dragons (2013 -) ===
In 2013, the band created a side-project- H-DRAGONS, guitarist Jürgen Thunderson composed songs and became a lead singer for this project. H-DRAGONS initially focused on Russian-speaking audience, online distribution and the free distribution of their records. On 6 August 2013 H-DRAGONS presented their debut single "Subjective Reality" in the form of a free-distributed online release formats FLAC, MP3. In 2014 the band released four singles – "Sinister Piper", "Characters Cursed Sleep", "Toothless Wolf" and "Emptiness".

=== With Alexandr Kuligin (2014–2016) ===
In October 2014, Cyprus label Pitch Black Records releases a new album called "Dragon Inferno". In this album, the band made a bet on experimentation with vocals – in addition to the main singer Alexandr Kuligin, this album also featured two session vocalists, Sergey Zubkov and Artemiy Ryabovol. The album has 11 tracks, four of which were published on singles "Majestic 12" and "Three Ways of Genocide" in 2012 with vocals of Ian Breeg.

Holy Dragon's 2014 release has been awarded "Kazakhstan release of the year" by Global Metal Apocalypse blog and was included to Global Metal Apocalypse compilation GMA HQ 2014 with "Black Moon Rising" track.

In 2015 (as a free-distribution online format) there was published a five-song EP "Dragon Inferno Outtakes", which included the rejected versions of the songs of the album "Dragon Inferno".

In the end of 2015 the band takes part in the RUSSIAN-LANGUAGE TRIBUTE TO HELLOWEEN project by internet portal MASTERSLAND.COM and a sci-fi writer Valentin Lezhenda (co-author of the popular book series S.T.A.L.K.E.R., Metro 2033 and Inhabited Island, presenting a cover version of Helloween 's song Ride the Sky (Russian language version – "V Nebesa"). On the 31 st of October the track is released as a free Internet single, including both – the Russian and the English language versions.

The beginning of 2016 saw Holy Dragons opening a RUSSIAN-LANGUAGE TRIBUTE TO RAGE with RAGE cover "Sent by the Devil", which is MASTERSLAND.COM project together with the writer Valentin Lezhenda.

On 15 April 2016, the band released a new album under the name "Civilizator" via Pitch Black Records. The album was released as a CD and digitally.

=== Thora Thorheim as a live vocalist ===
Guitarist of the band Thora Thornheim aka Chris Caine has debuted as a live concerts vocalist in April 2015. Alexandr Kuligin, who has never performed as the frontman of the band live, had softly departed after the release of "Civilizator". In Autumn 2018 the band has finished the recording of a new album to be released by Pitch Black Records in 2019, with the person in charge of the vocals on it is yet to be revealed.

== Members ==
=== Current Line-up ===
(as of "Unholy and Saints" (2019) release)

- Chris "Thorheim" Caine – guitar, vocals
- Jürgen Thuderson – guitar, back vocals
- Ivan Manchenko – bass
- Zabir Shamsutdinov – drums

=== Past members ===
==== Vocals ====
- Anders "Caban" Kraft
- Tatiana "Gliuk" Gemashova
- Daniel "Dan" Throne
- Holger Komaroff
- The Zerstorer
- Ian Breeg (Dmitriy Yanovskiy)
- Alexandr Kuligin

==== Guitar ====
- Bulat Sadvacassov

==== Keyboards ====
- Denis Kozlov
- Konstantin Baev

==== Bass ====
- Roman "Africa" Cubashev
- Denis Kozlov
- Veniamin Polovinko
- Lekmar
- Marina "Gill Sheffield" Mikhailova
- Steven Dreico
- Muha Fly
- Chris "Kuzmitch" Larson
- Andrey Evseenko
- The Zerstorer

==== Drums ====
- Marat Sadvacassov
- Slava Greechenco
- Simon "Sam"
- Seva Sabbath
- Yurii Morev
- Antonio Repablo

== Discography ==
=== Albums ===
- Dragon Steel (album) – 1998
- Dragon's Ballads (album) – 1999
- House of the Winds (album) – 1999
- Thunder in the Night (album) – 2000
- Sudniy Den' (Judgment Day; album) – 2002
- Götterdämmerung (Sumerki Bogov) (Twilight of the Gods; album) – 2003
- Obitel Vetrov (album) – 2004
- Polunochniy Grom (album) – 2004
- Volki Odina (Wolves of Odin; album) – 2005
- Voshod Chyornoy Luny (Black Moon Rising; album) – 2006
- Labirint Illyuziy (Labyrinth of Illusion; album) – 2007
- Jelezniy Rassudok (Iron Mind; album) – 2009
- Runaway 12 (album) – 2010
- Zerstörer (The Chapters of the World War III; album) – 2010
- Zerstörer (album) – 2012
- Dragon Inferno (album) – 2014
- Civilizator (album) – 2016
- Unholy and Saints (album) – 2019
- Jörmungandr — The Serpent of the World (album) – 2022
- Fortress (album) – 2024
- Guardians of Time – Part I (album) – 2026

=== Under the name "Axcess" ===
- In Magic Kingdom (demo) — 1992;
- Прыгни в Ад! (Jump into Hell!; demo) — 1992;
- Дубовые Мозги (Oaken Brains; demo) — 1993;
- Геноцид (Genocyde; demo) — 1994;

=== Under the name "H-Dragons" ===
- H-Dragons — Субъективная Реальность (Subjective Reality; single) — 2013;
- H-Dragons — Зловещий Дудочник (Sinister Piper; single) — 2014;
- H-Dragons — Персонажи Проклятого Сна (Personages of a Damned Dream; single) — 2014;
- H-Dragons — Беззубый Волк (The Toothless Wolf; single) — 2014;
- H-Dragons — Пустота (Emptiness; single) — 2014;
- H-Dragons — Часовой (Sentinel; single) — 2017;
- H-Dragons — Навстречу Забвению (Towards Oblivion; single) — 2017;
- H-Dragons — Йормунганд, Змей Мировой (Jormungandr, Serpent of the World; single) — 2018;
- H-Dragons — Два ворона (single) — 2023;
- H-Dragons — Будущее это привилегия... Any Questions? (single) — 2023

=== Singles, demos, EPs, etc. ===
- Halloween Night (demo album) – 1997
- Enjoy the Storm / Wild Cat (single) – 1997
- Dragon Steel (demo album) – 1997
- Knights of Camelot (EP) – 1998
- Knights of Camelot (demo album) – 1998
- Strannik Zvezd (single) – 2001
- Warlock (demo EP) – 2001
- Blod Of Elves (demo EP) – 2003
- Wolves Of Odin (single) – 2005
- Majestic 12 (single) — 2012
- Three Ways of Genocide (single) — 2012
- Dragon Inferno Outtakes (EP) — 2015
- Ride the Sky / В Небеса (Helloween cover) (single) — 2015
- Sent by the Devil / К Нам Послан Дьявол (Rage cover) (single) — 2016;
- Illusory Sabbath (single) — 2016;
- Hangar 18 / Ангар 18 (Megadeth cover) (single) — 2015;
- Darkness Beyond the Other Side of Your Eyes (single) — 2023;
- The Game of Fate (single) — 2023;
- No Wind of Change (single) — 2023;
- Vampire Thrill (single) — 2023

=== Compilations ===
- The Best (compilation album) – 1999
- Rage of Dragon Lord (compilation album) – 2001
- Underground KZ, pt.1 – 2003 (songs «Кровь Эльфов» and «Сумерки Богов»);
- OGNIVO: Russian Metal Hits — 2007 ("Tengri" song);
- Pitch Black Records: 5 years of metal 2008–2013 (2013, "Project A119" song);
- Global Metal Apocalypse compilation GMA HQ 2014 (2014, "Black Moon Rising" song);
- Russian Helloween Tribute — 2015 («В Небеса» (("Ride The Sky");
- Pitch Black Records 2016 Sampler — 2014 (songs «Civilizator» and «Secret Friend»);
- Russian Rage Tribute — 2018 («К Нам Послан Дьявол» / "Send by the Devil");
- Pitch Black Records: 10 years of metal 2008—2018 (2018, "Hawker Hurricane" song);

=== Solo Projects ===
- Heepnotizer (album) – 2011;

== See also ==
- List of heavy metal bands
- List of Pitch Black Records artists
- List of power metal bands
- List of speed metal bands
- Music of Kazakhstan
