= Emerald Sun =

Greek power metal band

- Origin: Thessaloniki, Greece
- Genres: Power metal
- Years active: 1998–present
- Labels: El Puerto Records (current), Fastball music, Pitch Black, Limb Music
- Members: Stelios Tsakirides; Teo Savage; Fotis Toumanides; Pavlos Georgiadis; Nick Kaklanis
- Past members: Kostas Dimitris; Jimmy Santrazami; Giannis Argiris; Spyros Babadzanidis (aka S.P.Rodgatt); Jim Gavan; Andreas Giorgos; Teo Savage; Jim Tsakirides; Bill Kanakis; Johnnie Athanasiadis; Sefis Giolbasis; George Mpaltas
- Website: emeraldsungr.wixsite.com/emeraldsun

Emerald Sun is a Greek power metal band from Thessaloniki formed in 1998 by Johnie Athanasiadis and Jimmy Santrazami. They signed with El Puerto Records in 2021.

== Discography ==
- High in the Sky (Demo, 1998)
- The Story Begins (Promo album, 2005)
- Escape from Twilight (Studio album, 2007)
- Regeneration (Studio album, 2011)
- Metal Dome (Studio album, 2015)
- Under the Curse of Silence (Studio album, 2018)
- Kingdom of Gods (Studio album, 2022)
