= Pitch Black Records =

- Pitch Black's logo
- Founded: December 2007
- Founder: Phivos Papadopoulos
- Distributor: Code7/Proper Music Group RockInc. Entertainment Multiland Record Heaven Sentinel Steel Records The Orchard; (Digital)
- Genre: Heavy metal
- Location: Nicosia, Cyprus
- Official website: PitchBlackRecords.com

Pitch Black Records is a Cypriot independent record label headquartered in Nicosia. Established in December 2007 by Phivos Papadopoulos, the label has primarily released albums by heavy metal bands. The label also organises various concerts in Cyprus.

== Overview ==
Pitch Black Records was founded in December 2007 by guitarist Phivos Papadopoulos, to release the first studio album of his band Diphtheria. Their album To Wait for Fire was released on the label in 2008. According to Papadopoulos, "We just didn't feel like going through the whole procedure of finding a label but at the same time felt very strongly about putting out that album. [...] So it seemed very logical at the time to set up the label." The label's name can create the misconception that the label only deals with black metal, but it is actually a play on the common sight-related phrase, referring in this case to musical pitch.

By April 2012, bands such as Greece's Emerald Sun and Kazakhstan's Holy Dragons had been signed. In April 2013, the label released Bloodbrothers II, a compilation of Cypriot bands on the label. It also released an app for iOS and Android to provide information on Cyprus' rock and metal scene. In March 2013, the label released a free 20-track sampler containing a song from each release since 2008.

== Distribution ==
Physical distribution is handled mainly through Pitch Black's online store. The label also has distribution partnerships with Code7/Proper Music Group for the United Kingdom, Ireland and rest of the world; Rock Inc. Entertainment for Belgium, Luxembourg, and the Netherlands; Multiland for Czech Republic and Slovakia; Record Heaven for Scandinavia and Sentinel Steel Records for North America. Digital distribution is carried out through major digital stores such as Bandcamp, iTunes, Napster, eMusic, and Deezer. Releases are also available for streaming through mainstream platforms such as Spotify, Amazon Music, and Tidal. Digital distribution is handled by The Orchard.

== Concerts ==
The label organises concerts all around Cyprus, usually with international acts headlining and local bands supporting. Past headliners have included Tokyo Blade, Paul Di'Anno, and Orphaned Land.
