= From the Cradle to the Brave =

Studio album by Highland Glory
- Released: 17 March 2003
- Recorded: Toproom studios September - December, 2002.
- Genre: Power metal
- Length: 53:49
- Label: Massacre Records
- Producer: Highland Glory, Marius Olaussen

Highland Glory chronology
From the Cradle to the Brave (2003)	Forever Endeavour (2005)

From the Cradle to the Brave is the first album by the Norwegian power metal band Highland Glory.

== Track listing ==
1. One Last Chance - 04:50
2. Beyond The Pharaoh's Curse - 05:15
3. A Warriors Path - 05:35
4. This Promise I Swear - 04:55
5. Land Of Forgotten Dreams (part 1) - 06:45
6. Land Of Forgotten Dreams (part 2) - 05:52
7. Wear Your Gun To Neverland - 08:19
8. Will We Be Again - 04:29
9. From The Cradle To The Brave - 07:46

== Personnel ==
=== Musicians ===
- Jan T. Grefstad - vocals
- Jack R. Olsen - guitar
- Lars Andre Larsen - guitar and keyboard
- Knut E. Tøftum - bass
- Morten Færøvig - drums

=== Production ===
- Engineered and mixed by Børge Finstad.
- Marius Olaussen and Lars Andre Larsen - assistant engineers.
- Produced by Highland Glory and Marius Olaussen.
- Mastered by Morten Andersen.
- Mark Wilkinson - artwork.
- Jack Roger Olsen - cover concept.
- Håkon Grav - band photos
