= Sunrise (Ukrainian band) =

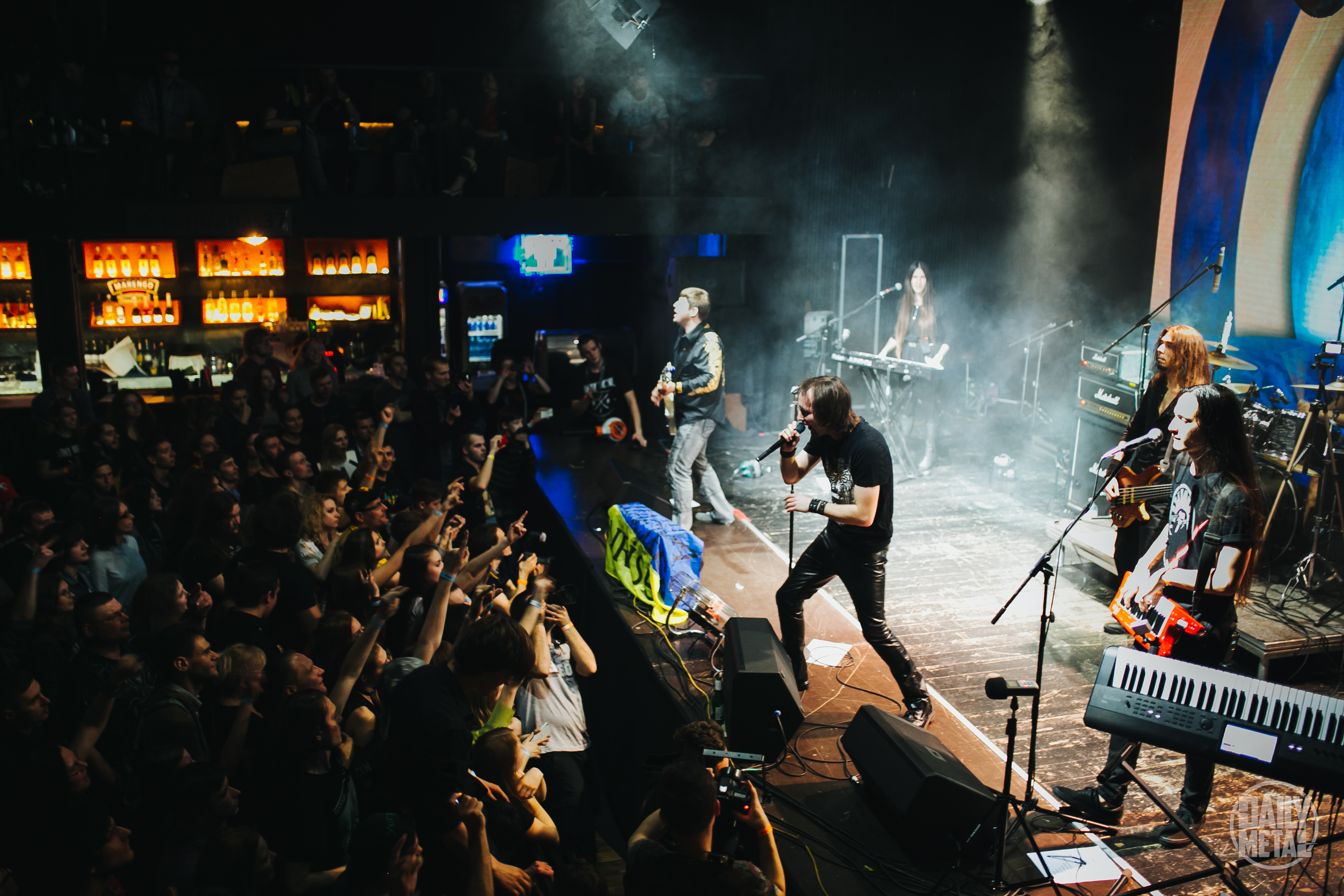

Background information
- Origin: Kyiv, Ukraine
- Genres: power metal
- Years active: 2003–present
- Label: Moon Records
- Website: www.sunriseband.net

Sunrise is a Ukrainian power metal band from Kyiv.

== History ==
Sunrise was formed in Kyiv in 2003. The style the band plays in is defined as melodic power metal. Most songs of the band are sung in English and a few in Ukrainian. Lyrics are all about quest of finding one's place in the world, self-realization and self-discovery, questioning the purpose of life, the meaning of love and relationships. All that and music itself are to induce feelings and provoke thoughts in listeners.

In February 2007 the band finished recording its debut album Liberty which was released on February 1, 2008, on Russian label Metalism Records. In spring 2009 Sunrise finished recording of their second album called Trust Your Soul which was released on January 30, 2010, on Italian label «Heart of Steel/Emmeciesse Music Publishing». Since October 2009 Sunrise songs namely "Trust Your Soul" and Helloween cover "If I Could Fly" are featured on the biggest Ukrainian rock radio station Radio ROKS.

On January 19, 2016, the band released their third full-length album, Absolute Clarity, which was crowdfunded. The album has received positive reviews from international metal webzines. This album became very popular in Japan and took 3 place among imported albums in the chart of Burrn! magazine.

On February 2, 2017, Sunrise released their concert DVD – Through The Eyes Of Infinity, which became the first ever DVD on the Ukrainian power metal scene.

At the beginning of that year, Sunrise shared the stage with German heavy metal band Rage. In the early spring the band signed up with the Ukrainian record label Moon Records, and on April 4 released Ukrainian single «Дар» (The Gift).

In 2018, Sunrise celebrates its 15th anniversary. The band went on a tour around the cities of Ukraine, which began on February 8 with a big concert in Kyiv, with the participation of the Orchestra of the Armed Forces of Ukraine.

Their fourth LP release became available in May 2021, with its first songs being released individually throughout 2020. It's their most internationally collaborative album yet to-date.

== Band members ==
- Kostiantyn Naumenko — drums (2003–2004), vocals (2003-present)
- Dariya Naumenko — vocals (backing), keyboards (2016–present)
- Vladyslav Sedov — bass (2018–present)
- Yevheniy Vasiliev — guitar (2018–present)
- Oleksandr Ignatenko — drums (2012–2015, 2018–present)

== Discography ==
=== Albums ===
- Liberty (2007)
- Trust Your Soul (2009)
- Absolute Clarity (2016)
- Equilibria (2021)

=== EPs ===
- Illusion Of Life (2006)
- Dreamer Online (2009)
- Hope And Pray (2013)

=== Singles ===
- "Дар" (2017)

=== Videography ===
- Through The Eyes Of Infinity DVD (2017)
