= Seax (band) =

American speed metal band

- Origin: Worcester, Massachusetts, U.S.
- Genres: Speed metal; heavy metal; NWOTHM; punk rock
- Years active: 2009–present

Seax (stylized as "SEAX") is an American speed metal band founded in 2009 in Worcester, Massachusetts. They play mostly speed metal with heavy metal elements. They were the opening act for a British heavy metal band Raven. The band has its own mascot named Sid Psycho.

== History ==
The band was formed in August 2009 by guitarist Hel and bassist Martin Roche. Joining in early 2011 were vocalist Carmine "Blades" DeCicco and Divaldo "Dee" Gustavo, replacing drummer Rich. A short time later, Roche left the band due to an arm injury, after which he was replaced by Matt C Axe. In the same year, the first performances began, the very first at the Hotel Vernon in Worcester. In August of that year, the debut album High on Metal was recorded and released in May 2012. Later in the year, drummer Derek Jay and guitarist Eli Firicano joined as new members. Several tours and appearances at various festivals, such as the Warriors of Metal in Ohio, followed, and the Ragnarokr in Chicago. In addition to several festival appearances, two tours and over 70 concerts were held. After further lineup changes, the second album To the Grave was recorded in 2013 under the direction of Firicano. Steve "Ace" Hammer was present as the new singer. After being mixed by Firicano, the material was mastered by Jack Control at Enormous Door Mastering . A few months after recording, Ax moved to the East Coast of the United States, after which he was replaced by Mike "Razzle" Bones. To the Grave was released in December 2014. A few months later, DeCicco returned to the band. After a couple of tours, work on the third album began. It was mixed and mastered again by Firicano before being mastered by Jason Buntz of Enormous Door Mastering. It was released in September 2016 under the name Speed Metal Mania. The band then embarked on a first tour of the West Coast of the United States and featured at Frost and Fire in Ventura, California.

== Members ==
- Helvecio Carvalho – guitars
- Cristiano Lobo – bass
- Fife Samson – guitars
- Carmine DeCicco – vocals
- Derek Jay – drums

== Discography ==
- 2012 – High on Metal
- 2014 – To the Grave
- 2017 – Speed Metal Mania
- 2019 – Fallout Rituals
- 2022 – Speed Metal Inferno
