= Highland Glory =

Norwegian band

- Origin: Kolbotn, Norway
- Genres: Power metal
- Years active: 2001–present
- Label: Massacre Records
- Members: Jan Thore Grefstad; Per Olav Olsen; Halvor Gustafson; Knut Egil Tøftum; Jarle Byberg
- Past members: Trine Elise Johansen; Lars Andrè Rørvik Larsen; Morten Færøvig; Håvard Indrebø; Stian Andre Braathen; Jack-Roger Olsen
- Website: Highlandglory.com

Highland Glory is a Norwegian power metal band, founded in the spring of 2001 by members of Phoenix Rizing. After releasing two albums worldwide, Rise from the Ashes (1998) and Eternal Crusade (2000), the band had changed their singer and formed Highland Glory.

With a fresh new start and an increased potential, the band developed their style of melodic metal in a heavier and more traditional direction on the debut album, From the Cradle to the Brave (2003). The artwork was created by Mark Wilkinson (famous for his work with Marillion, Fish, Iron Maiden, Judas Priest, etc.), who has worked for the band ever since. Still signed to Face Front (the label run by Frode Øien, chief editor of Scream Magazine) for Scandinavia, but the debut-album was licensed to Massacre Records for the rest of the world. The follow-up “Forever Endeavour” (2005) took the different aspects of the band's sound even further, showing a natural, yet darker and more atmospheric progression. In the autumn of 2007 singer Jan Thore Grefstad left the band, and was replaced by Trine Elise Johansen in the winter of 2008. The change from a male to a female singer naturally affected the band's sound, but the trademark still proved to be intact on the album "Twist of Faith" (2011), yet the band had developed in a more mid-tempo and even more melodic direction. Having previously only toured their native country, the band finally got to play outside of Norway, in both Sweden and Germany. The band parted ways with singer Trine Elise Johansen, keyboard-player/guitarist Lars Andre Larsen and drummer Morten Færøvig during the autumn and winter of 2011. A year later guitarist Per Olav Olsen, drummer Stian Andre Braathen, keyboard-player Halvor Gustafson and singer Håvard Indrebø finally completed the new line-up, which only lasted a year. The band's original singer Jan Thore Grefstad returned in the winter of 2013, after showcasing his talent in Swedish metal band Saint Deamon, Norske Talenter (Norway's Got Talent) and The Voice – Norges beste stemme.

On January 29, 2017, guitarist Jack Roger Olsen announced his departure from the band via the band's official Facebook page, citing lack of motivation and progress.

== Band members ==
- Jan Thore Grefstad – Vocals (2001–2007, 2013–present)
- Per Olav Olsen – Guitar (2012–present)
- Halvor Gustafson – Keyboard (2012–present)
- Knut Egil Tøftum – Bass (2001–present)
- Jarle Byberg – Drums (2015–present)

== Former members ==
- Trine Elise Johansen – Vocals (2008–2011)
- Lars Andrè Larsen – Guitar, Keyboard (2001–2011)
- Morten Færøvig – Drums (2001–2012)
- Stian Andre Braathen – Drums (2012–2015)
- Håvard Indrebø – Vocals (2012–2013)
- Jack Roger Olsen – Guitar, backing vocals (2001–2017)

== Discography ==
- From the Cradle to the Brave (2003)
- Forever Endeavour (2005)
- Twist of Faith (2011)
