= Power Symphony =

Heavy metal band from Italy

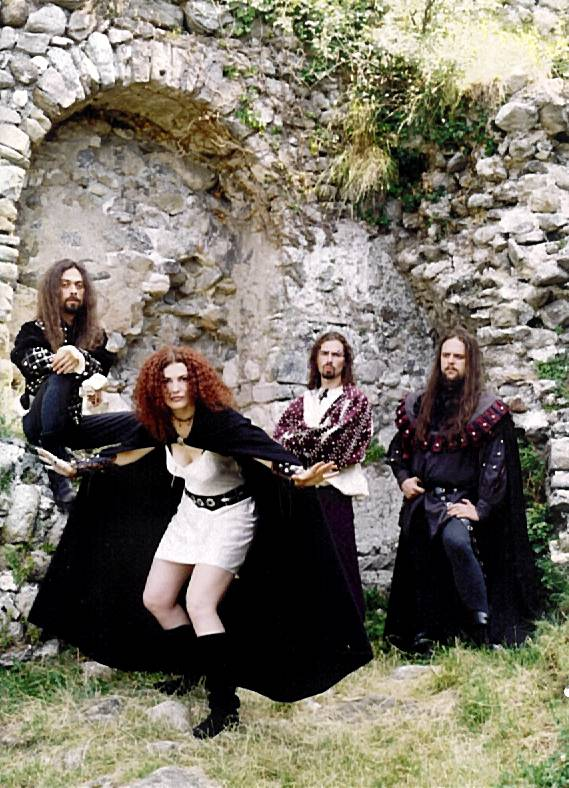

Background information
- Origin: Milan, Italy
- Genres: Progressive metal, Power metal
- Years active: 1991–2005
- Labels: Northwind Records; Pavement Music; Evillot Records
- Past members: Lino Sistu; Fabio Iannone; Marco Volpe; Roberto Dussi; Mauro Cantarella; Claudio Berra; Salvatore Nicoloso; Michela D'Orlando; Marco Cecconi; Daniele Viola
- Website: http://www.powersymphony.com/

Power Symphony was an Italian heavy metal band from Milan, Italy. The band formed in the beginning of the 1990s. The band released two full-length albums and one EP. Although no official statement has been made to the public as to the disbanding of the group, lack of activity seems to point in that direction. Their third studio album, Mother Darkness, never saw release and their website stopped being updated in 2004.

Since the band has fallen silent, its members have pursued other endeavors.

Vocalist Michela D'Orlando has pursued her passion of Historical European martial arts (HEMA), joining a club named Ordine delle Lame Scaligere. A prevalent theme in her lyrics and the band's imagery, she specializes in the steel longsword, having ranked as high as 4th in the world.

Bassist Daniele Viola joined the band Lacus Mortis as their guitarist around the time of Power Symphony's silence. The band lasted from 2003 until 2007. He also played bass in the band Aedera Obscura.

== Lineup ==
=== Final line up ===
- Michela D'Orlando - vocals
- Marco Cecconi - guitars
- Daniele Viola - bass

=== Former members ===
- Mauro Cantarella - lead guitar
- Nicola Conte - rhythm guitar
- Fabio Iannone - bass
- Claudio Berra - keyboards
- Marco Volpe - keyboards
- Lino Sistu - drums
- Roberto Dussi - drums
- Mauro De Brasi - drums
- Heavy - drums

== Discography ==
- Power Symphony (demo) (1995)
- Evillot (1999)
1. Battles In The Twilight 7:31
2. Shores Of My Land 8:14
3. Evillot 8:24
4. The Curse Of Every Man 6:28
5. Inferno Suite (Into The Shadowed Forest) 1:35
6. Inferno Suite (Inferno / Confutatis) 6:53
7. I Am The Bard 12:37

At the 1:41 mark of I Am The Bard the track goes silent until 11:58. At 11:59, on the right channel, the lines "Eve of the blooding, the change is not complete And goodness overcomes me Memories are talking to me They speak to me, they scream to me, they tell me things They say I've astray... They say "You've gone astray"." from the song Evillot are played backward with tones changing pitch.

- Lightbringer (album) (2000)
1. The Way of the Sword 5:17
2. Lucifer 6:19
3. Gethsemane 5:35
4. Never Dream Of Goodness (Evillot Pt. II) 5:12
5. Song Of Men 5:10
6. Quest For Knowledge 6:16
7. The Necromancer 14:43

At the 1:41 mark of The Necromancer the track goes silent until 12:48. At 12:49 phrases from the song "Lucifer" are sung, "Isn't he charming?" on the right channel alternating with "Isn't he tempting?" on the left channel with the volume increasing until the end of the track.

- Futurepast (EP) (2002)
1. Nine Moons 7:59
2. Infinite Machine 4:43
3. Blood Of My Enemies (Manowar Cover) 4:01
4. Army of Saints (Demo Version) 5:51
5. Mother Moon (Demo Version) 4:06
- Mother Darkness (unreleased) (2004)
1. Only The Worthy 4:28
2. Wonder Child 5:16
3. Crown Of Thorns 4:08
4. The Song Of Beasts And Men (Evillot Part III) 3:39
5. Infintie Machine 4:43
6. Nine Moons 6:03
7. Mother Darkness 5:36
8. Seeds Of Glory 4:34
9. At The Gallow's End 5:51
10. At The Gallow's End (Alternate Mix) 5:49
11. Seeds Of Glory (Alternate Mix) 4:34
