= Trauma (American band) =

American heavy metal band

- Original Lineup in 1981

Background information
- Origin: Hayward, California, U.S.
- Genres: Heavy metal; speed metal; power metal
- Years active: 1981–1986, 2013–present
- Labels: Shrapnel; Metal Blade; Pure Steel; The Orchard/Sony; Rivet; Massacre
- Members: Kris Gustofson; Steve Robello; Brian Allen; Michael Spencer; Casey Trask
- Past members: Dennis Shafer; Cliff Burton; George(Tiger) Lady; Lucas Advicula; Michael Overton; Ross Alexander; Glen Gordon; Marcel Eaton; Kurt Fry; Jeff Jones; Bobby Cannon; Donny Hillier; Greg Christian; Joe Fraulob; Rob Churchfield; Dan Cunningham

Trauma is an American heavy metal band formed in 1980 by Mike Overton and George Lady. It released one single, "Such A Shame" on Metal Massacre 2 by Metal Blade records in 1982, which featured Cliff Burton (Bass), Dennis Shafer (drums) and Donny Hiller (vocals) and Overton, Lady (guitars). It is best recognized with Cliff Burton in its initial lineup, who left in 1982 to become the bassist for Metallica.

Trauma released one album, "Scratch and Scream" in 1984 on Shrapnel Records. It received decent reviews from Keerang, Creem, Metal Forces, and is considered by some a cult classic of bay area power metal. Members: Mike Overton, Ross Alexander, Luke Advincula, Donny Hiller, Kris Gustafson.

Kris Gustofson and Luke Advincula left in 1986 to be replaced by Rob Churchfield (bass) and Dan Cunningham (drums, Dublin Death Patrol) During that reformation in late 1986 and working on their second album, Donny Hillier left the band to sing with Heist and Trauma disbanded.

Trauma was approached by various record companies in 2012 to rerelease Scratch and Scream. In 2013 to avoid anymore pirating of the album, Shrapnel Records rereleased Scratch And Scream with three remastered bonus tracks featuring Cliff Burton.

Also in 2013 Donny Hillier (vocals) and Kris Gustofson reformed Trauma with Kurt Fry and Marcel Eaton to start performing live again. In 2015 this line up recorded Rapture and Wrath. Numerous member changes occurred over the next few years and in 2018 released “As The World Dies” with Greg Christian (Testament) (Bass) Joe Fraulob (guitar) and Steve Robello (guitar).

During preparations for recording their next album, on September 28, 2020, Donny Hillier passed away following an undisclosed illness; he was replaced by vocalist Brian Allen nearly a year later on August 24, 2021, and recording of the "Awakening" album began soon after. It was released in 2022.

On December 6, 2022, Marty Friedman and Trauma were announced as special guests for Queensrÿche's 2023 Digital Noise Alliance Tour; on February 21, 2023, Casey Trask was named as substitute rhythm guitarist for Joe Fraulob on that tour.

The band's last lineup consisted of Kris Gustofson, Steve Robello, Brian Allen, and Michael Spencer, with Casey Trask as their touring rhythm guitarist.

Brian Allen is currently singing and touring with Metal Church.

At the present time in 2026 there is no news of Trauma recording or playing live.

== Band members ==
=== Current members ===
- Kris Gustofson – drums (1982–1986, 2013–present)
- Steve Robello – lead guitar, backing vocals (2017–present), bass (2014–2017),
- Brian Allen – lead vocals (2021–present)
- Michael Spencer – bass (2022–present)
- Casey Trask – rhythm guitar, backing vocals (2023–present)

=== Former members ===
- Donny Hillier – lead vocals (1981–1986, 2013–2020; his death)
- Michael Overton – rhythm guitar (1981–1986)
- (George) Tiger Lady – lead guitar (1981–1983)
- Cliff Burton – bass (1981–1982; died 1986)
- Dennis Shafer – drums (1981–1982)
- Lucas Advicula – bass (1982–1985)
- Ross Alexander – lead guitar (1983–1986)
- Glen Gordon – bass (1984–1985)
- Kurt Fry – guitars (2013–2015)
- Marcel Eaton – bass (2013–2014)
- Jeff Jones – lead guitar (2015–2017)
- Bobby Cannon – lead guitar (2016–2017)
- Joe Fraulob – rhythm guitar (2017–2023)
- Greg Christian – bass (2017–2022)
- Rob Churhfield- Bass (1986)
- Dan Cunningham - Drums (1986)

== Discography ==
- Scratch and Scream (1984)
- Rapture and Wrath (2015)
- As the World Dies (2018)
- Awakening (2022)

== See also ==
- List of bands from the San Francisco Bay Area
- List of heavy metal bands
- List of speed metal bands
