= Tren Loco =

Argentine heavy metal band

- Origin: Grand Bourg, Buenos Aires, Argentina
- Genres: Heavy metal, speed metal, thrash metal
- Years active: 1990–present
- Labels: Icarus Records, Yugular Records
- Members: Gustavo Zavala; Carlos Cabral; Dany Wolter; Cristian "Zombie" Gauna; Pablo G. Soler
- Website: www.TrenLoco.net

Tren Loco is an Argentine heavy metal band formed in the suburban town of Grand Bourg, in Buenos Aires Province. Their lyrics relate social issues, like "Clase trabajadora" (Working class), "Fuera de la Ley" (Outlaw) and "Lucila"; others are about political issues, such as "Pampa del Infierno" (Hell's Land) and "Nos vemos en Cutral-Co" (See you at Cutral-Co). They also write about personal matters: "Endemoniado" (Possessed), "No me importa" (I do not care) and "A ultranza" (To the end). The group's name is inspired by the classic Ozzy Osbourne song: Crazy Train.

== History ==
The bass player Gustavo Zavala created a new band in 1990, after the breakup of his previous band, Apocalipsis. He called the guitarist Rubén El Turco Atala, the drummer El Pollo Fuentes and the singer Gabriel Marian. The songs composed by this line-up were published in the album Apocalipsis in 1985. A month later, the singer Carlos Cabral leaves the band Dhak and joins Tren Loco, at the same time Mauricio Pregler joins as the second guitarist and Sergio Rojas as keyboardist.

In early 1991, they recorded their first demo at Sonovision studios, in Buenos Aires, with Álvaro Villagra as the producer. That same year, on June 23, they performed a show at Halley Discothèque and started the competition for the Yamaha Band Explosion.

They finally reached to the finals in Tokyo, Japan, where they played at the Budokan Stadium, competing with bands from Germany, Spain, United States, France and England. Tren Loco received the Special Jury Prize and signed a contract with the multinational label record company PolyGram, in 1992. Their first album Tempestades (Storm) was recorded in CD, cassette and vinyl. That same year, the band acts as support of Saxon in Buenos Aires.

In 1994, the Polygram contact finished and El Turco Atala and Rojas left the band. As a quartet again their sound changed being more raw and direct. Tren Loco recorded an EP with new songs: "Patrulla bonaerense" (Buenos Aires Patrol), "Al Acecho" (Spying), "Paz de Mentira" (False peace), "Luca no murió" (Luca is not dead), "Vengan Juntos" (Come together) and "O Sole Mio".

As an independent band they recorded their second album: No me importa! at Del Abasto al Pasto Studios, with Álvaro Villagra as the recording engineer again. This album was edited under their own record label: Yugular Records in 1997, after opening the show of Skid Row at Obras Sanitarias Stadium in Buenos Aires. That year, they performed more than 50 shows, published the CD and released a video home Biografía (Biography) with songs from both albums and EP. The following year, they released the videos along with photos from the Japan tour.

In 2000 Tren Loco released a new record: Carne Viva (Live Flesh) with arrangements on violin, accordion, and an interactive track. They presented this album for the first time at Cemento, as the main group. At this time, Mauricio Pregler decided to leave the band, and after the tryouts of several guitarists, Cristian Zombie Gauna joined Tren Loco as the leader guitar. They participated in Raza Metálica and La Cumbre del Metal festivals, and opened the Paul Di'Anno and Judas Priest's first show (with singer Tim "Ripper" Owens) in Argentina at Obras Sanitarias Stadium.

In 2001, they performed in the First National Metal Meeting of Argentina, in La Falda, Córdoba. The next year, they released a new album Ruta 197 (Route 197), which it was recorded once again at Del Abasto al Pasto studios with Álvaro Villagra.

In 2002, Tren Loco performed for the first time in Ecuador: in the cities Quito and Cuenca.

In 2003 they performed in Venezuela, at Teresa Carreño Theatre in Caracas. The following year, the band recorded the two parts of their live album Vivo… en la gran ciudad (Live... at the big city) at Hangar and República Cromañón clubs. Later on, they did the closure of La Cumbre del Metal festival.

In 2005, Tren Loco played for the first time at Cosquin Rock, in front of an audience of 5000 people. On March 26, they performed a show at CBGB in Buenos Aires and then did a live performance at FM Rock & Pop radio, on the program Cuál es?. After this, they toured around the northwest of Argentina.

During 2006, the band released their fifth record: Sangresur (Southern Blood) and the drummer Pollo Fuentes decided to leave the group. At this time, Daniel Dany Wolter took his place on the drums. In 2007, they performed for the third time in a row at Cosquin Rock festival and in Ecuador, in the city of Ambato. At this point, another change in the formation happened: they added a second guitar, being Facundo Coral the chosen one and for the first time in years Tren Loco played as a quintet in Montevideo, Uruguay and travelled across Argentina. In September of that year, they performed a show at Pepsi Music Festival in Buenos Aires.

In 2008, the band made their fourth appearance at Cosquin Rock festival, in front of 20000 attendees, On May 25, they presented at the Vive Latino Megafestival, in Mexico City. On June, they began the recording of their new CD in La Nave de Osberg studios, in Buenos Aires. Venas de Acero (Steel Veins) record features guest musicians like Andre Matos from Angra and Shaaman from Brazil and Oscar Sanchez from Lujuria, the Spanish band. On October 11, Tren Loco once again presented at Pepsi Music Festival, with Mötley Crüe and at the end of that year, they presented at Metal para todos (Metal for all) festival, which it took place at Colegiales Theatre. On December 13 Venas de Acero album was released under the label company Icarus Music.

In 2009, they shot the Pueblo Motoquero (Biker People) video and toured across Argentina. Then, the band performed for the fifth time at Cosquin Rock on the heavy metal stage. On May, they presented their latest record in Venezuela and continued for the rest of the year with the Venas de Acero Tour, performing more than 50 shows, including a motorcycle meeting: Motoencuentro Diamante.

Tren Loco celebrated their 20th anniversary in 2010 and performed again at Cosquin Rock, on a pouring day in front of 7000 people becoming an epic concert, powered by the audience. On March, they announced the publishing of their biographical book as part of the celebration; that it was released on September 18. The book is called Tren Loco. 20 años, Pogo en el andén (Tren Loco. 20 years, moshing on the train platform) and it also included the 20th Anniversary Cd with unreleased acoustic versions of their songs, and an interactive track with a documentary, photos, videos and audio files never published before. The Cd was edited once again by Yugular Records. On November 6, Tren Loco played at Colegiales Theatre in Buenos Aires and shot a DVD as a closure for the celebration.

In January 2011, they began their tour in Catamarca, in Tinogasta city and then performed one more time at Cosquin Rock. From March until July the band played in Córdoba, Paraná, Santa Fé (Argentina), Montevideo (Uruguay), Quito and Ambato (Ecuador), Bariloche, Tandil, Rosario, Río Gallegos and Pico Truncado (Argentina). On September, Tren Loco was invited to perform in the Whitesnake and Judas Priest's show at Presidente Perón Racing Club Stadium and the DVD Hoy es mejor que ayer (Today's better than yesterday) was released.

In 2012, they performed once again at Cosquin Rock with Anthrax and later, they began their Hoy es Mejor que Ayer tour all around Chaco, Formosa and Buenos Aires with Iced Earth. In March, the Latin American tour started in Caracas, Venezuela. Then, they continued in Córdoba, Santa Fé, the city of Bahía Blanca, Chubut, Río Negro, Mendoza and Montevideo. On October 6 they performed in front of 8000 people at Metal para todos festival at Malvinas Argentinas Stadium, in Buenos Aires.

In 2013, Tren Loco started to record a new album: Vieja Escuela (Old School) with Icarus Music. On February, and for the 10th time on a row, they played at Cosquin Rock Mega Festival.

In April 2014 Facundo Coral leaves the band for professional reasons.

In July 2014 Pablo G. Soler is announced as new member of Tren Loco.

== Band members ==
Current

- Daniel Medina – lead vocals (2022–present)
- Cristian "Zombie" Gauna – guitars (2001–present)
- Pablo G. Soler – guitars (2014–present)
- Sergio "Isopo" Rodríguez Wilson – bass (2022–present)
- Dany Wolter – drums (2007–present)

Past

- Carlos Cabral – lead vocals (1990–2021)
- Mauricio Pregler – guitars (1990–2000)
- Turco Atala – guitar (1990–1993)
- Facundo Coral – guitars (2007–2014)
- Gustavo Zavala – bass (1990–2022; his death)
- Pollo Fuentes – drums (1990–2006)

== Discography ==
- Tempestades - 1992
- No Me Importa! - 1996
- Carne Viva - 2000
- Ruta 197 - 2002
- Vivo... En la gran ciudad - 2004
- Vivo... En la gran ciudad 2 - 2005
- Sangresur - 2006
- Venas de Acero - 2008
- 20 Aniversario - 2010 (Acoustic CD, edited with the book Pogo en el Andén)
- Hoy es mejor que ayer - 2011 (Live DVD/CD)
- Vieja Escuela - 2013

=== Compilations and reissues ===
- Biografía - 1998
- Toda la historia - 2001
- Pampa del infierno - 2004
- Carne Viva '04 - 2004 (remastered reissue of Carne Viva)
- No Me Importa 2005 - 2005 (reissue of No Me Importa!)
- Colección Metal for Babies: Metal For Babies (2006, selected song: "Ella se mueve en silencio") y Metal For Babies II (2008, selected song: "Rostro Oscuro")

=== Participation in other albums ===
- Las mejores voces del metal - 1997
- Nuevos Guerreros 1998
- Nuevos Guerreros II - 1999
- Hermandad Metálica III - 2000
- Hermandad Metálica V - 2001
- Homenaje - 2002 (Hermética tribute disc, song:Gil Trabajador)
- Demolición de Bloke - 2002 (reissue and tribute, song: Identidad Real)
- Tributo a los reyes del metal - 2002 (several bands tribute disc, song: Crazy Train of Ozzy Osbourne)
- Mátenlos a todos - 2003 (Metallica tribute disc, song: For Whom The Bells Toll with Spanish lyrics)
- Hangar de Almas - 2005 (Megadeth tribute disc, song: Train Of Consequences with Spanish lyrics)
- Acero argentino - 2006 (Judas Priest tribute disc, song: The hellion-Electric eyes with Spanish lyrics)
- Que sea Rocka! - 2006 (Riff-Pappo tribute disc, song: Días buenos y días malos)
- Tributo internacional Kraken - 2007 (Kraken tribute disc, song: America)

== Bibliography ==
- "Tren Loco - Reseña". Heavy Metal Perú. 2011.
- Minore, Gito (2012). 20 años - Pogo en el andén. Buenos Aires, Argentina: Yugular Records.
