= Blasdead =

- Origin: Yokohama, Japan
- Genres: Speed metal, power metal, heavy metal
- Years active: 1990-present
- Labels: Black-listed, Lard
- Members: Shoji Yasuno; Kaoru "Hammy" Iihama; Kentaro Sasagawa; Daichi Hiroi
- Past members: Mitsuhiro Kondou; Masaru Azekura; Yoshiyuki Suzuki; Yoshio Enari; Tatsuya Takeyari; Jeff Rowe; Shuji Izaki; Chappy; Eiji Yokoyama; Minoru Itabashi; Takashi Satou; Takashi Yano
- Website: https://www.facebook.com/profile.php?id=61595560505598

Blasdead is a Japanese heavy metal band from Yokohama formed in 1990.

== History ==
Blasdead was formed in Yokohama in 1990. After a series of demo tapes, the band released its first album, Another Dimension, on Lard Records in 1996. Officially, the band has released four studio albums, the most recent being The Phoenix Never Dies, which was released in 2015 on Black-listed Records.

Since its formation, the guitarist Shoji Yasuno has been the only constant member.

== Members ==
=== Current members ===
- Shoji Yasuno - guitar (1990–present)
- Kentaro Sasagawa - bass guitar (2009–present)
- Kaoru "Hammy" Iihama - vocals (2012–present)
- Daichi Hiroi - drums (2025–present)

=== Past members ===
- Mitsuhiro Kondou - bass guitar (1990-1994)
- Masaru Azekura - drums (1990-1994)
- Yoshiyuki Suzuki - vocals (1990-1994)
- Yoshio Enari - bass guitar (1995-2007)
- Tatsuya Takeyari - drums (1995-2002)
- Jeff Rowe - vocals (1995-1996)
- Shuji Izaki - vocals (1998-1999, 2007-2011)
- Yasuyuki "Chappy" Kida - vocals (1999-2000)
- Eiji Yokoyama - vocals (2000-2007)
- Minoru Itabashi - bass guitar (2007-2009)
- Takashi Satou - guitar (2012-2016)
- Takashi Yano - drums (2002–2024, his death)

== Discography ==
- Demo 1992
- Demo 1993
- Try Your Faith (demo, 1995)
- Another Dimension (1996, Lard)
- Mechanical Civilization EP (2001, self-released)
- Ground Flare (2006, Black-listed)
- The Past and The Future (2010, Black-listed)
- The Phoenix Never Dies (2015, Black-listed)
