= Damien Thorne =

American heavy metal band

- Origin: Chicago, Illinois, U.S.
- Genres: Heavy metal; power metal; speed metal
- Years active: 1983–present

Damien Thorne is American heavy metal band formed in Chicago, Illinois in 1983.

== History ==
The band was formed in 1983 in Chicago, Illinois by guitarist Ken Mandat, and vocalist Justin Fate. The band's name was taken from a horror book The Omen. In 1984, the band recorded a demo called Sign of the Jackal, and after that in 1986 released an album with the same name. It was released on RoadRunner Records, and the band's own label called "Jackal Productions.

== Musical style ==
Damien Thorne's musical style has mainly been described as heavy metal, speed metal, and power metal. In an interview, guitarist, Ken Mandat replied as follows:

"I think I would say that if you like old school traditional Power Metal, then you would probably like us. Although, if you listen to all of our albums, you will hear many influences: Speed Metal/Power Metal, even some Progressive Metal as well."

== Band members ==
=== Current ===
- Warren Halverson – vocals
- Ken Mandat – guitar
- Mick Lucid – bass
- Kevin Tarpey – drums

=== Former ===
- Mike Browz – drums
- Rick Browz – bass
- Brian Buxbaum – keyboard
- Justin Fate - Vocals
- George Shelton - guitar
- Sean Ostes - guitar
- Matt Heuser - guitar
- Sanders Pate - bass
- Tom Dades - bass
- Jeff Mohr - guitar
- Tom Krez - drums
- Pete Pagonis - drums
- Michael Alvino - guitar
- Joe Martina - vocals
- Martin DeBourge
- Brian Horak

== Discography ==
- 1984 – Sign of the Jackal (Demo)
- 1986 – Sign of the Jackal (LP, Roadrunner Records)
- 2001 – Wrath of Darkness (LP, None)
- 2004 – Wrath of Darkness (Reissue, Criminal Records)
- 2005 – Haunted Mind (LP, Jackal Productions)
- 2011 – End of the Game (LP, None)
- 2015 – Soul Stealer (LP, None)
