= Servants of Chaos =

Compilation album by Cirith Ungol
- Released: September 5, 2001
- Genres: Heavy metal; doom metal; power metal
- Length: 2:25:15 (original release); 3:13:56 (with bonus disc)
- Label: Metal Blade

Cirith Ungol chronology
Paradise Lost (1991)	Servants of Chaos (2001)	Forever Black (2020)

Servants of Chaos is a compilation album by American heavy metal band Cirith Ungol, released under Metal Blade Records on September 5, 2001.

The album was released during the band's hiatus (which lasted from 1992–2016), and contains content from all four of their studio albums (Frost and Fire, King of the Dead, One Foot in Hell, and Paradise Lost), their 1979 self-titled demo, as well as previously unreleased live recordings of the band throughout the years. The original release of the album contains 31 tracks on two CDs.

The album was re-released on vinyl on November 21, 2011.

The album was re-released once again on January 31, 2012, with the addition of a bonus DVD-video of a live performance on November 9, 1984, at the Wolf & Rissmiller's Country Club—which was located in the Reseda neighborhood of Los Angeles.

The album was released for a fourth time by Metal Blade Records, digitally.

== Critical reception ==
Professional ratings
Review scores
Source	Rating
AllMusic	3.0/5 stars

The album received mostly positive reviews, with AllMusic giving it a critic score of 3/5 stars.

== Track listing ==
Disc 1
No.	Title	Length
1.	"Hype Performance"	2:25
2.	"Last Laugh"	4:13
3.	"Frost and Fire"	3:55
4.	"Eyes"	4:15
5.	"Better Off Dead"	4:59
6.	"100 MPH"	3:34
7.	"I'm Alive"	5:08
8.	"Bite of the Worm"	3:42
9.	"The Twitch" (instrumental)	2:21
10.	"Maybe That's Why" (instrumental)	6:30
11.	"Ill Met in Lankhmar" (instrumental)	5:58
12.	"Return to Lankhmar" (instrumental)	6:55
13.	"Darkness Weaves" (instrumental)	8:10
14.	"Witchdance" (instrumental)	1:19
15.	"Feeding the Ants" (instrumental)	2:09
16.	"Obsidian" (instrumental)	4:36

Disc 2
No.	Title	Length
17.	"Death of the Sun"	3:56
18.	"Fire" (Arthur Brown cover)	2:52
19.	"Fallen Idols"	6:34
20.	"Chaos Rising"	7:43
21.	"Fallen Idols"	6:29
22.	"Paradise Lost"	6:27
23.	"Join the Legion"	4:27
24.	"Before the Lash"	3:44
25.	"Atom Smasher" (live)	4:01
26.	"Master of the Pit" (live)	6:38
27.	"King of the Dead" (live)	6:58
28.	"Last Laugh" (live)	4:23
29.	"Cirith Ungol" (live)	8:21
30.	"Secret Agent Man" (Johnny Rivers cover)	3:12
31.	"Ferrari 308QV (on Dyno at 8000 RPM)" (instrumental)	0:23

Disc 3 (bonus DVD; 2011 and 2012 releases only)
No.	Title	Length
1.	"I'm Alive" (live)	4:41
2.	"Black Machine" (live)	4:14
3.	"Master of the Pit" (live)	6:06
4.	"King of the Dead" (live)	6:30
5.	"Death of the Sun" (live)	3:31
6.	"Finger of Scorn" (live)	7:31
7.	"Frost and Fire" (live)	3:21
8.	"Cirith Ungol" (live)	6:39
