= Liberate the Unborn Inhumanity =

Studio album by Mors Principium Est
- Released: 8 April 2022
- Recorded: 2021
- Genres: Symphonic metal, melodic death metal
- Length: 56:40
- Label: AFM Records
- Producer: Ville Viljanen

Mors Principium Est chronology
Seven (2020)	Liberate the Unborn Inhumanity (2022)	Darkness Invisible (2025)

Singles from Liberate the Unborn Inhumanity
- 1. "The Lust Called Knowledge" Released: 28 February 2022

Professional ratings
Review scores
Source	Rating
Blabbermouth.net	8/10
The Dark Melody	8.3/10
Ghost Cult Magazine	9/10

Liberate the Unborn Inhumanity is the eighth studio album by Finnish melodic death metal band Mors Principium Est, released on 8 April 2022 via AFM Records. It is a re-recording album consisting of new versions of songs from their earlier releases; Valley of Sacrifice (2001 demo), Inhumanity (2003), The Unborn (2005), and Liberation = Termination (2007). "The Lust Called Knowledge" was released as a single on the day of the album's announcement. It marks the return of guitarists Jori Haukio and Jarkko Kokko, replacing Andy Gillion who was fired from the band in 2021.

== Track listing ==
No.	Title	Lyrics	Music	Original album (year)	Length
1.	"Cleansing Rain"	Ville Viljanen, Jori Haukio	Haukio	Liberation = Termination (2007)	4:12
2.	"Eternity's Child"	Viljanen	Haukio	Inhumanity (2003)	5:05
3.	"The Unborn"	Viljanen	Haukio	The Unborn (2005)	3:48
4.	"The Lust Called Knowledge"	Viljanen	Haukio	Inhumanity (2003)	4:31
5.	"Valley of Sacrifice, Part 1"	Viljanen	Haukio	Valley of Sacrifice (2001)	6:07
6.	"Finality"	Viljanen	Haukio	Liberation = Termination (2007)	3:21
7.	"Two Steps Away"	Viljanen	Haukio	The Unborn (2005)	5:38
8.	"Inhumanity"	Viljanen, Haukio	Haukio	Inhumanity (2003)	2:48
9.	"Pure"	Viljanen, Haukio, Jarkko Kokko	Haukio	The Unborn (2005)	6:12
10.	"The Animal Within"	Viljanen	Haukio	Liberation = Termination (2007)	3:16
11.	"Life in Black"	Viljanen, Haukio	Haukio	Inhumanity (2003)	3:40
12.	"Fragile Flesh"	Viljanen, Kokko	Kokko	The Unborn (2005)	4:02
13.	"Valley of Sacrifice, Part 2"	Viljanen, Kokko	Haukio	Valley of Sacrifice (2001)	5:38
Total length:					56:40

== Credits ==
=== Musicians ===
- Ville Viljanen – vocals
- Jarkko Kokko – guitars
- Jori Haukio – guitars, programming
- Teemu Heinola – bass
- Marko Tommila – drums

=== Guests ===
- Sara Lindroos – female vocals on "Pure"

=== Production ===
- Thomas 'Plec' Johansson – mixing, mastering
- Teemu Heinola – recording (bass, drums, vocals)
- Jarkko Kokko – recording (guitars, programming)
- Jori Haukio – recording (guitars, programming)
- Jan Yrlund – artwork, layout
