= The Son of Odin =

Studio album by Elixir
- Released: June 1986
- Recorded: The Lodge, Clare, Suffolk, England
- Genre: Heavy metal
- Length: 40:28
- Label: Elixir Records
- Producer: Elixir

Elixir chronology
The Son of Odin (1986)	Lethal Potion (1990)

Professional ratings
Review scores
Source	Rating
AllMusic	4/5 stars
Collector's Guide to Heavy Metal	6/10
Kerrang!	4/5 stars

The Son of Odin is the debut album of British heavy metal band Elixir, released in 1986 on 12" vinyl. Cult Metal Classics re-released the album on CD in 2001. The album also included 3 bonus tracks. The album was also released on CD by TPL records in 2004, Majestic Rock in 2006 and CTR in 2011 as a 25th Anniversary Edition. In issue 137 (November 2005) of Terrorizer magazine, the album was included in the top 25 power metal albums of all time, alongside Judas Priest's Painkiller, Helloween's Keeper of the Seven Keys: Part II and Cirith Ungol's King of the Dead. In 2019, Metal Hammer ranked it as the 21st best power metal album of all time.

== Track listing ==
Side one
No.	Title	Writer(s)	Length
1.	"The Star of Beshaan"	Kevin Dobbs, Norman Gordon, Paul Taylor, Phil Denton	5:30
2.	"Pandora's Box"	K. Dobbs, Nigel Dobbs, Gordon, Taylor, Denton	4:35
3.	"Hold High the Flame"	Gordon, Taylor, Denton	3:53
4.	"Children of Tomorrow"	Denton	4:53

Side two
No.	Title	Writer(s)	Length
5.	"Trial by Fire"	Denton	3:53
6.	"Starflight"	Gordon, Taylor, Denton	3:55
7.	"Dead Man's Gold"	Taylor, Denton	4:21
8.	"Treachery"	Gordon, Taylor, Denton	3:30
9.	"The Son of Odin"	Gordon, Taylor, Denton	5:58

CD bonus tracks (Cult Metal Classics)
No.	Title	Length
10.	"Chariot of the Gods"	2:31
11.	"Winds of Time" (originally released as a B-side for the "Treachery" single)	5:10
12.	"Treachery (live)"	4:39

CD bonus tracks (TPL and Majestic Rock)
No.	Title	Length
4.	"Chariot of the Gods"	2:31

CD bonus tracks (25th Anniversary Edition)
No.	Title	Length
10.	"Chariot of the Gods"	2:31
11.	"Winds of Time" (originally released as a B-side for the "Treachery" single)	5:10
12.	"The Star of Beshaan" (Recorded for BBC Friday Rock Show session.)	5:24
13.	"Pandora's Box" (Recorded for BBC Friday Rock Show session.)	4:36
14.	"Hold High the Flame" (Recorded for BBC Friday Rock Show session.)	4:04
15.	"The Son of Odin" (Recorded for BBC Friday Rock Show session.)	5:53

== Personnel ==
Elixir

- Paul Taylor – vocals, keyboards on track 7
- Phil Denton – guitar, keyboards on track 7
- Norman Gordon – guitar
- Kevin Dobbs – bass
- Nigel Dobbs – drums

Production

- Martin Stansfield – engineer
