= Crystal Viper =

Polish heavy metal band

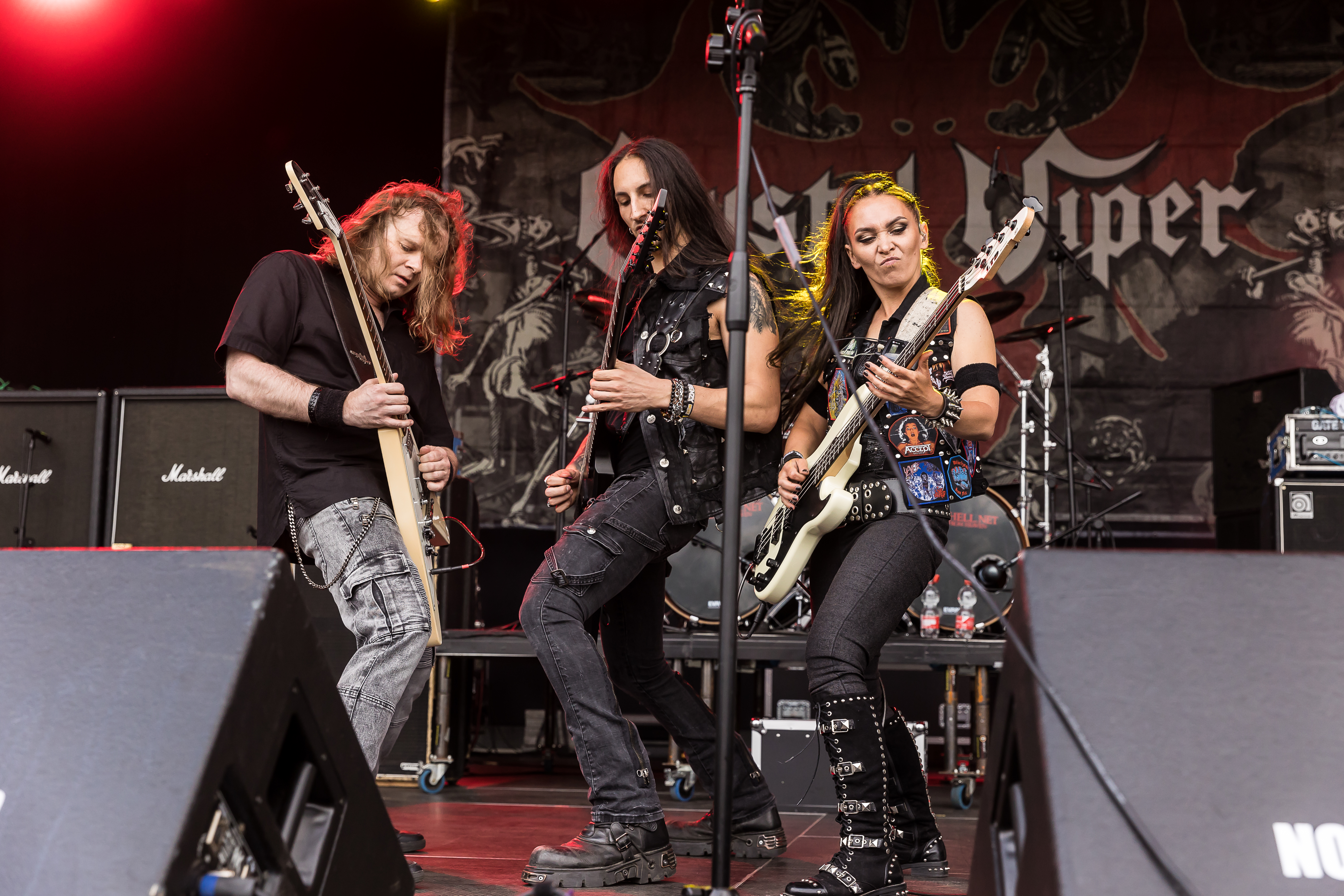
- Crystal Viper at the Metal Frenzy Open Air 2024 in Gardelegen, Germany

Background information
- Origin: Katowice, Poland
- Genres: Heavy metal, power metal, speed metal
- Years active: 2003–2025
- Label: Listenable Records
- Past members: Marta Gabriel; Andy Wave; Tomasz Dańczak; Vicky Vick; Tomasz Targosz; Tomasz Woryna; Michal Badocha; Błażej Grygiel; Eric Juris; Cederick Forsberg; Kuba Galwas; Giuseppe Taormina

Crystal Viper was a Polish heavy metal band founded in 2003 by singer and guitarist Marta Gabriel.

== History ==
Crystal Viper was formed in the city of Katowice, Poland, by singer and guitarist Marta Gabriel (who was using the stage name "Leather Wych" at the time) and her husband Bart Gabriel, manager and producer. Their first recorded song was "Wild Child", a cover of W.A.S.P., made for the tribute album "A Tribute To W.A.S.P.". In 2005 they recorded "Chaos Rising" of Cirith Ungol for another tribute album, "One Foot In Fire - A Tribute To Cirith Ungol". The song had the collaboration of a pair of members of the British band Elixir. The first stable line-up from 2007 was Leather Wych on vocals, Lukasz "Andy Wave" Halczuch on the guitar, Tomek "Golem" Danczak on the drums, and Tommy Targosz on the bass. They recorded more songs for tribute albums, Manilla Road's "Flaming Metal Systems" for the album "A Tribute To Manilla Road", Angel Witch's "Atlantis" for "Unbroken Metal Tribute to Angelwitch", and Warlock's "Mr. Gold" for "A Tribute to Warlock". They also played at the festivals Masters Of Rock, Noc Plna Hvezd, and Basinfire Fest in the Czech Republic. After this, they signed a deal with the German label Karthago Records.

Their debut concept album The Curse Of Crystal Viper was released in early 2007, and followed by The Last Axeman compilation in 2008. Their second studio album Metal Nation was released in 2009. The album would be the first to feature the new bassist Tomasz Woryna, and was co-produced by the King Diamond guitarist Andy LaRocque. Between 2006 and 2009, Crystal Viper was a four-piece band in the studio and a five-piece band on stage, featuring different musicians at the position of the live rhythm guitarist, until Gabriel took over the duties of a rhythm guitarist as well. Since then, Crystal Viper played as a four-piece act both in the studio and on stage.

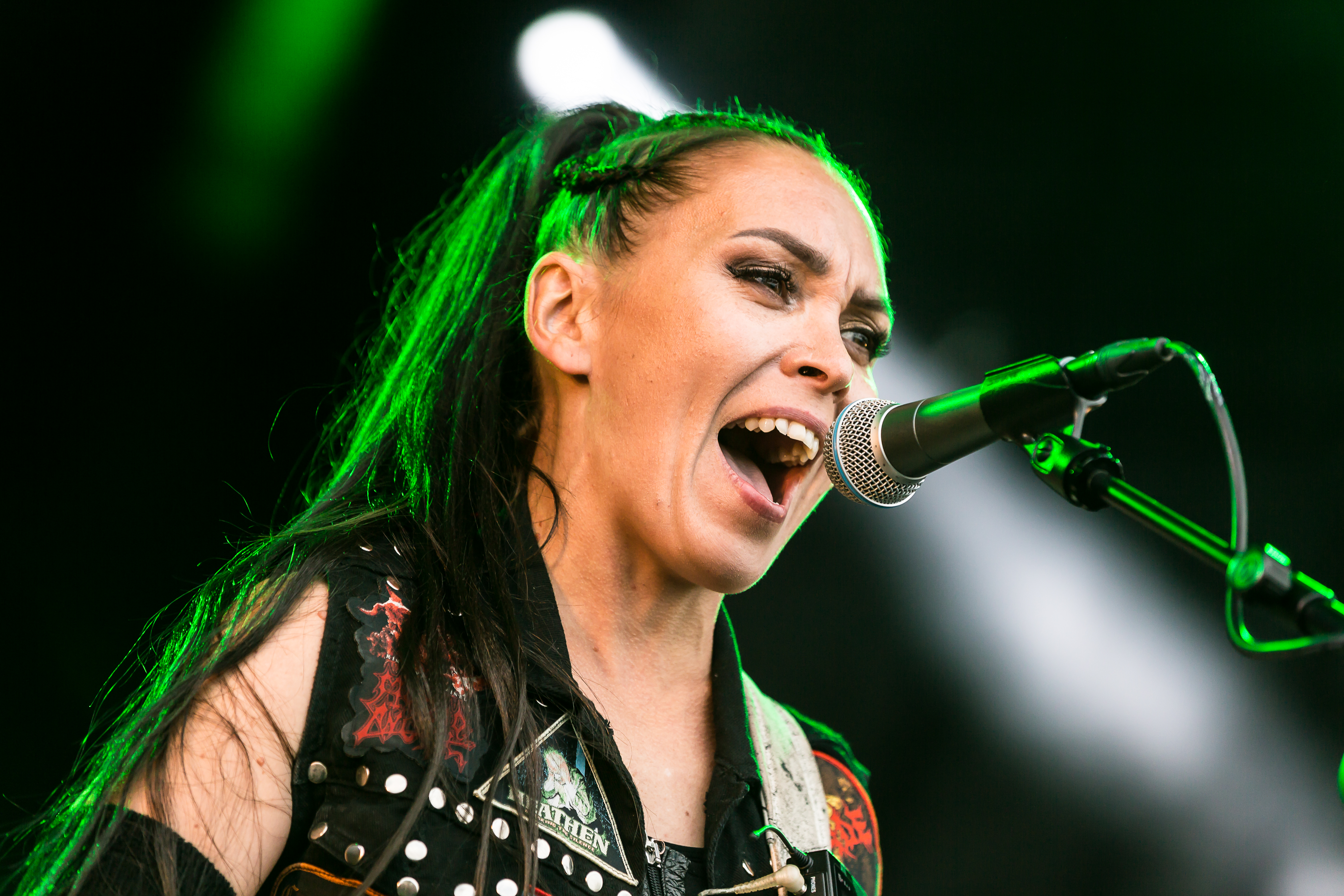
Marta Gabriel, leader of the band

In 2009, Crystal Viper signed a multiple record deal with AFM Records. They recorded their third studio album Legends for release in 2010. The album featured lyrics based on old Polish legends and stories. In 2012, it was followed by Crimen Excepta, a concept effort about witches and the Holy Inquisition. Due to occupational obligations, Woryna was forced to take a lesser part in the band's activity, and most of the bass parts on Crimen Excepta were recorded by Gabriel. The band did not cease touring, so Michal Badocha stepped in as the new bass player.

After several live shows around Europe in 2013, Crystal Viper returned to the studio to record the fifth studio album, Possession. The album has collaborations of Harry Conklin from Jag Panzer, Sataniac from Desaster, and some chorus were made by fans of the band. Soon after its premiere, due to health issues relating to the band's front woman and founder Gabriel, the band suspended all activities. It was unclear for a time if the band would continue. In late 2016, the band announced their return. The comeback album Queen of the Witches was released after a four-year silence, in February 2017. Like all the previous albums, it was produced by Bart Gabriel (known for his collaboration with acts such as Cirith Ungol, Pagan Altar, Hexx and Sacred Steel). The cover artwork was done by German artist Andreas Marschall, who is known for artworks he made for big-name metal acts such as Running Wild, Blind Guardian and Kreator. Queen of the Witches is also the first Crystal Viper album recorded with the new bass player, Blaze J. Grygiel. The band invited several special guests to partake in the recordings. This included recording two cover songs for the CD and the LP version of the album respectively. Manowar co-founding guitarist Ross the Boss guested on "Do Or Die", while Mantas of Venom played a guitar solo on "Flames And Blood". On the power ballad "We Will Make It Last Forever", Marta Gabriel shares vocal duties with Steve Bettney, vocalist of the NWOBHM cult act Saracen. The album was promoted with two video clips, and a European tour in March–April 2017, during which the band visited Belgium, France, Germany, Austria, Switzerland, Hungary, Czech Republic, and Poland.

On 4 June 2018, rhythm guitarist Eric Juris joined the band. On 16 November 2021, drummer Ced departed the band due to personal problems. He was replaced by Kuba Galwas on 20 June 2022.

On 13 March 2024, the band announced their ninth album, The Silver Key, which was released on 28 June. The lyrics talk about Lovecraftian horror, like in the previous album The Cult, and had the working title of The Cult II. It was promoted with The Silver Key Tour 2024, alongside Savage Master. Andy suffered a hand injury in March 2025, forcing the band to cancel some concerts. For the arranged concerts with Riot V, Marta switched to rhythm guitar, and Blaze returned to the band to handle bass duties. The band also recorded tracks for a live album at Poland, Germany, Austria, Denmark, Italy, France, Belgium and Czech Republic for the upcoming live album, The Live Quest, which was released on 27 June 2025. The first single of the live album is "The Cult", recorded live at the Keep It True Festival 2024.

On 28 August 2025, Crystal Viper announced their disbandment. In March 2026, Gabriel formed a new band, Leatherwitch (a nod to her stage name used when Crystal Viper first formed).

== Band members ==
=== Final lineup ===
- Marta Gabriel – vocals (2003–2025), bass (2023–2025), guitars (2009–2023)
- Andy Wave – guitars (2006–2025)
- Kuba Galwas – drums (2022–2025)
- Giuseppe "Tiyris" Taormina – guitars (2024–2025)

=== Former ===
- Tomasz "Golem" Dańczak – drums (2006–2019)
- Vicky Vick – rhythm guitar (2006–2008)
- Tomasz Targosz – bass (2006–2008)
- Tomasz Woryna – bass (2008–2013)
- Michal Badocha – bass (2013–2016)
- Błażej "Blaze" Grygiel – bass (2016–2023)
- Eric Juris – guitars (2018–2024)
- Cederick "Ced" Forsberg – drums (2019–2021)

== Discography ==
=== Albums ===
- The Curse of Crystal Viper (2007)
- Metal Nation (2009)
- Legends (2010)
- Crimen Excepta (2012)
- Possession (2013)
- Queen of the Witches (2017)
- Tales of Fire and Ice (2019)
- The Cult (2021)
- The Silver Key (2024)

=== EPs ===
- At the Edge of Time (2018)
- The Last Axeman (2022)

=== Compilation ===
- The Last Axeman (2008)
- Sleeping Swords (2009)

=== Live albums ===
- Defenders of the Magic Circle: Live in Germany (2010)
- The Live Quest (2025)

=== Singles ===
- "The Wolf and the Witch" (2009)
- "Stronghold" (2009)
- "Witch's Mark" (2012)
- "Fight Evil with Evil" (2013)
- "The Witch Is Back" (2016)
- "Still Alive" (2019)
- "Bright Lights" (2019)
- "The Cult" (2020)

=== Demos ===
- Rehearsal Tape (2003)
- Live Demo (2004)
- Strike One (2005)
- The Soundhouse Tape (2005)
