= Elixir (British band) =

British heavy metal band

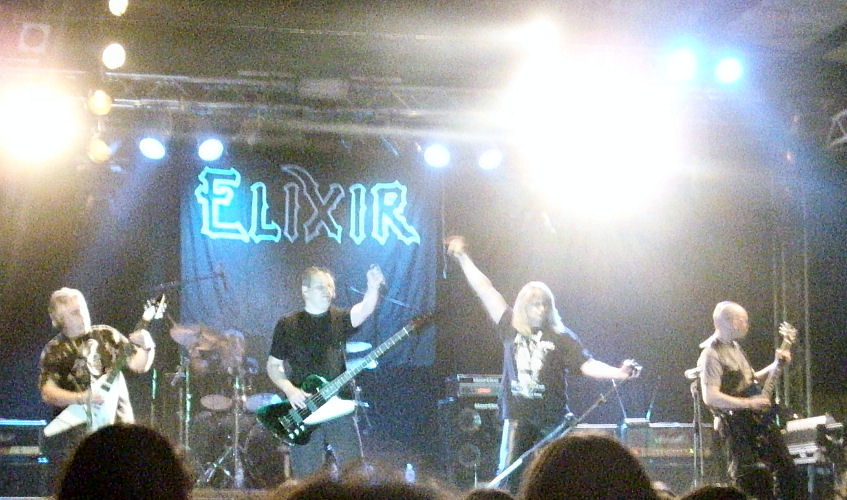
- Elixir live in 2010

Background information
- Origin: England
- Genres: Heavy metal
- Years active: 1983–present
- Label: Dissonance Productions / Back On Black
- Members: Paul Taylor; Norman Gordon; Nigel Dobbs; Mark Mulcaster; Vinny Konrad
- Past members: Phil Denton; Steve Bentley; Sally Pike; Mark White; Clive Burr; Stevie Hughes; Leon Lawson; Kevin Dobbs
- Website: http://www.coldtown.com/elixir

Elixir is a British heavy metal band, formed by Steve Bentley, Kevin Dobbs, Nigel Dobbs and Phil Denton in November 1983. They are notable for being associated with the new wave of British heavy metal movement.

== History ==
=== 1983-1990 ===
The band spent the first time after having formed writing material and rehearsing. After brief stints as "Purgatory" and "Hellfire" the members finally decided on naming the band "Elixir". According to the biography on the band's website the name was chosen through Steve Bentley closing his eyes, and putting his finger on a word in a dictionary at random. In need of a vocalist Elixir recruited singer Sally Pike, but after recording a four song demo tape and playing two gigs together, she left the band by the end of the year. In 1984, Pike was replaced by Paul Taylor, and later the same year guitarist Norman Gordon joined the band to fill the vacant spot left by Steve Bentley, who departed after Elixir had completed their second demo tape.

In 1985, Elixir released their debut single "Treachery (Ride like the Wind)" / "Winds of Time". This single was reviewed by Ronnie James Dio in Kerrang! (No 99), and was given the thumbs up.

In 1986, the band recorded their first album The Son of Odin. In issue 137 (November 2005) of Terrorizer magazine, the album was included in the top 20 power metal albums of all time, alongside Judas Priest's Painkiller, Helloween's Keeper of the Seven Keys: Part II and Cirith Ungol's King of the Dead.

Elixir recorded their second album, initially called Sovereign Remedy in 1988 with Mark White on the bass and former Iron Maiden drummer Clive Burr. Stevie Hughes replaced Burr for the band's live commitments through 1989. At the end of the year, Phil Denton quit the band and was replaced by Leon Lawson for several live shows before the band came off the road. Their second album was released by the Sonic label as Lethal Potion in 1990. In 2004, the album was re-released as Sovereign Remedy on the TPL label, as it was originally intended, with all the tracks, the original mix and new artwork.

=== 2001–2012 ===
In 2001 the band reverted to the Paul Taylor, Phil Denton, Norman Gordon, Kevin Dobbs and Nigel Dobbs line up and, in 2003, recorded their third album The Idol, which was made up of material the band had written in the 1980s. With rising popularity, the band toured around various countries such as Greece, Germany and the United States.

Elixir recorded their fourth album Mindcreeper in 2006, which was released by Majestic Rock.

Elixir released the album All Hallows Eve on 31 October 2010 on their own CTR label.

Between 2006 and 2012, Elixir organised six editions of the "British Steel Festival", appearing on the bill at each event. From 2008 onwards, the festival was held at the Camden Underworld.

Elixir disbanded in 2012, with members Paul Taylor and Phil Denton going on to form the metal/rock band, Midnight Messiah.

Clive Burr died a year later, due to complications related to MS.

=== 2018–present ===
After writing new material in 2018, guitarist Phil Denton approached the other members of the band with a view to recording a new album. Paul Taylor, Norman Gordon, and Nigel Dobbs all agreed to re-form the band, but bassist Kevin Dobbs did not wish to be involved in the project. The resulting album, Voyage of the Eagle, was released in 2020 with Luke Fabian on bass.

On 7 March 2020 Elixir performed at Burr Fest, a charity gig in London, in aid of MS sufferers in memory of Clive Burr. Kevin Dobbs performed at Burr Fest as a farewell gig with the band before being replaced by Mark Mulcaster.

On 15 June 2024 Phil Denton announced his retirement from Elixir. After a lengthy search, on 2 March 2025 the band recruited Vinny Konrad, known for playing in Pagan Altar and Thunderstick, to take over the position.

== Members ==
=== Current ===
- Nigel Dobbs – drums (1983–1987, 2001–2012, 2019–present)
- Paul Taylor – vocals (1984–1990, 2001–2012, 2019–present)
- Norman Gordon – guitar (1984–1990, 2001–2012, 2019–present)
- Mark Mulcaster – bass (2020–present)
- Vinny Konrad – guitar (2025–present)

=== Past ===
- Phil Denton – guitar (1983–1989, 2001–2012, 2019–2024)
- Kevin Dobbs – bass (1983–1987, 2001–2012, 2019–2020)
- Sally Pike – vocals (1983)
- Steve Bentley – guitar (1983–1984)
- Mark White – bass (1987–1990)
- Clive Burr – drums (1988; died 2013)
- Stevie Hughes – drums (1989–1990)
- Leon Lawson – guitar (1989)
- Luke Fabian – bass (2019–2020)

Timeline

== Discography ==
=== Studio albums ===
- The Son of Odin (1986)
- Lethal Potion (1990)
- The Idol (2003)
- Mindcreeper (2006)
- All Hallows Eve (2010)
- Voyage Of The Eagle (2020)

=== Live albums ===
- Elixir Live (2006)

=== Singles ===
- "Treachery" (1985)
- "Knocking on the Gates of Hell" (2006)

=== Alternative versions ===
- "Sovereign Remedy" (2004)

== See also ==
- List of new wave of British heavy metal bands
