= God Is an Automaton =

Studio album by Sybreed
- Released: 24 September 2012
- Recorded: December 2011 – May 2012
- Genres: Industrial metal; cyber metal
- Length: 59:38
- Label: Listenable
- Producer: Thomas "Drop" Betrisey

Sybreed chronology
The Pulse of Awakening (2009)	God Is an Automaton (2012)	Bonus Tracks (2025)

Professional ratings
Review scores
Source	Rating
AllMusic	3.5/5 stars
Blabbermouth.net	7.5/10
Blistering	7.5/10
Metal Hammer	2/5 stars

God Is an Automaton is the fourth studio album by Swiss industrial metal band Sybreed. It was released on 24 September 2012 in Europe and 2 October 2012 in North America under Listenable Records. Recordings began in December 2011 and were completed in May 2012. This is their last album before splitting up from 2014 to 2025.

== Track listing ==
All lyrics are written by Benjamin Nominet; all music is composed by Thomas "Drop" Betrisey.

God Is an Automaton track listing
No.	Title	Length
1.	"Posthuman Manifesto"	4:49
2.	"No Wisdom Brings Solace"	4:37
3.	"The Line of Least Resistance"	4:32
4.	"Red Nova Ignition"	5:08
5.	"God Is an Automaton"	5:59
6.	"Hightech Versus Lowlife"	5:15
7.	"Downfall Inc."	5:00
8.	"Challenger"	4:36
9.	"A Radiant Daybreak"	5:30
10.	"Into the Blackest Light"	4:28
11.	"Destruction and Bliss"	9:44
Total length:		59:38

2025 reissue bonus track
No.	Title	Length
12.	"Hardboiled Venus"	4:37
Total length:		64:15

== Personnel ==
Sybreed

- Benjamin Nominet – vocals
- Thomas "Drop" Betrisey – guitars, electronics
- Ales Campanelli – bass
- Kevin Choiral – drums, percussion

Additional

- Rhys Fulber – keyboards, mixing, arrangements
- Seth Siro Anton – cover art
- Travis Montgomery – guitar solo on "Destruction and Bliss"
