= Seven (Mors Principium Est album) =

Studio album by Mors Principium Est
- Released: 21 October 2020
- Recorded: 2019–2020
- Genres: Symphonic metal, melodic death metal
- Length: 48:06
- Label: AFM Records
- Producers: Andy Gillion; Ville Viljanen

Mors Principium Est chronology
Embers of a Dying World (2017)	Seven (2020)	Liberate the Unborn Inhumanity (2022)

Singles from Seven
- 1. "A Day for Redemption" Released: 17 August 2020; 2. "My Home, My Grave" Released: 8 October 2020

Professional ratings
Review scores
Source	Rating
Dead Rhetoric	8/10
Eternal Terror	5/6
Heavymetal.dk	8/10

Seven is the seventh studio album by Finnish melodic death metal band Mors Principium Est. It was released on 21 October 2020 via AFM Records. It is the band's last album with guitarist Andy Gillion. At the same time as Gillion's departure, bassist Teemu Heinola would make his return after being absent from recording bass for this album, and session drummer Marko Tommila would become a full-time member.

== Track listing ==
No.	Title	Length
1.	"A Day for Redemption"	5:03
2.	"Lost in a Starless Aeon"	5:05
3.	"In Frozen Fields"	5:07
4.	"March to War"	4:58
5.	"Rebirth"	3:30
6.	"Reverence" (instrumental)	2:00
7.	"Master of the Dead"	6:38
8.	"The Everlong Night"	4:16
9.	"At the Shores of Silver Sand"	5:09
10.	"My Home, My Grave"	6:20
11.	"Uprising" (Muse cover) (Japanese bonus track)	4:01
Total length:		52:07

== Credits ==
=== Musicians ===
- Ville Viljanen – vocals
- Andy Gillion – guitars, bass, programming
- Marko Tommila – drums

=== Production ===
- Thomas 'Plec' Johansson – mixing, mastering
- Teemu Heinola – recording (drums, vocals)
- Andy Gillion – recording (guitars, bass)
- Jan Yrlund – artwork, layout
