= Symbyosis =

- Origin: France
- Genres: Progressive metal Death metal
- Years active: 1999–present
- Label: Listenable Records
- Members: Franck Kobolt; Corrosive Bob; Nikos Kevorkian; Antoine Rognon; Tariq Zulficar
- Website: www.symbyosis.com

Symbyosis is a French progressive death metal band, founded by Franck Kobolt and Corrosive Bob.

== History ==
The foundations of what was to become Symbyosis were laid in 1998 when Franck Kobolt began to compose songs for a personal project called Chrysalid. At first, four songs only were written as they were for his sole benefit, not to be released for a larger audience. Nevertheless, in the following months, Franck Kobolt united with another composer PhilQuist and the singer Corrosive Bob which led to the writing of more music and texts. After a whole year, what had begun as a four-title demo finally turned into a full album.

In June 1999, the band began a studio session to record its first true album, Crisis, under the aegis of Hidden Association and finished the recording in January 2000. This album is made of thirteen titles and friends of the group participated like Oslanon Gerom, Cryopsis Entity on additional voices as well as Karl Bourdin on guitar solos. Cryopsis Entity also wrote the lyrics of some songs and PhilQuist co-composed others. One song taken from this album Crisis; the Quest of the Dolphin, was chosen in March 2000 to be released on a compilation for Metallian magazine. Finally, the band signed with Listenable Records in July 2000.

In October 2000, Symbyosis released its mini-album The Fluid and revealed its work Crisis in November 2000. Then in 2001, the group went on tour with No Return and Crest of Darkness with Tariq Zulficar playing drums and Antoine Rognon, bass guitar and Nikos Kevorkian as second guitar. That same year, the title “Voyager” was on free download on the band's website as a thank-you present to fans for their support and Symbyosis came 7th best album and 4th best new group in the Hardandheavy (French metal magazine) readers’ referendum.

Symbyosis fate changed in September 2001 as Listenable Records did not renew its contract with the group. So in January 2002, Symbyosis launched a new demo still with Tariq, Antoine and Nikos, “Life is a phoenix” in order to find a new label to sign with. But to no end, so that the band decided to produce and release its next album on its own. As technical and human problems piled up on those linked with the production of the album, the band's finances plummeted. Symbyosis was then in a very difficult situation but driven by the support of their families and friends and of some media, the group managed to pull through selling the album on subscription to fans worldwide. This subscription enabled the band to close the necessary budget to the making of the album.

About five years after Crisis the new Symbiosis studio album was released, being in the end distributed by Listenable Records / Pias. “On the wings of Phoenix” was recorded both in Adima Studio (Paris) and Hidden Association Studios (St Cloud - France) and was out in December 2005. It is a double-album with 24 titles which show the band's musical diversity; this was also the opportunity for the band to make references to some of theirs inspirations such as Slayer, Iron Maiden or even pay strong tribute to Napalm Death.

== Current line-up ==
- Franck Kobolt - Guitar
- Corrosive Bob - Lead Vocals
- Nikos Kevorkian - Guitar
- Antoine Rognon - Bass
- Tariq Zulficar - Drums

== Discography ==
- 2000 : The Fluid (Mini-LP)
- 2000 : Crisis (LP)
- 2001 : Voyager (Single)
- 2002 : Life is a Phoenix (Promo Demo)
- 2005 : On the Wings of Phoenix (Full-length 2CDs)
