= The Pulse of Awakening =

Studio album by Sybreed
- Released: 23 November 2009
- Recorded: 2009
- Studios: The Drone, Geneva, Switzerland; S. D. F. Studio, Lausanne, Switzerland
- Genres: Industrial metal; cyber metal; groove metal
- Length: 72:48
- Label: Listenable
- Producer: Thomas "Drop" Betrisey

Sybreed chronology
| Antares (2007) | The Pulse of Awakening (2009) | God Is an Automaton (2012) |

Professional ratings
Review scores
| Source | Rating |
|---|---|
| PopMatters | 6/10 |
| Soundsphere | 3/5 |

The Pulse of Awakening is the third album by Swiss industrial metal band Sybreed. It was released in 2009 under Listenable Records. Vocalist Benjamin Nominet has stated that the album title was inspired by the cyberpunk anime television series Ergo Proxy.

In April 2025, the band announced that Antares, The Pulse of Awakening, and God Is an Automaton would all be reissued on CD and vinyl, all set to be released on 30 May through Listenable. That same day, the band released a cover of the Tears for Fears song "Shout" that will appear on the reissue for The Pulse of Awakening.

== Track listing ==
All tracks are written by Benjamin Nominet and Thomas “Drop” Betrisey, except where noted.

The Pulse of Awakening track listing
| No. | Title | Writer(s) | Length |
|---|---|---|---|
| 1. | "Nomenklatura" | | 4:49 |
| 2. | "A.E.O.N" | | 5:03 |
| 3. | "Doomsday Party" | | 4:19 |
| 4. | "Human Black Box" | | 5:08 |
| 5. | "KillJoy" | | 4:50 |
| 6. | "I Am Ultraviolence" | | 4:03 |
| 7. | "Electronegative" | | 4:40 |
| 8. | "In the Cold Light" | | 3:16 |
| 9. | "Lucifer Effect" | | 6:36 |
| 10. | "Love Like Blood" (Killing Joke cover) | Jaz Coleman, Paul Ferguson, Geordie Walker, Paul Raven | 4:46 |
| 11. | "Meridian A.D." | | 5:59 |
| 12. | "From Zero to Nothing" | Nominet, Betrisey, Alexandre Deschaumes | 19:19 (Note: Shortened to 9:52 on some editions) |
| Total length: | | | 72:48 |

The Pulse of Awakening Reissue (2025)
| No. | Title | Writer(s) | Length |
|---|---|---|---|
| 1. | "Nomenklatura" | | 4:49 |
| 2. | "A.E.O.N" | | 5:03 |
| 3. | "Doomsday Party" | | 4:19 |
| 4. | "Human Black Box" | | 5:08 |
| 5. | "KillJoy" | | 4:50 |
| 6. | "I Am Ultraviolence" | | 4:03 |
| 7. | "Electronegative" | | 4:40 |
| 8. | "In the Cold Light" | | 3:16 |
| 9. | "Lucifer Effect" | | 6:36 |
| 10. | "Love Like Blood" (Killing Joke cover) | Coleman, Ferguson, Walker, Raven | 4:46 |
| 11. | "Meridian A.D." | | 5:59 |
| 12. | "Flesh Doll for Sale" | | 5:01 |
| 13. | "From Zero to Nothing" | Nominet, Betrisey, Deschaumes | 9:52 |
| 14. | "Shout" (Tears for Fears cover) | Roland Orzabal, Ian Stanley | 5:02 |
| Total length: | | | 73:24 |

== Personnel ==
Sybreed

- Benjamin Nominet – vocals, orchestral arrangements (tracks 6, 9, 12)
- Thomas "Drop" Betrisey – guitars, electronics
- Ales Campanelli – bass
- Kevin Choiral – drums, percussion

Additional

- Rhys Fulber – keyboards, mixing, arrangements
- Alexandre Deschaumes – guitar solo on "From Zero to Nothing"
- Naïche Barbaglia – mastering
- Seth Siro Anton – cover art
- Fabien Welfring – photography
