= Antares (Sybreed album) =

Studio album by Sybreed
- Released: 25 October 2007
- Recorded: 2006–2007
- Studios: The Drone, Geneva, Switzerland; Taurus Studios, Geneva, Switzerland
- Genres: Industrial metal; cyber metal; melodic death metal
- Length: 56:56
- Label: Listenable
- Producer: Thomas "Drop" Betrisey

Sybreed chronology
Slave Design (2004)	Antares (2007)	The Pulse of Awakening (2009)

Professional ratings
Review scores
Source	Rating
Heavymetal.dk	8/10
Imperiumi.net	7/10
Metal.de	7/10

Antares is the second album by Swiss industrial metal band Sybreed. It was released on 25 October 2007 in Europe under Listenable Records, and on 15 August 2008 in the U.S. under Koch Records. Dirk Verbeuren was hired as a session musician in April 2006 to record the drums for the album.

Antares has received positive reviews from critics. Sybreed gained some minor mainstream exposure in December 2012 when Rachel Aspe performed the album's first track "Emma-0" on the French talent show La France a un incroyable talent.

== Track listing ==
All lyrics are written by Benjamin Nominet; all music is composed by Thomas "Drop" Betrisey.

Antares track listing
No.	Title	Length
1.	"Emma-0"	4:27
2.	"Ego Bypass Generator"	4:55
3.	"Revive My Wounds"	4:19
4.	"Isolate"	5:17
5.	"Dynamic"	5:39
6.	"Neurodrive"	4:09
7.	"Ex-Inferis"	2:04
8.	"Permafrost"	5:05
9.	"Orbital"	5:55
10.	"Twelve Megatons Gravity"	5:46
11.	"Ethernity"	9:20
Total length:		56:56

Antares 2025 reissue track listing
No.	Title	Length
1.	"Emma-0"	4:27
2.	"Ego Bypass Generator"	4:55
3.	"Revive My Wounds"	4:19
4.	"Isolate"	5:17
5.	"Dynamic"	5:39
6.	"Neurodrive"	4:09
7.	"Ex-Inferis"	2:04
8.	"Permafrost"	5:05
9.	"Orbital"	5:55
10.	"Twelve Megatons Gravity"	5:46
11.	"Technocracy"	5:14
12.	"Plasmaterial"	6:26
13.	"Ethernity"	9:20
Total length:		68:36

== Personnel ==
Sybreed

- Benjamin Nominet – vocals
- Thomas "Drop" Betrisey – guitars, electronics, producer, mixing
- Luis "Burn" Da Silva Cruz – bass

Session musicians

- Dirk Verbeuren – drums, percussion

Additional

- Johann Vergères – mixing
- Stéphane Loup – mixing
- Naïche Barbaglia – mastering
- Svencho – artwork
