= The Unborn (album) =

Studio album by Mors Principium Est
- Released: April 18, 2005
- Recorded: October–November 2004
- Studio: Tico-Tico Studio, Kemi, Finland, and Jori Haukio's home studio
- Genre: Melodic death metal
- Length: 58:17
- Label: Listenable
- Producer: Jori Haukio; Mors Principium Est

Mors Principium Est chronology
Inhumanity (2003)	The Unborn (2005)	Liberation = Termination (2007)

The Unborn is the second studio album by Finnish melodic death metal band Mors Principium Est. A limited edition digipak version was also released, with two bonus tracks.

== Track listing ==
No.	Title	Lyrics	Music	Length
1.	"Pure"	Jori Haukio, Ville Viljanen, Jarkko Kokko	Haukio	6:08
2.	"The Harmony Remains"	Viljanen, Kokko	Haukio	4:51
3.	"Parasites of Paradise"	Viljanen, Kokko	Haukio	4:19
4.	"Two Steps Away"	Viljanen	Haukio	5:44
5.	"Altered State of Consciousness"	Viljanen	Haukio	4:20
6.	"Spirit-Conception"	(instrumental)	Haukio	1:35
7.	"The Unborn"	Viljanen	Haukio	3:41
8.	"Fragile Flesh"	Viljanen, Kokko	Kokko	4:01
9.	"Pressure"	Haukio	Haukio	6:16
10.	"The Glass Womb"	(instrumental)	Haukio	4:30
11.	"Blood of Heroes" (Megadeth cover, digipak bonus track)	Dave Mustaine	Mustaine	3:28
12.	"No More" (digipack bonus track)			3:16
13.	"Pure (Demo)" (bonus track)			6:08

== Personnel ==
=== Band members ===
- Jori Haukio – guitar, programming and djembe
- Ville Viljanen – vocals
- Jarkko Kokko – guitar
- Mikko Sipola – drums
- Teemu Heinola – bass
- Joona Kukkola – keyboards

=== Guest musician ===
- Maiju Tommila – vocalist

=== Other credits ===
- Ahti Kortelainen – recording and mixing
- Mika Jussila – mastering
- Jori Haukio and Mors Principium Est – production
- Mattias Norén – cover art
- Toni Mailanen – booklet artwork, layout and photography
