= Lyzanxia =

French metal band

- Origin: Angers, France
- Genres: Death metal, thrash metal
- Years active: 1996–2011
- Label: Listenable Records
- Members: Franck Potvin; David Potvin; Vins Perdicaro; Clément Rouxel
- Past members: Dirk Verbeuren; Gaël Feret; Eguil Voisin; Gweltaz Kerjan; Clément Decrock
- Website: www.lyzanxia.com

Lyzanxia is a French metal group that combines thrash metal with elements of death metal.

== Biography ==
Lyzanxia were formed in 1996 by the Potvin brothers. They recorded their first demo, RIP My Skin. In 1997, they self-released their eleven-track demo Lullaby in France.

For their debut album, Eden, they recruited producer Fredrik Nordström. The album was released in 2000 to good reviews (6/6 Hard Rock: France, 84/100 Burrn!: Japan). Videos for the songs "Bewitched" and "Dream Feeder" were released to promote the album.

In 2002, Lyzanxia recorded their second album, Mindcrimes, produced by Nordström. The Potvin brothers travelled to Gothenburg, Sweden to mix the songs with Nordström and master the album with Goran Finnberg. To support the album, Lyzanxia released the videos "Silence Code" (directed by Yohann Jouin) and "Medulla Need" (directed by Guillaume Pin). They toured with Shaman and Behemoth to promote the album. At the end of 2003, following an article in the magazine Brave Words and Bloody Knuckles, the group negotiated a worldwide contract with Californian label Reality Entertainment. Mindcrimes was released in North America on March 9, 2004, and soon after in several European countries. In 2006, Lyzanxia signed with Listenable Records. They recorded and mixed their third album, Unsu, in January and February at Studio Fredman in Sweden with Nordström assisted by Patrik J. Sten.

After the release of Unsu, the Potvin brothers and the other members worked on several outside projects and collaborations, and the group started to perform less. In 2010, they released their fourth and last album, Locust, favorably received by the critics who saw the album as a amalgamation of the French thrash metal. Lyzanxia continued to perform in 2011, taking a stage in June at Hellfest.

== Members ==
Current members

- Franck Potvin - vocals, guitar
- David Potvin - vocals, guitar
- Perdicaro Wines - bass
- Clément Rouxel - drums

Session musicians/former members

- Gaël Feret - drums
- Close Eguil - bass
- Gweltaz Kerjan - drums
- Dirk Verbeuren - drums
- Clément Decrock - drums

== Discography ==
- 1996: RIP My Skin (demo)
- 1997: Lullaby (demo)
- 2000: Eden
- 2003: Mindcrimes
- 2006: Unsu
- 2010: Locust
