= Mors Principium Est =

Finnish melodic death metal band

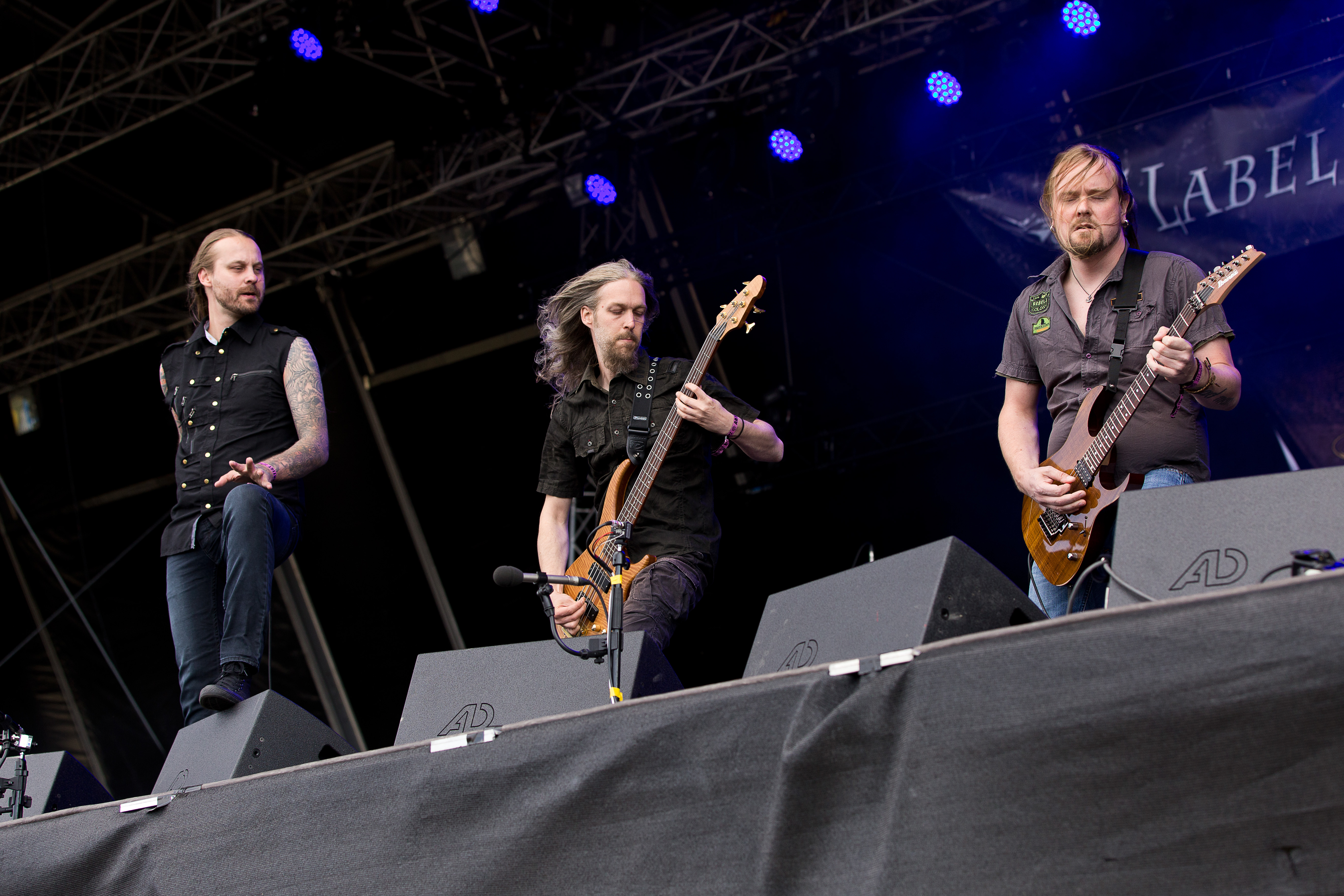
- Mors Principium Est performing in 2016

Background information
- Origin: Pori, Finland
- Genres: Melodic death metal, symphonic metal
- Years active: 1999–present
- Labels: Listenable (2002–2007); AFM (2012–present)
- Members: Ville Viljanen; Jarkko Kokko; Jori Haukio; Teemu Heinola; Marko Tommila
- Past members: See below
- Website: morsprincipiumest.com

Mors Principium Est (Latin for "death is the beginning") is a Finnish melodic death metal band formed in 1999.

== History ==
Singer/lead guitarist Jori Haukio, guitarist Jarkko Kokko, and keyboardist Toni Nummelin formed the band in 1999 in Pori, Finland. Drummer Mikko Sipola joined in late 1999, followed by vocalist Ville Viljanen in early 2000, when Haukio focused on guitar. Bassist Teemu Heinola joined after the band's first demo, Before Birth, which attracted French label Listenable Records in 2001.

One year and two demos later, Mors Principium Est signed a three-album contract with Listenable Records completed by the album Liberation = Termination released in March 2007.

The band announced a new lineup on 25 April 2007. Rhythm guitarist Karri Kuisma joined in 2006. Lead guitarist Tomy Laisto joined in 2007. Jarkko Kokko remained a member but would not play live.

In March 2011, the band stated that members Tomy Laisto and Kalle Aaltonen had left to pursue other ventures. The band stated, "If we still want to continue with Mors Principium Est, we need new guitar players," and asked anyone around the world to try out.

In April 2012, the band signed with AFM Records. The first single for fourth album ...And Death Said Live was released in October of the same year, followed by the album release in December in Japan, and a United States release in January 2013. The band's deal with AFM continued with Dawn of the 5th Era in 2014, Embers of a Dying World in 2017, and Seven in 2020.

In June 2021, the band announced that they had parted ways with their lead guitarist since 2011, Andy Gillion, who was unaware of his removal. In February 2022, the band announced a compilation album of rerecorded material, Liberate the Unborn Inhumanity, with a new version of "The Lust Called Knowledge" from their debut album, Inhumanity, released on the same day. The album was released on April of the same year.

== Band members ==
=== Current ===
- Ville Viljanen – vocals (2000–present)
- Jori Haukio – lead guitar (1999–2007, 2021–present)
- Jarkko Kokko – rhythm & lead guitar (1999–2009, 2021–present)
- Teemu Heinola – bass (2001–present)
- Marko Tommila – drums (2021–present), session drums (2007, 2020)

=== Former ===
- Toni Nummelin – keyboards (1999–2004)
- Mikko Sipola – drums (1999–2017)
- Tomy Laisto – lead guitar (2007–2011), live rhythm guitar (2016–2017)
- Joona Kukkola – keyboards (2004–2007)
- Kalle Aaltonen – rhythm guitar (2009–2011)
- Andy Gillion – lead guitar (2011–2021)
- Andhe Chandler – rhythm guitar (2011–2014)
- Kevin Verlay – rhythm guitar (2014–2015)
- Iiro Aittokoski – drums (2017–2021)

=== Touring ===
- Karri Kuisma – live rhythm guitar (2007–2008)
- Tom "Tomma" Gardiner – live rhythm guitar (2008–2009)
- Lauri Unkila – live rhythm guitar (2017–2021)
- Joni Suodenjärvi – live bass (2019–2021)

== Discography ==
=== Albums ===
- Inhumanity (2003, reissued in 2006)
- The Unborn (2005)
- Liberation = Termination (2007)
- ...And Death Said Live (2012)
- Dawn of the 5th Era (2014)
- Embers of a Dying World (2017)
- Seven (2020)
- Liberate the Unborn Inhumanity (2022)
- Darkness Invisible (2025)

=== Demos ===
- Before Birth (2000)
- Valley of Sacrifice (2001)
- Third Arrival (2002)
