= Liberation = Termination =

Studio album by Mors Principium Est
- Released: March 27, 2007
- Studio: Imperial Mastering, Concord, California
- Genre: Melodic death metal
- Length: 38.13
- Label: Listenable Records

Mors Principium Est chronology
The Unborn (2005)	Liberation = Termination (2007)	...And Death Said Live (2012)

Professional ratings
Review scores
Source	Rating
About.com	3.5/5 stars

Liberation = Termination is the third studio album by Finnish melodic death metal band Mors Principium Est. It was released on March 27, 2007, in the United States.

== Track listing ==
No.	Title	Lyrics	Music	Length
1.	"Orsus"	(instrumental)	Anssi Kippo, Ville Viljanen, Joona Kukkola	0:25
2.	"The Oppressed Will Rise"	Viljanen	Jori Haukio	3:18
3.	"The Animal Within"	Viljanen	Haukio	3:30
4.	"Finality"	Viljanen	Haukio	3:17
5.	"Cleansing Rain"	Viljanen, Haukio	Haukio	4:19
6.	"Forgotten"	(instrumental)	Jarkko Kokko	1:42
7.	"Sinners Defeat"	Viljanen	Haukio	5:25
8.	"The Distance Between"	Viljanen	Haukio	4:17
9.	"It Is Done"	Viljanen	Kokko	2:49
10.	"Terminal Liberation"	Viljanen	Haukio	4:13
11.	"Lost Beyond Retrieval"	(instrumental)	Kokko	4:41

== Personnel ==
=== Musicians ===
- Jori Haukio – guitars, programming
- Ville Viljanen – vocals
- Jarkko Kokko – guitars
- Marko Tommila – drums
- Teemu Heinola – bass
- Joona Kukkola – keyboards
