= Forever Black =

Studio album by Cirith Ungol
- Released: April 24, 2020
- Genre: Heavy metal; doom metal
- Length: 39:05
- Label: Metal Blade

Cirith Ungol studio album chronology
Paradise Lost (1991)	Forever Black (2020)	Dark Parade (2023)

Official audio
- "Forever Black (Full Album)" on YouTube

Forever Black is the fifth studio album by the American heavy metal band Cirith Ungol. It was released on April 24, 2020, and is the band's first studio album since its reunion in 2016, and its first studio album since Paradise Lost in 1991. Metal Hammer named it the 42nd-best metal album of 2020.

== Track listing ==
No.	Title	Length
1.	"The Call"	1:04
2.	"Legions Arise"	3:19
3.	"The Frost Monstreme"	5:15
4.	"The Fire Divine"	3:51
5.	"Stormbringer"	5:58
6.	"Fractus Promissum"	4:08
7.	"Nightmare"	5:59
8.	"Before Tomorrow"	3:57
9.	"Forever Black"	5:34

== Charts ==
Chart performance for Forever Black
Chart (2020)	Peak position
Canadian Albums (Billboard)	130
German Albums (Offizielle Top 100)	11
Swiss Albums (Schweizer Hitparade)	25
