= Amaran (band) =

Swedish metal band (2000–2005)

- Origin: Stockholm, Sweden
- Genres: Thrash metal, melodic death metal, gothic metal
- Years active: 2000–2005
- Label: Listenable Records
- Members: Ronnie Backlund; Gunnar Hammar; Niklas Sandin; Robin Bergh

Amaran was a Swedish metal band. Their music combines heavy metal guitars with singer Johanna DePierre's clear voice.

== History ==
=== Formation ===
The band was named after a Hindi term for "undying" or "everlasting". Amaran started in the spring of 2000, in Stockholm, Sweden, and wrote songs that combine heavy metal guitars with clear female vocals. Guitarists Kari Kainulainen and Ronnie Backlund wrote music together and formed a band. They recruited bass player Mikael Andersson, vocalist Johanna DePierre, and drummer Robin Bergh. All members came from different musical backgrounds.

=== "Promo" (2001) ===
Before Amaran had found a drummer they recorded their first "Promo" using a drum machine and sent it to various zines, magazines and record labels. It received reviews in many contexts, which got them a deal with the French record label, Listenable Records.

=== A World Depraved (2002) ===
The band set out to record their debut album A World Depraved in February 2002 in Aabenraa Studio in Denmark together with Jacob Hansen. The album was released over Europe and was highly recommended by critics and fans all over. The album was often described as somewhat original, in the sense that the combination of heavy guitars and intense drums and the clear female vocals was not something that people were used to hearing.

=== Pristine In Bondage (2004) ===
Amaran was eager to write new songs after the release of the debut and developed a whole lot in this process and as a band during 2002. Since the band was pretty young when they landed the record deal they went through a whole lot both on a personal and professional level and became tighter as a band. The band finished about 14 songs that they wanted to record and agreed with Listenable to record the follow-up in April 2003. The new material was oriented in a heavier direction as to accentuate the dynamics between the instrumental and the vocals further. The album was recorded in Studio Underground, Sweden with Pelle Saether and was entitled Pristine in Bondage. Shortly after finishing the recording of the second album, bass player Mikael decided that he wanted to leave the band for personal reasons. They quickly found someone to replace him in Ronnie Bergerståhl, an experienced bass player and drummer who was a personal friend and had filled in for Mikael before.

Pristine in Bondage was set to be released through Listenable Records on 17 December in Japan (containing three bonus tracks) and, in January, in Europe and the US containing 11 tracks. Amaran has also recorded a video for the song "Inflict" on the new album and was set to go on promotion tours in the fall and in January connected the release of the album.

=== Break up ===
Drummer Robin Bergh left the band for personal reasons in 2004; he was replaced with Pär Hjulström. 2005 saw a parade of new members pass through Amaran, culminating in December with the dissolution of the band. Primary among the reasons for this is the departure of lead singer Johanna DePierre, and the band's inability to find a suitable replacement (Amaran's sole focus as a band was heavy riffs with clean female vocals). Amaran officially broke up on December 28, 2005.

== Members ==
=== Final line-up ===
- Ronnie Backlund - Guitar (2000–2005)
- Gunnar Hammar - Guitar (2005)
- Niklas Sandi - Bass (2005)
- Robin Bergh - Drums (2001–2003, 2004–2005)

=== Former members ===
- Kari Kainulainen - Guitar (2000–2004)
- Mikael Andersson - Bass (2000–2003)
- Ronnie Bergerståhl - Bass (2003–2004)
- Johanna DePierre - Vocals (2000–2005)
- Pär Hjulström - Drums (2004; live 2004)

=== Live members ===
- Ronnie Bergerståhl - Bass (2002)
- Esa Orjatsalo - Guitars (2004) (played live as a replacement for Ronnie Backlund while he was recovering from an arm fracture)

=== Timeline ===
The following is a visual summary of the history section above, though a text summary is provided below:

The initial members on 1 May 2000 were Johanna de Pierre (vocals), Kari Kainulainen (guitar), Ronnie Backlund (guitar), and Mikael Andersson (bass). They released the early demo. Robin Bergh (drums) joined on 1 July 2001. They released a studio album on 20 May 2002. Mikael Andersson (bass) left on 1 December 2003, and gets replaced by Ronnie Bergerståhl. On 20 January 2004, they released another studio album. Robin Bergh (drums) left on 1 April, getting replaced by Pär Hjulström the same day. Kari Kainulainen (guitar) left on 1 September. Ronnie Bergerståhl (bass) left the same day. Pär Hjulström (drums) left on 1 November, getting replaced by Robin Bergh the same day. Gunnar Hammar (guitar) joined on 1 March 2005. Niklas Sandi (bass) joined the same day. The timeline ended on 1 August 2005.

== Discography ==
- "Promo" (April, 2001)
- A World Depraved (May 20, 2002)
- Pristine in Bondage (January 20, 2004)
