= Sybreed =

Swiss industrial metal band

Background information
- Origin: Geneva, Switzerland
- Genres: Industrial metal, cyber metal, groove metal
- Years active: 2003–2014; 2025–present
- Label: Listenable
- Members: Thomas "Drop" Betrisey; Ales Campanelli; Kevin Choiral; Benjamin Nominet
- Past members: Alex Anxonnia; Dirk Verbeuren; Luis "Burn" Da Silva Cruz; Stéphane Grand
- Website: sybreed.net

Sybreed (a portmanteau of "synthetic" and "breed") is a Swiss industrial metal band from Geneva. The band was founded in 2003 by vocalist Benjamin Nominet and guitarist Thomas "Drop" Betrisey. Sybreed disbanded in 2013 when Nominet departed from the group, and reunited in 2025.

== History ==
The band was founded by Thomas "Drop" Betrisey (guitar) and Benjamin Nominet (vocals) after their previous band Rain broke-up. They recruited Luis "Burn" Da Silva Cruz on bass and Alex Anxonnia on drums to record their debut album, Slave Design, produced by Drop and Claude Lander. Slave Design was released on 7 September 2004 through Reality Entertainment/Caroline Distribution. In early 2006, the band uploaded a song entitled "Emma-Zero" to its MySpace page; this song would appear on Antares under the name "Emma-O". Drummer Alex Anxonnia departed Sybreed in February 2006, citing musical and personal differences; Anxonnia would form the industrial death metal band Etna in 2007, which became Breach the Void in 2009. Dirk Verbeuren was hired as a session musician that April to record the drums for the band's then upcoming album, which would be Antares. Antares was recorded and mixed throughout 2006 and was released on 1 October 2007 through Listenable Records.

Kevin Choiral joined the band in 2006 as its permanent drummer. Around the same time, bassist Luis "Burn" Da Silva Cruz left the band and was replaced by Stéphane Grand. Sybreed's first release with this new line-up was the EP A.E.O.N. and was released on 21 July 2009 through Listenable. The EP featured the songs "A.E.O.N." and "Human Black Box", which would appear on the band's third studio album The Pulse of Awakening, along with three remixes of the song "Emma-O", which originally appeared on Antares. The band's third studio album, The Pulse of Awakening, was released later that year on 16 November. The song "Doomsday Party" was released for free download for the video game Rock Band on 7 April 2010.

In 2011, Sybreed recorded and released the EP Challenger in promotion for its upcoming fourth album. Later that year in June, Grand left the band and was replaced on bass by Ales Campanelli. The band's fourth and final studio album, God Is an Automaton, was released on 24 September 2012. The next day, on 25 September, a music video, the band's first, was released for the song "Hightech Versus Lowlife" showing the band performing the song in studio. Sybreed gained some minor mainstream exposure in December 2012 when Rachel Aspe performed the song "Emma-O" on the French talent show La France a un incroyable talent. A music video for the song "No Wisdom Brings Solace" was released on 20 December. On 20 February 2013, a music video was released for the song "The Line of Least Resistance." Unlike the performance-centered nature of the previous two videos, the music video for "The Line of Least Resistance" is more narrative focused, following a woman who discovers she is secretly an android in disguise along with shots of the band performing the song.

In October 2013, the band announced that singer Benjamin Nominet had left the band. All tour dates were cancelled and the band decided to break up in July 2014.

The band released a 20th anniversary remastered edition of Slave Design in 2024. On 10 April 2025, Sybreed released a cover of the Tears for Fears song "Shout". The cover is set to appear on the reissue of The Pulse of Awakening, with a planned release date of 30 May. The Pulse of Awakening reissue will be released alongside reissues of Antares and God Is an Automaton.

On 13 May 2025, Sybreed announced their reunion and plan to release new music.

== Members ==
=== Current lineup ===
- Benjamin Nominet – vocals (2003–2013, 2025–present)
- Thomas "Drop" Betrisey – guitars, programming (2003–2014, 2025–present)
- Ales Campanelli – bass (2011–2014, 2025–present)
- Kevin Choiral – drums (2007–2014, 2025–present)

=== Former ===
- Luis "Burn" Da Silva Cruz – bass (2003–2009)
- Stéphane Grand – bass (2009–2011)
- Alex Anxionaz – drums (2003–2006)
- Dirk Verbeuren (session member) – drums (2007)

== Discography ==
=== Studio albums ===
Year	Album	Label
2004	Slave Design	Reality Entertainment
2007	Antares	Listenable
2009	The Pulse of Awakening	Listenable
2012	God Is an Automaton	Listenable

=== EPs ===
Year	Album	Label
2009	A.E.O.N.	Listenable
2011	Challenger	Listenable
2024	System Debaser	Independent
2025	Bonus Tracks	Independent
