= Marta Gabriel =

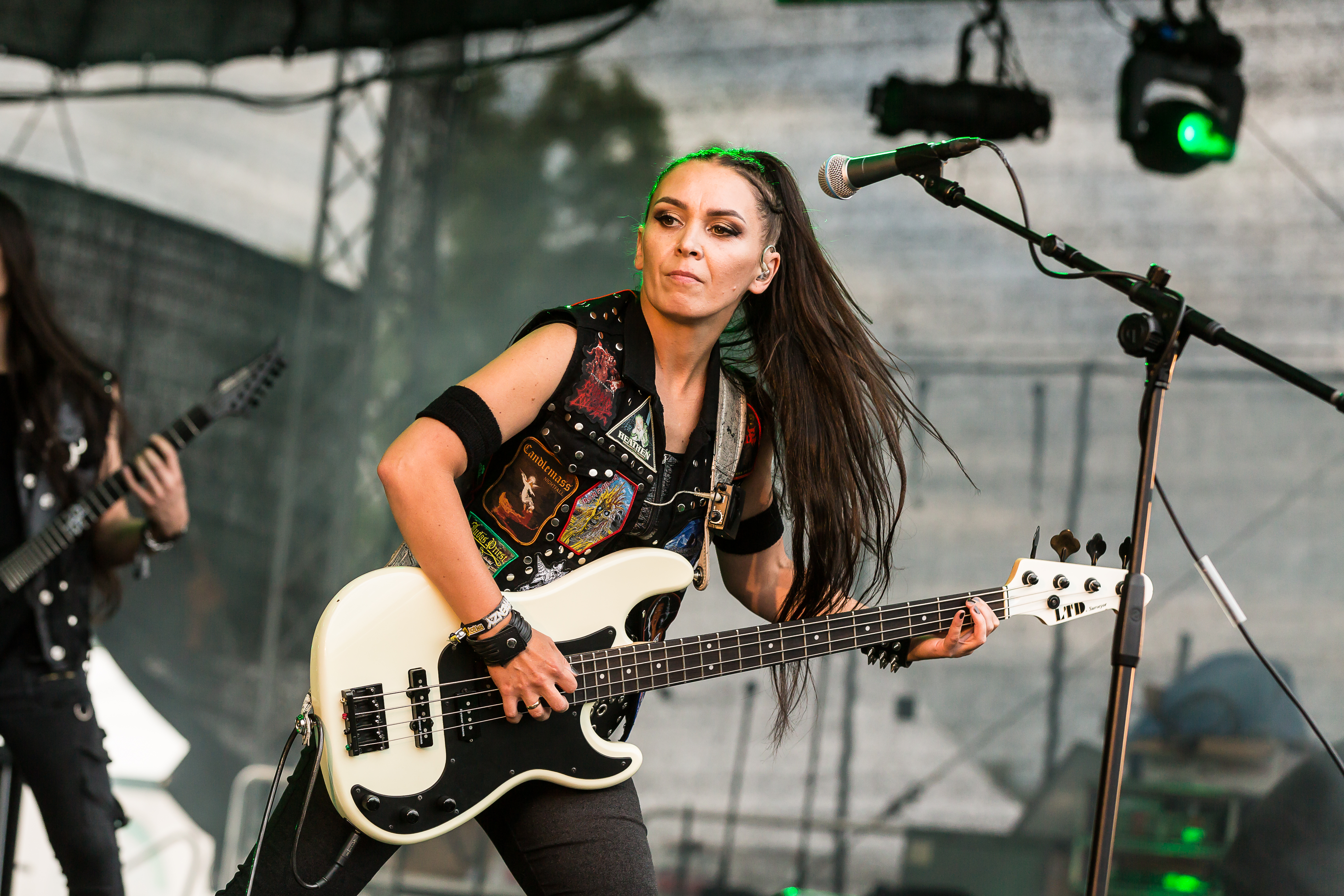

Background information
- Also known as: Leatherwitch
- Born: February 25, 1984 (age 42)
- Genres: Heavy metal, power metal, speed metal
- Instruments: Vocals, Bass
- Years active: 2003-present
- Label: Listenable Records
- Member of: Crystal Viper

Marta Gabriel is a musician from Poland. She had a long career in the band Crystal Viper, and recorded a solo album and an album with Moon Chamber.

== Music career ==
Marta Gabriel began her career doing vocals for the band 448. She started the band Crystal Viper in 2003. Their debut album, The Curse of Crystal Viper, was released in 2007. Since then they have released nine studio albums, one live album, many singles, and took part in several tribute albums. The band also toured across more than ten countries. She writes the lyrics of the songs following influences of the Lovecraftian horror literary genre.

She started another band in 2019, Moon Chamber. Her husband Bart Gabriel reissued a single of the band Saracen and sent some copies to the guitarist Rob Bendelow. Bendelow then discovered Crystal Viper, and wrote songs for Marta Gabriel. Being a fan of Saracen as well, Gabriel proposed to him that they record a new album together, alongside Andy from Pagan Altar and Paul Bradder from Saracen. The name Moon Chamber is from a project that Marta Gabriel had in mind for a doom metal album, that would depart from the style of Crystal Viper. The band released the album "Lore of the Land".

In addition, she released a cover album in 2021, "Metal Queens", with songs from 1980s female artists of heavy metal bands. She said that "It’s a celebration and tribute to some of my favorite female vocalists, and a solid piece of heavy metal that fans might enjoy even if they don’t know original versions of those songs. It’s not a random collection of covers – we made sure that it sounds like one big piece, like a real album, and it has this taking-no-prisoners attitude". She also made a video of the cover song "Count your blessings" from the band Malteze.

Marta Gabriel joined the Japanese band Metalucifer as a session musician for their tour in Europe. The tour will conclude at the Black Silesia festival.

Crystal Viper was disbanded in 2025. She started a solo project in 2026, named "Leatherwitch", and signed with Listenable Records. They announced that the single "Beast inside" would be released on March 5.

== Business ==
Marta Gabriel also started a clothing company, Thunderball Clothing. The bands Wizard, Sabaton and Vader were among its clients.

They got in a controversy in December 2018. The photographer J. Salmeron took a photo of Alissa White-Gluz, vocalist of Arch Enemy, and uploaded it to his Instagram account. White-Gluz did the same, and Thunderball Clothing did it as well because White-Gluz was wearing their products in the shot. Salmeron did not like that his photo was being used for advertising of a company without authorization, and told them that although his usual fee was €500, he would not enforce it if they made a donation of €100 to the Dutch Cancer Society. Gabriel deleted the image and informed White-Gluz of the situation, leading to a partly public discourse between Salmeron and Angela Gossow (former Arch Enemy frontwoman and business manager of Arch Enemy and Alissa White-Gluz). Online harassment, insults and threats ensued by many Instagram users - both parties expressed their discontent with this behaviour. Overwhelmed by internet trolls, Gabriel closed Thunderball Clothing the following day.

== Discography ==
=== With Crystal Viper ===
- 2007 - The Curse of Crystal Viper
- 2009 - Metal Nation
- 2010 - Legends
- 2012 - Crimen Excepta
- 2013 - Possession
- 2017 - Queen of the Witches
- 2019 - Tales of Fire and Ice
- 2021 - The Cult
- 2024 - The Silver Key
- 2025 - The Live Quest

=== With Moon Chamber ===
- 2019 - Lore of the Land

=== Solo ===
- 2021 - Metal Queens (tribute album)
