= Slave Design =

Studio album by Sybreed
- Released: 7 September 2004
- Recorded: 2003–2004
- Studios: The Drone, Geneva, Switzerland; Taurus Studios, Geneva, Switzerland
- Genres: Industrial metal; cyber metal; groove metal
- Length: 51:07
- Label: Reality Entertainment
- Producers: Thomas "Drop" Betrisey; Claude Lander

Sybreed chronology
Slave Design (2004)	Antares (2007)

Professional ratings
Review scores
Source	Rating
Imperiumi.net	5/10
Metal.de	8/10
Sputnikmusic	4.2/5

Slave Design is the debut album by Swiss industrial metal band Sybreed. The album was released on 7 September 2004 under Reality Entertainment, and was remastered and re-released as a 20th anniversary edition on 4 October 2024. The album was remastered by Jens Bogren and includes new artwork by Erik Kirchner. It also has two bonus tracks recorded in 2023; a re-recording of "Bioactive" and a track titled "System Debaser" that was originally written in 2003 for the original album but was since shelved.

== Track listing ==
All lyrics are written by Benjamin Nominet; all music is composed by Thomas "Drop" Betrisey.

Slave Design track listing
No.	Title	Length
1.	"Bioactive"	6:27
2.	"ReEvolution"	4:03
3.	"Decoy"	5:07
4.	"Synthetic Breed"	5:19
5.	"Next Day Will Never Come"	5:24
6.	"Machine Gun Messiah"	4:18
7.	"Take the Red Pill"	5:00
8.	"Rusted"	5:34
9.	"Static Currents"	3:44
10.	"Critical Mass"	6:11
Total length:		51:07

2004 original edition bonus tracks
No.	Title	Length
11.	"ReEvolution" (Syntax Airplay Edit)	3:54
12.	"Decoy" (Radio Slave Edit)	4:01
Total length:		59:02

2024 remastered edition bonus tracks
No.	Title	Length
11.	"Bioactive" (2024 Rerecorded Version)	6:36
12.	"System Debaser"	6:25
Total length:		64:08

== Personnel ==
Sybreed

- Benjamin Nominet – vocals
- Thomas "Drop" Betrisey – guitars, electronics, producer, guitar and bass recording, mixing
- Luis "Burn" Da Silva Cruz – bass
- Alex Anxionaz – drums, percussion

Additional (2004 edition)

- Claude Lander – co-producer, vocal and drum recording, mixing
- Bob Stone – mastering
- Marc Eikasia – cover design
- Chris Kallias – booklet design
- Micha Riechsteiner – photography

Additional (2024 remastered edition)

- Jens Bogren – remastering
- Erik Kirchner – artwork
