= Embers of a Dying World =

Studio album by Mors Principium Est
- Released: 10 February 2017
- Recorded: 2016
- Studios: Ansa Studio, Finland; Studio Gillionsdottir
- Genres: Melodic death metal, symphonic black metal
- Length: 50:03
- Label: AFM Records
- Producers: Andy Gillion; Ville Viljanen

Mors Principium Est chronology
Dawn of the 5th Era (2014)	Embers of a Dying World (2017)	Seven (2020)

Professional ratings
Review scores
Source	Rating
Dead Rhetoric	8/10
Eternal Terror	4/6
Heavymetal.dk	6/10
Louder Sound	3/5
Metal Purgatory Media	9.5/10
New Noise Magazine	4.5/5
Ultimate Guitar	8/10

Embers of a Dying World is the sixth studio album by Finnish melodic death metal band Mors Principium Est. It was released on 10 February 2017 via AFM Records.

== Track listing ==
All tracks are written by Andy Gillion with additional lyrics by Ville Viljanen.

No.	Title	Length
1.	"Genesis" (intro)	1:32
2.	"Reclaim the Sun"	4:40
3.	"Masquerade"	5:05
4.	"Into the Dark"	5:07
5.	"The Drowning" (limited edition bonus track)	4:31
6.	"Death Is the Beginning"	6:28
7.	"Agnus Dei" (instrumental)	2:00
8.	"The Ghost"	6:19
9.	"In Torment"	4:30
10.	"The Colours of the Cosmos"	4:38
11.	"Apprentice of Death"	5:13
12.	"Livin' la Vida Loca" (Ricky Martin cover) (Japanese edition bonus track)	3:01
Total length:		53:04

Note: "Agnus Dei" was moved to after "In Torment" in the Japanese edition.

== Credits ==
=== Musicians ===
- Ville Viljanen – vocals
- Andy Gillion – guitars, programming, orchestrations
- Teemu Heinola – bass
- Mikko Sipola – drums

=== Production ===
- Thomas 'Plec' Johansson – mixing, mastering
- Teemu Heinola – recording (bass, drums, vocals)
- Andy Gillion – recording (guitars, programming, orchestrations)
