= Inhumanity (album) =

Studio album by Mors Principium Est
- Released: April 18, 2003
- Recorded: December 2002
- Studio: Tico-Tico Studio, Kemi, Finland
- Genre: Melodic death metal
- Label: Listenable Records
- Producer: Mors Principium Est

Mors Principium Est chronology
Inhumanity (2003)	The Unborn (2005)

Alternative cover
- Cover artwork for the 2006 reissue

Professional ratings
Review scores
Source	Rating
Allmusic	4/5 stars
BraveWords	9/10 stars
Metal.de	7/10 stars
Rock Hard	5/10 stars

Inhumanity is the debut studio album by Finnish melodic death metal band Mors Principium Est. It was first released in 2003 and later reissued on February 20, 2006 with new artwork and three bonus tracks. Singer was Villa Viljanen. They released three further LP's before splitting up.

== Track listing ==
=== Original 2003 release ===
No.	Title	Lyrics	Music	Length
1.	"Another Creation"	Ville Viljanen	Jori Haukio	4:56
2.	"Eternity's Child"	Viljanen	Haukio	3:43
3.	"In My Words"	Viljanen, Haukio	Haukio	3:40
4.	"Inhumanity"	Viljanen, Haukio	Haukio	3:18
5.	"D.I.B."	Viljanen	Haukio	4:44
6.	"The Lust Called Knowledge"	Viljanen	Haukio	4:25
7.	"Oblivion"	(instrumental)	Haukio	2:12
8.	"Life in Black"	Viljanen, Haukio	Haukio	3:40
9.	"Last Apprentice"	Viljanen	Haukio	2:45
10.	"Into Illusion"	Haukio	Haukio	5:09
11.	"Hijo de la Luna" (Japanese bonus track)			4:26

=== 2006 re-release bonus tracks ===
No.	Title	Length
11.	"The Lust Called Knowledge" (2005 remix)	4:00
12.	"Inhumanity" (live)	3:17
13.	"Pure" (live) (the original album version of this track can be found on The Unborn)	6:24

== Personnel ==
=== Musicians ===
- Jori Haukio – guitars
- Ville Viljanen – vocals
- Jarkko Kokko – guitars
- Mikko Sipola – drums
- Teemu Heinola – bass
- Toni Nummelin – keyboards

=== Others ===
- Ahti Kortelainen – recording and mixing
- Mika Jussila – mastering
- Mors Principium Est – production
- Markus Niinisalo – artwork and photography
