= Darkness Invisible =

Studio album by Mors Principium Est
- Released: 26 September 2025
- Recorded: 2024
- Studio: Ansa Studio, Ulvila, Finland
- Genre: Symphonic metal, melodic death metal
- Length: 46:58
- Label: Reigning Phoenix Music
- Producer: Ville Viljanen

Mors Principium Est chronology
Liberate the Unborn Inhumanity (2022)	Darkness Invisible (2025)

Singles from Darkness Invisible
- 1. "Of Death" Released: 22 May 2025; 2. "All Life Is Evil" Released: 15 September 2025

Professional ratings
Review scores
Source	Rating
Dead Rhetoric	9/10
Heavymetal.dk	7/10

Darkness Invisible is the ninth studio album by Finnish melodic death metal band Mors Principium Est, released on 26 September 2025 via Reigning Phoenix Music. The album was streamed entirely on YouTube a day prior. "Of Death" was released as a single on the day of the album's announcement.

== Track listing ==
All music is composed by Jori Haukio.

No.	Title	Lyrics	Length
1.	"Of Death"	Ville Viljanen	5:34
2.	"Venator"	Jori Haukio	3:48
3.	"Monuments"	Viljanen	5:59
4.	"Tenebrae Latebra"	Haukio	1:49
5.	"Summoning the Dark"	Viljanen	5:56
6.	"Beyond the Horizon"	Viljanen	5:48
7.	"The Rivers of Avernus"	Haukio	4:57
8.	"In Sleep There Is Peace"	Viljanen	4:16
9.	"An Aria of the Damned"	Haukio	2:29
10.	"All Life Is Evil"	Viljanen	6:22
11.	"Makso mitä makso" (Isac Elliot cover)	Isac Elliot	2:49
Total length:			49:47

== Credits ==
=== Musicians ===
- Ville Viljanen – vocals
- Jarkko Kokko – guitars
- Jori Haukio – guitars, programming
- Teemu Heinola – bass
- Marko Tommila – drums

=== Guests ===
- Anna Dinyes – female vocals

=== Production ===
- Jens Bogren – mixing
- Tony Lindgren – mastering
- Teemu Heinola – recording (bass, drums, vocals)
- Jarkko Kokko – recording (guitars, programming)
- Jori Haukio – recording (guitars, programming)
- Alvaro Valverde Fernandez – artwork, layout
- Jun Kawai – liner notes
