= Andy Gillion =

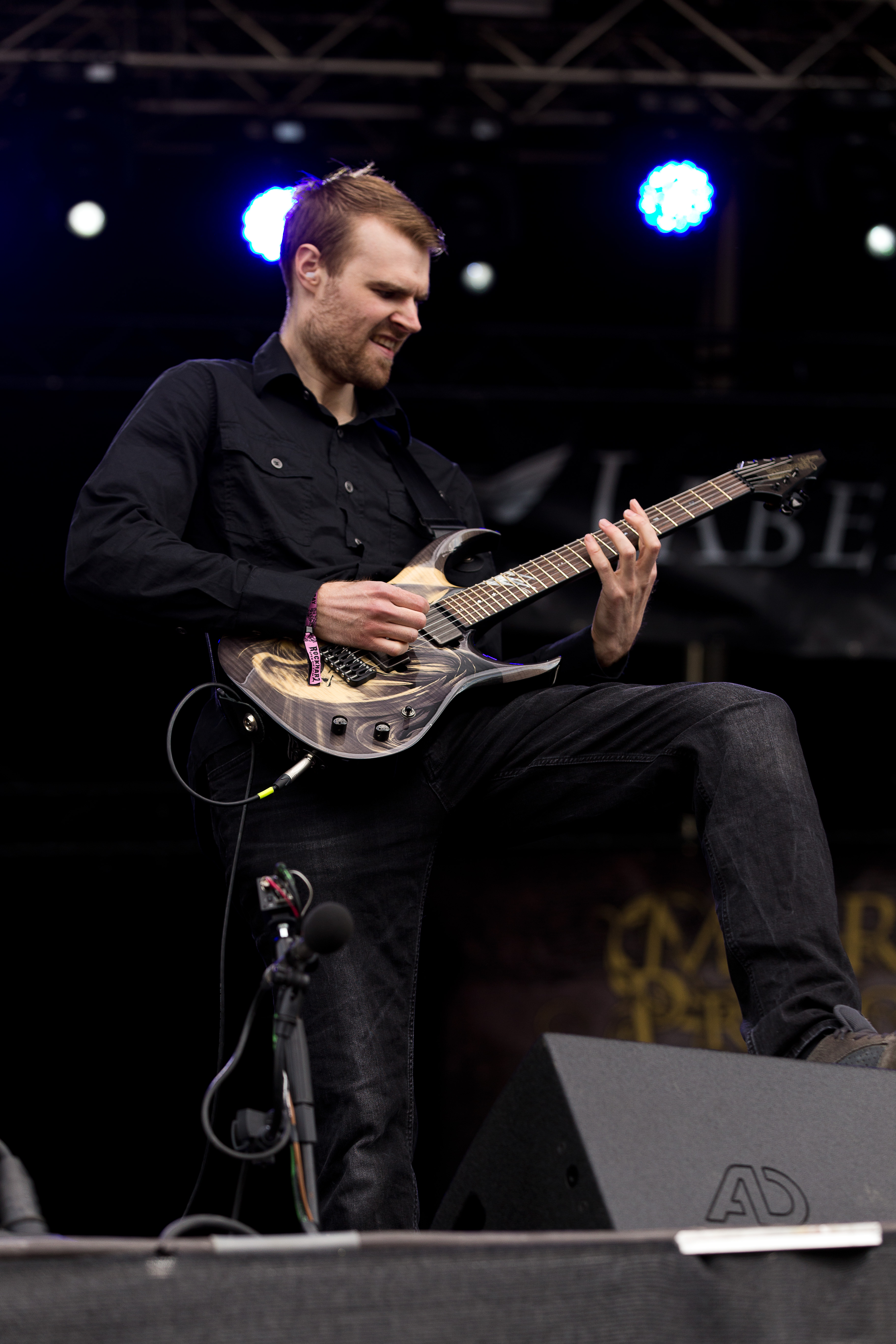

Background information
- Born: 4 September 1988 (age 37)
- Origin: United Kingdom
- Genres: Melodic death metal, progressive metal
- Occupations: Musician, composer
- Instruments: Guitar, piano, vocals
- Website: www.andygillion.com

Andy Gillion (born 4 September 1988) is a British-born multi-instrumentalist, composer, and songwriter. He is best known as the former songwriter and lead guitarist of the melodic death metal band, Mors Principium Est.

His debut solo album, Neverafter, was released on 15 November 2019. The first single, "Skyless" features Jeff Loomis of Arch Enemy, and Sam Paulicelli (66Samus) of Decrepit Birth.

As of 2017, Gillion is endorsed as an Elixir Strings Artist, as well as a Fractal Audio Artist.

== Biography ==
In 2011, Andy Gillion was selected as the new songwriter/lead guitarist for the melodic death metal band, Mors Principium Est from over 200 applicants. Since then, he has written and released four albums with the band, under AFM Records: ...And Death Said Live (2012), Dawn of the 5th Era (2014), Embers of a Dying World (2017) and Seven (2020).

In 2016, Gillion was a runner up in the final of the Guitar Idol Competition and performed live at the 100 Club in London, UK.

In November 2019, his debut solo album, Neverafter was released. The first single, "Skyless" features Jeff Loomis of Arch Enemy, and Sam Paulicelli (66Samus) of Decrepit Birth. The album also features Paul Wardingham and Christina Marie of The Voice. The record was co-produced, mixed, and mastered by Thomas “Plec” Johansson, who previously worked with bands like Soilwork and Scar Symmetry.

Andy has authored a novel set during the Second World War entitled 'Far From Grace' which was published on Amazon.

Andy also composed and played the soundtrack for the Game 'Metal Heads', released by Otreum Games in March 2021.

== Neverafter (2019) ==
Neverafter, his debut solo album, was released on 15 November 2019. It is a predominantly instrumental concept album composed of symphonic, progressive and melodic death metal elements. The music tells the story of a young girl, Aria, and her journey through a dreamworld as she searches for resolution after the loss of her mother.

The album features Jeff Loomis of Arch Enemy, Sam Paulicelli (66Samus) of Decrepit Birth, Paul Wardingham and Christina Marie of The Voice. The record was co-produced, mixed, and mastered by Thomas “Plec” Johansson, who previously worked with bands like Soilwork and Scar Symmetry. As described by Metal Injection, "Gillion has truly created an epic masterpiece that would have raised Chopin's brow if he were still alive", while MetalSucks commented, "predictably, the results are magnificent"

== Arcade Metal (2022) ==
Arcade Metal, his second solo album, was released on 2 September 2022. It is an instrumental concept album. It features Matt Heafy of Trivium, Jeff Loomis of Arch Enemy, Per Nilsson of Scar Symmetry, Yuzo Koshiro of Streets of Rage, Li-sa-X, Stephen Taranto and Paul Wardingham, and drums throughout by 66Samus of Decrepit Birth.

== Exilium (2024) ==
Exilium is the third solo album by Andy Gillion.

== Discography ==
=== Mors Principium Est ===
- ...And Death Said Live (2012)
- Dawn of the 5th Era (2014)
- Embers of a Dying World (2017)
- Seven (2020)

=== Solo ===
- Neverafter (2019)
- Arcade Metal (2022)
- Exilium (2024)

== Equipment ==
=== Guitars ===
- Daemoness Cimmerian 6 String (Featuring Valkyrie hand painted finish)
- Elixir Strings Artist - NANOWEB Coating

=== Amplification ===
- Fractal Audio Axe-FX
- Neural DSP
