= Dawn of the 5th Era =

Studio album by Mors Principium Est
- Released: 19 November 2014
- Recorded: 2014
- Studio: Ansa Studio, Finland; Studio Gillionsdottir
- Genre: Melodic death metal
- Length: 48:21
- Label: AFM Records
- Producer: Andy Gillion; Ville Viljanen

Mors Principium Est chronology
...And Death Said Live (2012)	Dawn of the 5th Era (2014)	Embers of a Dying World (2017)

Professional ratings
Review scores
Source	Rating
Dead Rhetoric	9/10
Hard Rock Haven	8/10
Heavymetal.dk	8/10
Metal.de	7/10
Powermetal.de	9.5/10
Thrashpit.com	6.5/10
Time for Metal	9.8/10
Ultimate Guitar	8.7/10

Dawn of the 5th Era is the fifth studio album by Finnish melodic death metal band Mors Principium Est. It was released on 19 November 2014 via AFM Records. The band's first official music video was released for "Monster in Me".

== Track listing ==
All tracks are written by Andy Gillion.

No.	Title	Length
1.	"Enter the Asylum" (intro)	1:32
2.	"God Has Fallen"	4:27
3.	"Leader of the Titans"	5:29
4.	"We Are the Sleep"	5:59
5.	"Innocence Lost"	3:54
6.	"I Am War"	4:30
7.	"Monster in Me"	4:38
8.	"Apricity" (instrumental)	2:37
9.	"Wrath of Indra"	3:59
10.	"The Journey"	5:09
11.	"The Forsaken"	6:07
12.	"California Dreamin'" (The Mamas & the Papas cover) (Japanese bonus track)	2:20
Total length:		50:41

== Credits ==
=== Musicians ===
- Ville Viljanen – vocals
- Andy Gillion – lead guitar
- Kevin Verlay – rhythm guitar
- Teemu Heinola – bass guitar
- Mikko Sipola – drums

=== Production ===
- Thomas 'Plec' Johansson – mixing, mastering
- Teemu Heinola – recording (drums, vocals)
- Andy Gillion – recording (guitars, bass, keyboards)
