= Frost and Fire (album) =

- Cover art by Michael Whelan

Studio album by Cirith Ungol
- Released: January 1981
- Recorded: April 1980
- Studios: Gold Mine Studios, Ventura, California
- Genres: Heavy metal; proto-doom
- Length: 31:24
- Label: Liquid Flames Records
- Producer: Cirith Ungol

Cirith Ungol chronology
Cirith Ungol (demo) (1978)	Frost and Fire (1981)	King of the Dead (1984)

Frost and Fire is the debut album by the American heavy metal band Cirith Ungol. Its music is generally faster and more simplistic than that of King of the Dead, which saw the band begin to adopt a doom metal style influenced heavily by power metal.

== Album information ==
Frost and Fire was produced by Cirith Ungol and originally self-released through the band's own record label—Liquid Flames Productions—in 1981. The album was re-released in 1984 by Enigma Records, re-released again along with King of the Dead on one CD by One Way Records in 1995, and finally re-released again in September 1999 on Metal Blade Records. A bootleg picture disc version of this LP, limited to 500 hand-numbered copies, also exists. While Michael "Flint" Vujejia is credited as the bass player on this album, it has been confirmed in several interviews that Greg Lindstrom was actually the bassist on this album. In Brazil, the LP Frost and Fire was released with the cover of the King of the Dead. (1985).

== Critical reception ==
Professional ratings
Review scores
Source	Rating
AllMusic	3/5 stars
Collector's Guide to Heavy Metal	8/10

In 2005, Frost and Fire was ranked number 362 in Rock Hard magazine's book of The 500 Greatest Rock & Metal Albums of All Time.

== Track listing ==
All songs written by Greg Lindstrom. The seventh track, "Maybe That's Why", is an instrumental; however, lyrics were included for the song on the inner sleeve of the original vinyl release.

Side one
No.	Title	Length
1.	"Frost and Fire"	3:35
2.	"I'm Alive"	4:58
3.	"A Little Fire"	3:46
4.	"What Does It Take"	3:36

Side two
No.	Title	Length
5.	"Edge of a Knife"	4:29
6.	"Better Off Dead"	4:45
7.	"Maybe That's Why" (instrumental)	6:15

1999 remastered edition bonus track
No.	Title	Length
8.	"Cirith Ungol" (live)	8:19

== Personnel ==
Cirith Ungol

- Tim Baker – lead and backing vocals
- Jerry Fogle – guitars
- Greg Lindstrom – guitars, synthesizers, e-bow, backing vocals, bass (uncredited)
- Michael "Flint" Vujea – bass
- Robert Garven – drums, backing vocals

Production

- Tim Nelson – engineer
- Allen Zentz – mastering
- Randall L. Jackson – executive producer
