= One Foot in Hell =

- Cover art by Michael Whelan

Studio album by Cirith Ungol
- Released: August 12, 1986
- Genre: Doom metal; power metal
- Length: 35:33
- Label: Metal Blade
- Producer: Brian Slagel, Cirith Ungol

Cirith Ungol chronology
King of the Dead (1984)	One Foot in Hell (1986)	Paradise Lost (1991)

Professional ratings
Review scores
Source	Rating
AllMusic	2/5 stars
Metal Reviews	90/100
Rock Hard	8/10 stars

One Foot in Hell is the third studio album by the American heavy metal band Cirith Ungol. The original LP was produced by Brian Slagel and Cirith Ungol. It was released in August 1986 on Metal Blade Records and re-released in March 1999 by Metal Blade Records on CD. It is the last album to feature guitarist Jerry Fogle and bassist Michael "Flint" Vujea.

Greg Lindstrom said in an interview:

It's an excellent album although I thought the songs overall were not as strong as King of the Dead, and Flint's bass seems to have gotten lost in the mix.

The song "Nadsokor" was covered by the Italian epic doom metal band Doomsword.

== Track listing ==
All songs by Cirith Ungol, except where indicated.

1. "Blood & Iron" – 3:52
2. "Chaos Descends" – 4:55
3. "The Fire" – 3:37
4. "Nadsokor" – 4:43
5. "100 MPH" (Cirith Ungol, Greg Lindstrom) – 3:26
6. "War Eternal" – 5:12
7. "Doomed Planet" – 4:38
8. "One Foot in Hell" – 5:10

== Personnel ==
- Tim Baker – vocals
- Jerry Fogle – guitars
- Michael Vujea – bass
- Robert Garven – drums
