= Paradise Lost (Cirith Ungol album) =

- Cover art by Michael Whelan

Studio album by Cirith Ungol
- Released: August 23, 1991
- Recorded: Gold Mine, Ventura, California
- Genres: Doom metal; power metal
- Length: 47:28
- Label: Restless
- Producer: Ron Goudie

Cirith Ungol chronology
One Foot in Hell (1986)	Paradise Lost (1991)	Servants of Chaos (2001)

Professional ratings
Review scores
Source	Rating
AllMusic	4/5 stars
Metal Reviews	82/100
Rough Edge	3/4 stars

Paradise Lost is the fourth studio album by American heavy metal band Cirith Ungol. It was released on August 23, 1991 by Restless Records in the United States, Canada and Greece, and re-released as a bootleg several times. The band broke up in 1992 over unresolved issues with their new record label. It was finally officially re-released in 2007/08 on Noble Rot.

According to band member Robert Garven:

Restless Records did nothing for the band in the way of promotion or touring. They had me contact Roadrunner Records in Europe (who released our first 2 records) to try to convince them to release Paradise Lost in Europe. The owner, I think was named Cess Wessels or something, refused to release it saying that it was outdated. It is funny as it is the CD that everyone wants and it is still unavailable! I have tried on several occasions to get PL re-released but with no luck. Several companies were very interested in re-releasing it, however Restless Records would never return their phone calls or e-mail.

The album was finally released in the rest of Europe on October 7, 2016 by Metal Blade Records.

== Track listing ==
All songs by Cirith Ungol, except where indicated.

1. "Join the Legion" – 4:32
2. "The Troll" (Joe Malatesta) – 3:50
3. "Fire" (Arthur Brown, Vincent Crane, Mike Finesilver, Peter Ker) – 3:01 (Arthur Brown cover)
4. "Heaven Help Us" (Robert L. Warrenburg) – 6:24
5. "Before the Lash" – 4:39
6. "Go It Alone" – 4:22 (Prophecy cover)
7. "Chaos Rising" – 8:42
8. "Fallen Idols" – 6:45
9. "Paradise Lost" – 6:13

== Personnel ==
Band members

- Tim Baker – vocals
- Jim Barraza – guitars
- Robert L. Warrenburg – bass, vocals
- Vernon Green – bass
- Robert Garven – drums, percussion

Additional musicians

- Joe Malatesta – guitars, vocals

Production

- Produced by Ron Goudie
- Mixed by Robert Feist
