= ...And Death Said Live =

Studio album by Mors Principium Est
- Released: December 5, 2012 (Japan)
- Recorded: Ansa Studio, Finland; The Panic Room, Sweden
- Genre: Melodic death metal
- Length: 46:19
- Label: AFM Records
- Producer: Mors Principium Est; Thomas 'Plec' Johansson

Mors Principium Est chronology
Liberation = Termination (2007)	...And Death Said Live (2012)	Dawn of the 5th Era (2014)

...And Death Said Live is the fourth studio album by Finnish melodic death metal band Mors Principium Est. It was released on December 5, 2012, in Japan.

== Track listing ==
No.	Title	Lyrics	Music	Length
1.	"The Awakening"		Andy Gillion	0:55
2.	"Departure"	Ville Viljanen, Andhe Chandler	Gillion	5:44
3.	"I Will Return"	Viljanen, Chandler	Chandler, Gillion	4:29
4.	"Birth of the Starchild"	Viljanen, Chandler	Gillion	4:12
5.	"Bringer of Light"	Viljanen, Chandler	Gillion	4:16
6.	"Ascension"	Chandler	Chandler	4:30
7.	"...and Death Said Live"		Gillion	2:01
8.	"Destroyer of All"	Viljanen	Gillion	3:57
9.	"What the Future Holds?"	Viljanen	Gillion	5:28
10.	"The Meadows of Asphodel"	Viljanen, Chandler	Gillion	4:24
11.	"Dead Winds of Hope"	Viljanen, Chandler	Gillion	6:23
12.	"The Call (The Backstreet Boys cover)" (Japanese bonus track)			3:30
Total length:				49:49

== Credits ==
=== Musicians ===
- Ville Viljanen – vocals
- Teemu Heinola – bass
- Mikko Sipola – drums
- Andy Gillion – lead guitar
- Andhe Chandler – guitar

=== Guest musicians ===
- Ryan Knight – guitar solo on "Birth of the Starchild"
- Jona Weinhofen – guitar solo on "What the Future Holds?"

=== Production ===
- Thomas 'Plec' Johansson – recording (vocals, guitars, keyboards), mixing, mastering, additional programming
- Teemu Heinola – recording (bass, drums)
- Andy Gillion – programming
