= Cirith Ungol (band) =

American heavy metal band

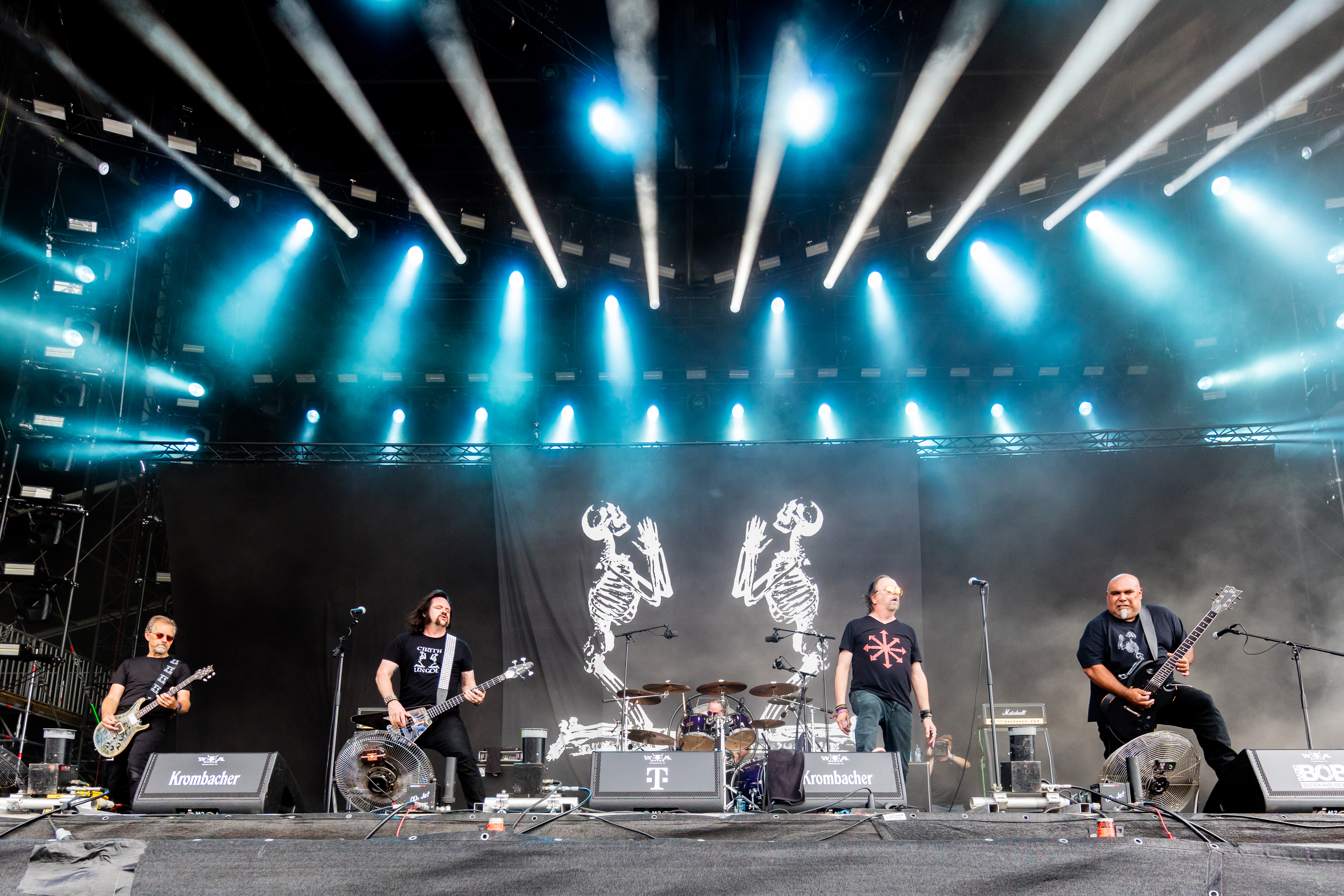
- Cirith Ungol at Wacken Open Air 2022

Background information
- Origin: Ventura, California, U.S.
- Genres: Heavy metal; doom metal; US power metal
- Years active: 1971–1992, 2015–present
- Labels: Metal Blade, Liquid Flames, Restless
- Members: Tim Baker; Robert Garven; Jarvis Leatherby; Armand Anthony
- Past members: Neal Beattie; Greg Lindstrom; Jerry Fogle; Michael Vujea; Jim Barraza; Vernon Green
- Website: truemetal.org/cirithungol

Cirith Ungol is an American heavy metal band formed in late 1971 in Ventura, California. An early doom and power metal group, Cirith Ungol is known for lyrics based on fantasy (particularly sword and sorcery). The band is named after the mountain pass Cirith Ungol in J. R. R. Tolkien's The Lord of the Rings.

Throughout the 1970s, the band played heavy metal rooted in hard and psychedelic rock. Its first studio album, Frost and Fire (1981), featured a heavier sound, regarded as an early example of American power metal. Its second studio album, King of the Dead (1984), solidified its power metal style while gravitating toward a "darker" sound. Many consider the album among the first doom metal releases.

== History ==
=== Early years ===
Drummer Robert Garven (pictured in 1979) is the band's sole continuous member.

Greg Lindstrom, Robert Garven, Jerry Fogle, and Pat Galligan (later a guitarist in Angry Samoans) played in junior high school band Titanic. Wanting to play music similar to Mountain and Grand Funk Railroad, the rest of the band parted with Galligan and founded Cirith Ungol in late 1971.

After forming in late 1971, the band played their first show on January 1, 1972, at an anti-Vietnam War rally.

In 1980, they signed to Liquid Flames Records, and released their first album, Frost and Fire, in 1981, with singer Tim Baker and songs written by bassist and guitarist Greg Lindstrom. Some music journalists described it as "The Worst Heavy Metal Album of All Time".

Their second album, King of the Dead, was released in on July 2, 1984, and contained lyrics primarily written by vocalist Tim Baker and drummer Robert Garven. The album was followed by One Foot in Hell on August 12, 1986, and Paradise Lost on August 23, 1991.

=== Disbandment and inactivity ===
They played their last live show for 25 years on December 13, 1991, and disbanded in 1992, frustrated with their record label.

In 2001, Metal Blade Records released Servants of Chaos in Germany, a compilation album of unreleased demos and live songs. With old tapes and assistance from Lindstrom and Garven, it was an attempt to give fans archival and previously unheard material before the tapes deteriorated beyond retrieval. This double-CD was later re-released worldwide, with a 1984 live DVD recorded at Wolf & Rissmiller's Country Club in California.

Lindstrom joined Falcon, who perform some Cirith Ungol songs. Founding guitarist Jerry Fogle died from liver failure on August 20, 1998.

=== Reunion ===
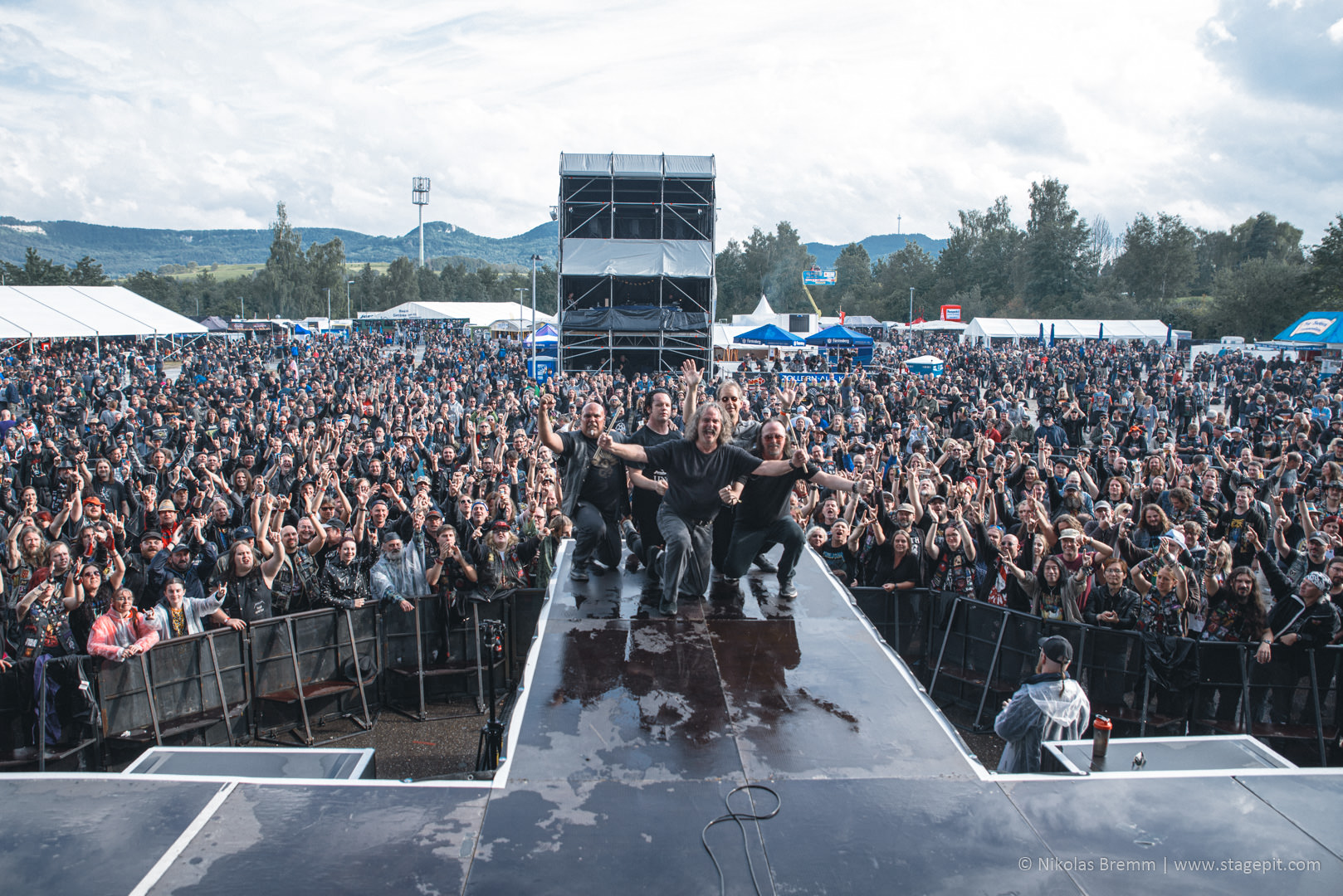
Cirith Ungol in Germany, 2019

In 2015, the band announced they would reform with Tim Baker, Robert Garven, Jim Barraza, and Greg Lindstrom. Their first performance would be on October 8, 2016, at the second annual Frost and Fire Festival in Ventura, California. Throughout 2017, the band headlined and co-headlined several European and US festivals, including Keep It True (Germany), Up the Hammers (Greece), Defenders of the Old (US), Chaos Descends (Germany), Psycho Las Vegas (US), Days of Darkness (US), and Hammer of Doom (Germany). In April 2018, Cirith Ungol performed at the Hell's Heroes Festival in Houston, Texas, and at the NYDM Spring Bash in Milwaukee, Wisconsin.

In August 2018, Cirith Ungol released the single "Witch's Game". The full-length album Forever Black followed in 2020. Another full-length album, Dark Parade, was released on October 20, 2023, and the live album Live at the Roxy on April 25, 2025.

In October 2023, the band announced that they would retire from performing live at the end of 2024. Nonetheless, the band toured South America in 2025, and at the urging of Robert Garven, the band will continue to perform at exclusive live shows. They will release their seventh studio album, All the Shadows, on October 30, 2026.

== Artistry ==
=== Name ===
The band took their name from the mountain pass Cirith Ungol in J. R. R. Tolkien's fantasy novel The Lord of the Rings. The name is Elvish and means "Pass of the Spider". While the place in Tolkien's book is pronounced "kirith ungol", the band pronounced it "sirith ungol". The band said:

Greg Lindstrom and I met at an English Literature class where the teacher was reading Lord of the Rings... and Greg and I read it and it had an influence on our music and feelings. In retrospect I wish we had picked something easier to remember because a lot of our trouble has been over our name. People couldn't pronounce it or remember it, but we figured once they did they wouldn't forget it! We've humorously been called "Sarah's Uncle" and "Serious Uncool," for example!

— Robert Garven

I remember some other possible band names we were considering: Minas Tirith, Khazad Dum, and Uruk Hai, all names from "The Lord Of The Rings". Rob and I both liked J.R.R. Tolkien and Enzo Ferrari, so we knew our songs would cover both those subjects!

— Greg Lindstrom

=== Album cover art ===
Each studio album's cover art is taken from the cover of a DAW Books edition of a book in Michael Moorcock's Elric of Melniboné saga; the art is by Michael Whelan.

== Members ==
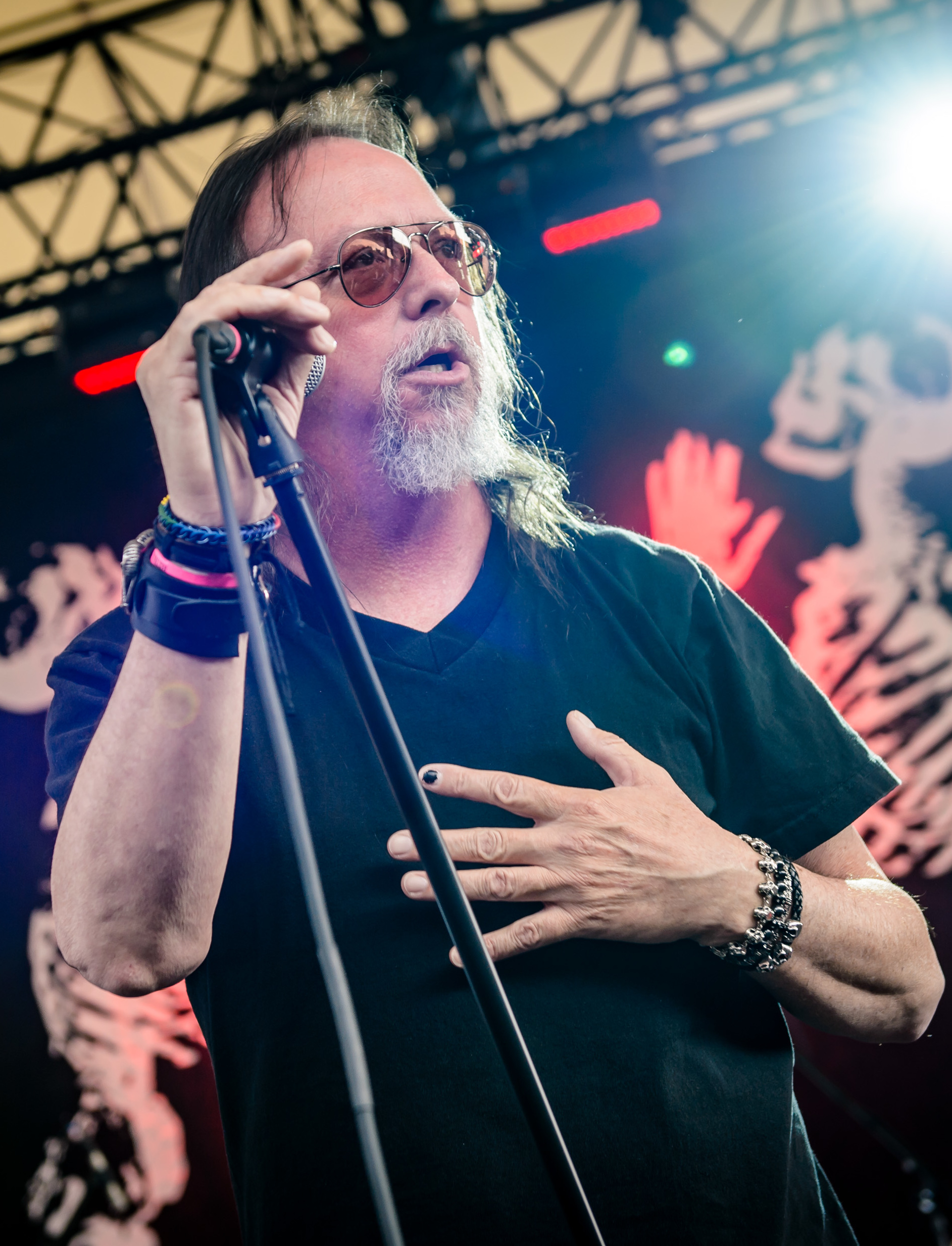
Tim Baker

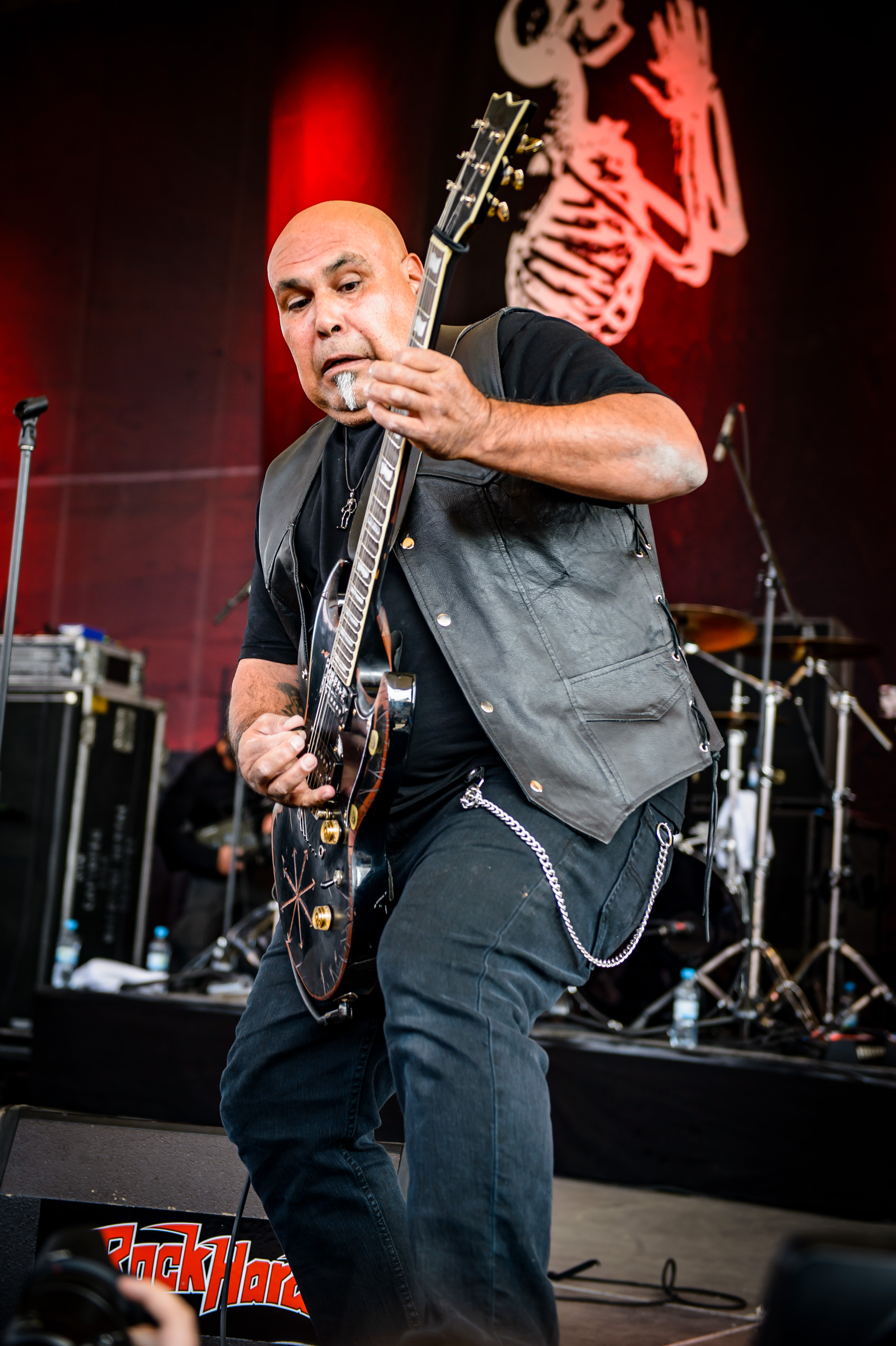
Jim Barraza

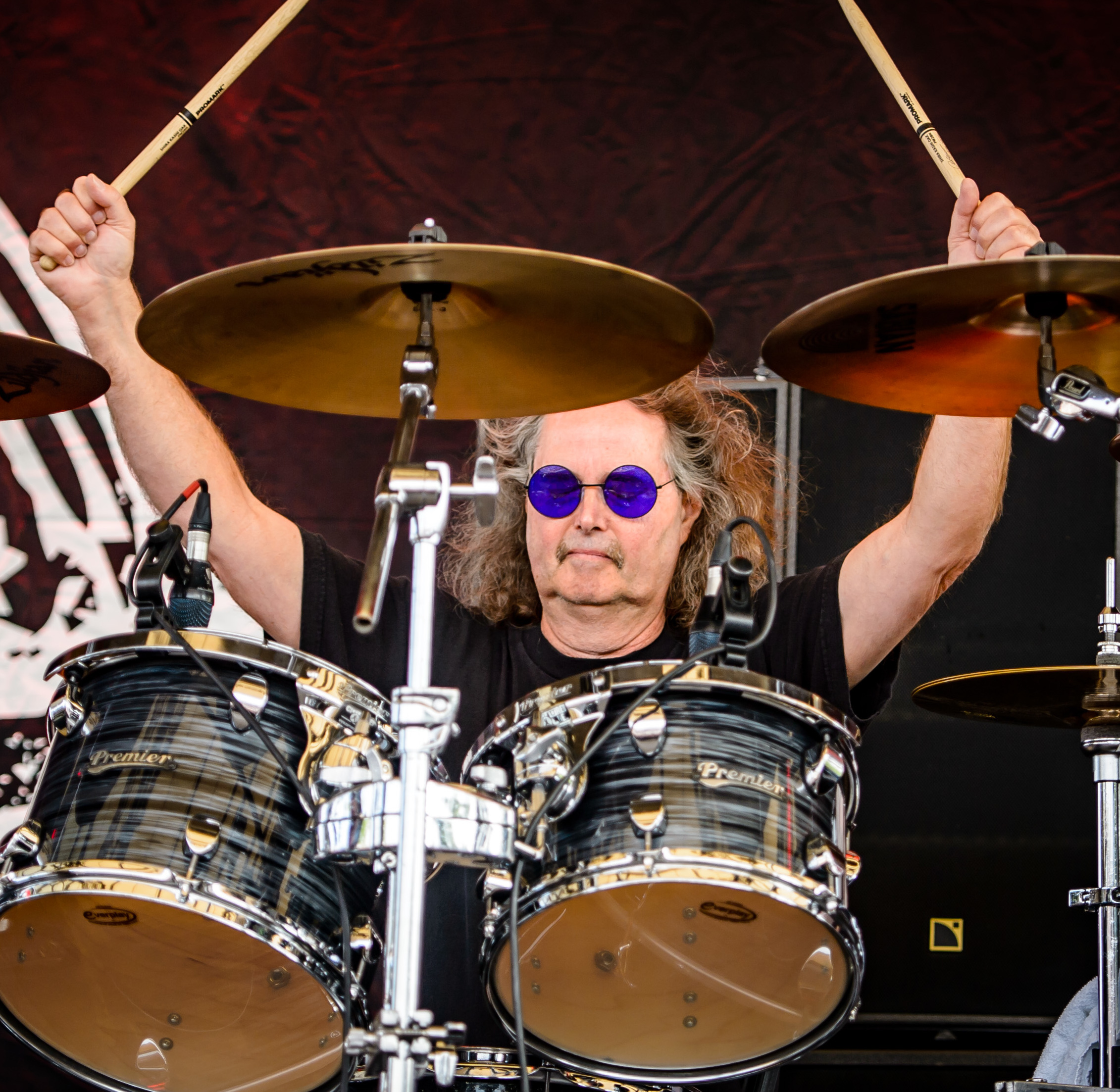
Robert Garven

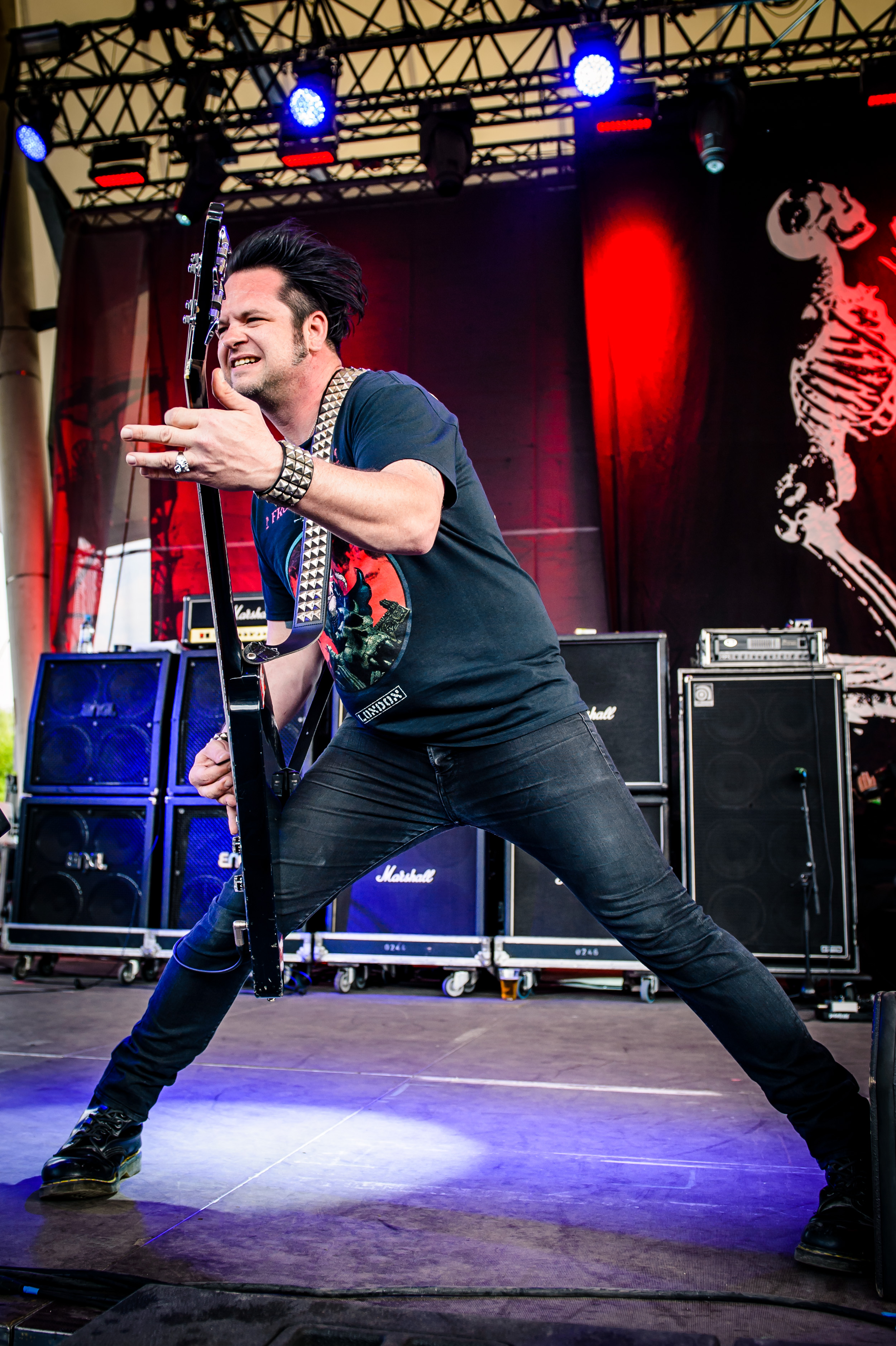
Jarvis Leatherby

=== Current ===
- Tim Baker – lead vocals (1976–1992, 2015–present)
- Armand Anthony – guitars (2024–present)
- Jarvis Leatherby – bass (2015–present)
- Robert Garven – drums (1971–1992, 2015–present)

=== Former ===
- Jerry Fogle – guitars (1971–1987; died 1998)
- Greg Lindstrom – bass (1971–1980), guitars (1981–1982, 2015–2023)
- Neal Beattie – lead vocals (1971–1976)
- Michael "Flint" Vujea – bass (1981–1987)
- Jim Barraza – guitars (1988–1992, 2015–2023)
- Vernon Green – bass (1988–1992)

== Discography ==
=== Albums ===
==== Studio ====
| Year | Album | Album details | Chart performance | | | |
| Year | Album | Album details | US | CAN | GER | SWI |
|---|---|---|---|---|---|---|
| 1981 | Frost and Fire | Released: October 30, 1981; Label: Liquid Flames Records (self-released) | — | — | x | x |
| 1984 | King of the Dead | Released: July 2, 1984; Label: Enigma | — | — | x | — |
| 1986 | One Foot in Hell | Released: August 12, 1986; Label: Metal Blade | — | — | x | — |
| 1991 | Paradise Lost | Released: August 23, 1991; Label: Restless | — | — | — | — |
| 2020 | Forever Black | Released: April 24, 2020; Label: Metal Blade | — | 130 | 11 | 25 |
| 2023 | Dark Parade | Released: October 20, 2023; Label: Metal Blade | — | — | — | — |
| 2026 | All the Shadows | Released: October 30, 2026; Label: No Remorse Records | — | — | — | — |
"—" denotes that the recording did not chart, was not released in that territory, or is uncertified. "×" denotes periods where charts did not exist or were not archived.

==== EPs ====
| Year | Album | Album details | Charts | |
| Year | Album | Album details | US | GER |
|---|---|---|---|---|
| 2021 | Half Past Human | Released: May 28, 2021; Label: Metal Blade | — | — |
"—" denotes that the recording did not chart, was not released in that territory, or is uncertified.

==== Live ====
| Year | Album | Album details | Charts | |
| Year | Album | Album details | US | GER |
|---|---|---|---|---|
| 2019 | I'm Alive | Released: October 25, 2019; Label: Metal Blade | — | 42 |
| 2025 | Live at the Roxy | Released: April 25, 2025; Label: Metal Blade | | |
"—" denotes that the recording did not chart, was not released in that territory or is uncertified.

==== Compilation ====
- Frost and Fire / King of the Dead (One Way; 1995, Canada)
- Servants of Chaos (Metal Blade Records; 2001)

Box set

- The Legacy (Metal Blade Records, 2017)

=== Mixtapes ===
- Untitled demo (Note: Colloquially referred to as "the Orange Album".) (self-released; 1978)

=== Singles ===
- "Witch's Game" (Metal Blade Records; 2018) in the film Planet of Doom
- Brutish Manchild (Metal Blade 2021)

=== Other appearances ===
- Metal Massacre (compilation appearance, 1982)
- The Metal Machine (compilation appearance, 1984)
- Best of Metal Blade, Vol. 2 (compilation appearance, 1988)
- Double Whammy (compilation appearance, 1999)
- Metal Blade 20th Anniversary (compilation appearance, 2002)

=== Bootlegs ===
- Cirith Ungol (bootleg EP, 1979)
- Live (bootleg single, 1996)
