= King of the Dead (album) =

- Cover art by Michael Whelan

Studio album by Cirith Ungol
- Released: July 2, 1984
- Studios: Goldmine Recording Studios, Ventura, California
- Genres: Power metal; doom metal
- Length: 50:17
- Labels: Enigma (US); Roadrunner (Europe)
- Producer: Cirith Ungol

Cirith Ungol chronology
Frost and Fire (1981)	King of the Dead (1984)	One Foot in Hell (1986)

Official audio
- "King of the Dead (Full Album)" on YouTube

Professional ratings
Review scores
Source	Rating
About.com	favorable
AllMusic	2/5 stars
Collector's Guide to Heavy Metal	8/10
Decibel	favorable
Metal Crypt	4/5
Rock Hard	7.5/10

King of the Dead is the second album by the American heavy metal band Cirith Ungol. It was self-produced by the band and released on July 2, 1984 on Enigma Records. It was re-released in September 1999 on Metal Blade Records.

In 2019, Metal Hammer ranked it as the 14th-best power metal album of all time.

== Background and recording ==
Band member Robert Garven said in an interview:

King of the Dead was our best album, the reason was that we had total control over it. Every album could have been this good if we could have exercised complete control over its production and other things. This is the album which I feel is our best effort. The reason the long wait between albums is because when you are financing them yourselves, you have to come up with the money to pay for things like studio time. Plus being on all these independent labels their time tables are slower. I also did all the layout and design of the first three covers, all this while we were all working full-time trying to sponsor the dream.

Guitarist Greg Lindstrom, who left the band in 1982, two years before the release of this album, said: "'Atom Smasher', 'Cirith Ungol' and 'Death of the Sun' were all songs we had written together in the mid 70's, and 'Finger of Scorn' was one of my songs that the band used with my blessing."

== Artwork ==
The cover of Michael Moorcock's novel "Bane of the Black Sword" acts as the album's cover: it is titled "King of the Dead" and was painted by Michael Whelan. The artwork depicts an "undead creature," according to Loudwire.

== Track listing ==
All songs written by Cirith Ungol, except where noted.

Side one

1. "Atom Smasher" (Cirith Ungol, Greg Lindstrom) – 4:12
2. "Black Machine" – 4:16
3. "Master of the Pit" – 7:09
4. "King of the Dead" – 6:49

Side two

1. "Death of the Sun" – 3:54
2. "Finger of Scorn" (Lindstrom) – 8:34
3. "Toccata in Dm" (Johann Sebastian Bach) – 4:37
4. "Cirith Ungol" (Cirith Ungol, Lindstrom) – 6:24

Remastered CD edition bonus track

1. "Last Laugh" (live) – 4:22

== Personnel ==
Cirith Ungol

- Tim Baker – vocals
- Jerry Fogle – guitars
- Michael ("Flint") Vujea – bass
- Robert Garven – drums, percussion

Production

- Tim Nelson – engineer
- Chris Bellman – mastering at Allen Zentz Mastering, San Clemente, California
