= Listenable Records =

French independent record label

- Founded: 1997
- Distributors: Entertainment One (US), Believe Music
- Genre: Hard rock heavy metal death metal black metal grindcore deathcore metalcore
- Country of origin: Boulogne-sur-Mer, France
- Official website: listenable.eu

Listenable Records is an independent officially founded by tape trader and Peardrop fanzine editor Laurent Merle as a company in 1997 in France.

Releasing 7 inch vinyl by bands like Immortal, My Dying Bride, in its early days, Listenable has issued albums from many acclaimed metal bands such as Gojira, Aborted, Textures, Crisix, Thron, Xentrix, Disbelief, Immolation, Devastator, Chemicide, Hellwitch. The label also extended its catalog to heavy metal with acts like Sabïre, Crystal Viper, Leatherwitch, King witch and further to classic rock bands like Electric Mary, Wolf Jaw, Imperial Jade, Jared James Nichols, or My Dynamite, and ventured into doom metal and stoner rock territory with bands from Blood Of the Sun, Mos Generator or Mars Red Sky and more.

In recent years, the label has extended its catalog licensing albums from Warner, BMG Production Music, Universal, Sony, Coroner (band), Manowar, Obituary, Napalm Death, Suffocation, Strapping Young Lad among others.

== Artists ==
- Aaron Buchanan & The Cult Classics
- Abhorrence
- Aborted
- Abscess
- Adagio
- Amaran
- Ancient
- Angtoria
- Anorexia Nervosa
- Armageddon
- Berzerker Legion
- Betraying the Martyrs
- Bloodjinn
- Blind Dog
- Cadaver
- Centurian
- Chemicide
- Crescent (Egypt)
- Crest of Darkness
- Crisix
- Crystal Viper
- Demise
- Deranged
- Destructor
- Devastator
- Devilyn
- Diabolique
- Divine Rapture
- Eternal Evil
- Exhumed
- Gardenian
- General Surgery
- Gojira
- Gorod
- Grief of Emerald
- Hacride
- Hate
- Hellish Outcast
- Horned God
- Immolation
- Incantation
- Jigsore Terror
- Koldborn
- Kruger
- Leatherwitch
- Locus Noir
- Luciferion
- Lyzanxia
- Mahatma
- Marionette
- Monument Of Misanthropy
- Mors Principium Est
- Mutant
- My Diligence
- Nail Within
- Noctiferia
- No Return
- Non Human Level
- Outcast
- Psychedelic Witchcraft
- Reclusion
- Redshark
- Sabïre
- Sarah Jezebel Deva
- Satan
- Saturnalia Temple
- Scarve
- Skyclad
- Soilwork
- Solace
- Speed/Kill/Hate
- Speedslut
- Struck A Nerve
- Submission
- Svart Crown
- Sybreed
- Symbyosis
- Terrifier
- Textures
- The Amenta
- The Eyes of a Traitor
- The Legion
- The Omega Experiment
- The Order of Apollyon
- The Red Shore
- Theory in Practice
- Tyrant (Japanese band)
- Triumphator
- Ultra Vomit
- VELD
- Vile
- Waylander
- Zonaria

== See also ==
- List of record labels
