= Roadwolf =

Austrian heavy metal band

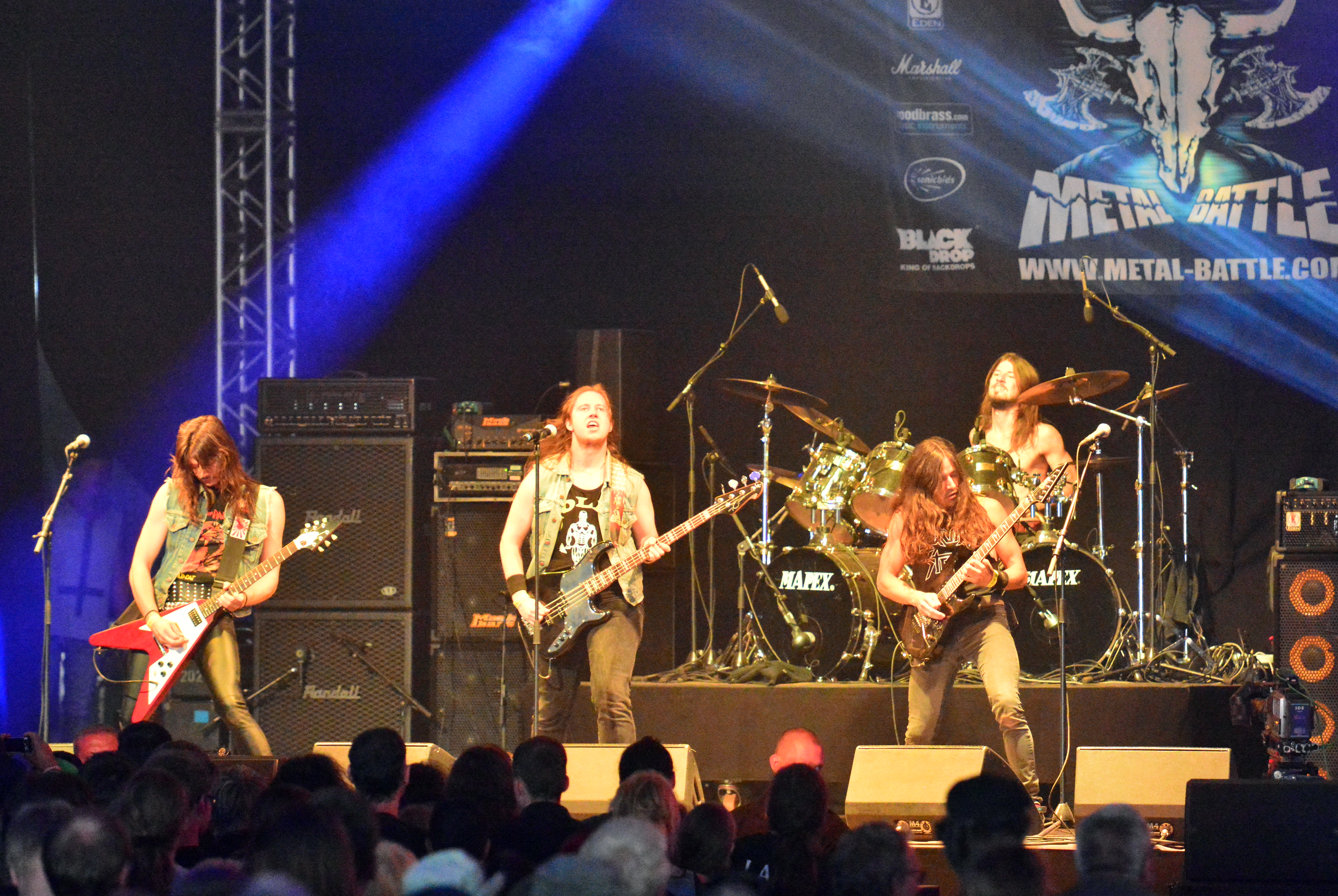
- Roadwolf at the 2014 Wacken Open Air

Background information
- Origin: Wiener Neustadt, Austria
- Genres: Heavy metal; hard rock
- Years active: 2011–present
- Labels: Metalizer Records; Napalm
- Members: Franz Bauer; Valentin Strasser; Christoph Aigner; Emanoel Bruckmüller
- Past members: Felix Keller; Wolfgang Haberl; Jules

Roadwolf is an Austrian heavy metal and hard rock band that is part of the New wave of traditional heavy metal movement. They are currently signed to Napalm Records.

== History ==
Roadwolf was formed in Wiener Neustadt in 2011, and played their very first concert on 6 June in that year.

The band released their debut album, Unchain the Wolf, on 20 January 2021. The debut album established the band's delivery of classic heavy metal with inspiration from legendary heavy metal and hard rock artists of the 1970s and 1980s such as Judas Priest, Saxon, UFO, Dio and Ozzy Osbourne. Since the release of their debut album, Roadwolf has performed at renowned metal festivals such as Wacken Open Air in Germany and shared the stage with notable bands and artists such as Enforcer, Skull Fist, Bullet, Lizzy Borden, Vicious Rumors and Night Demon.

On 17 April 2023, the band announced that they would release their first single from their second studio album, Midnight Lightning. That said album would be released on 19 May 2023.

== Members ==
Roadwolf at Wacken Open Air in Wacken, 30 July 2014

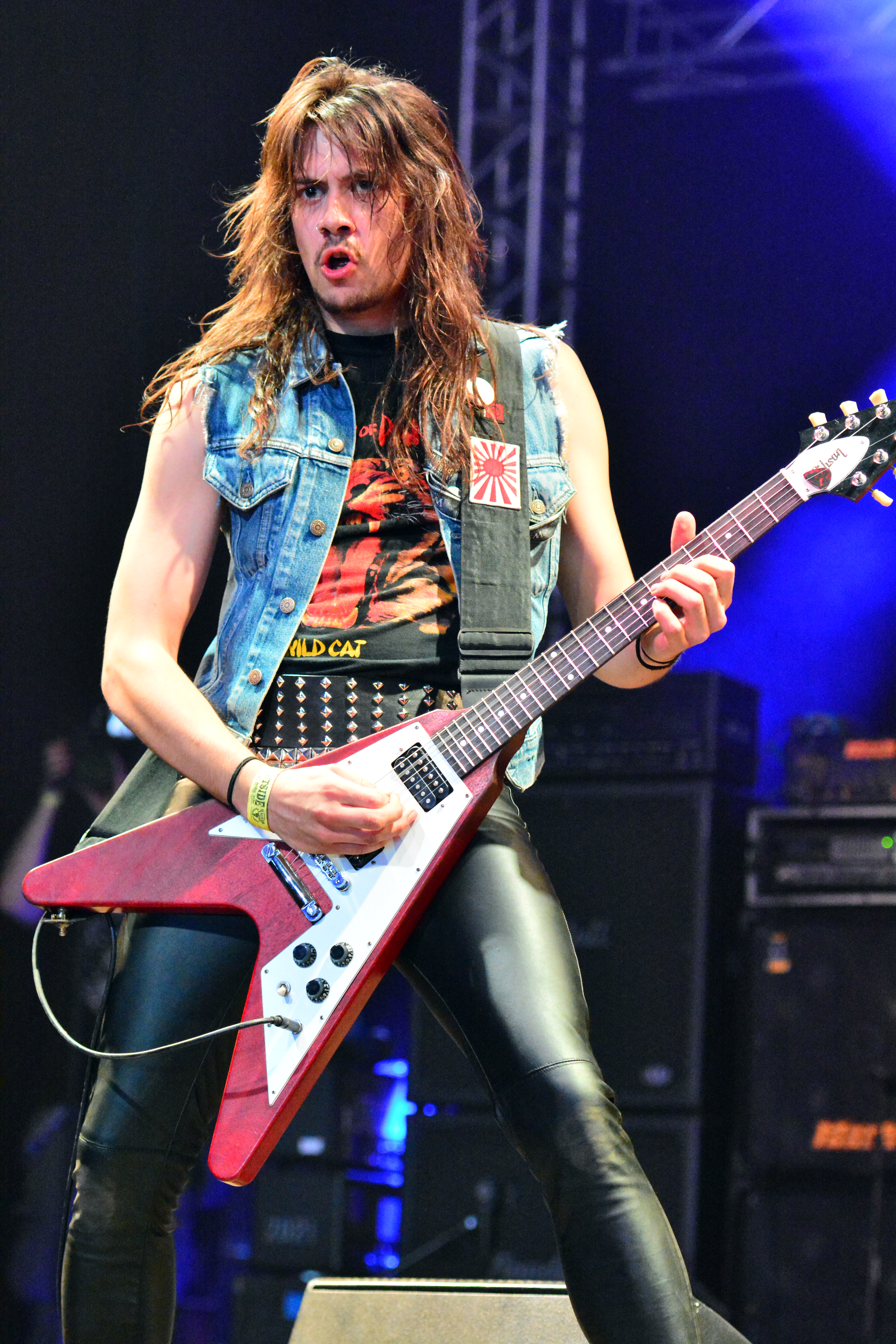
Valentin «Vali» Strasser – guitar

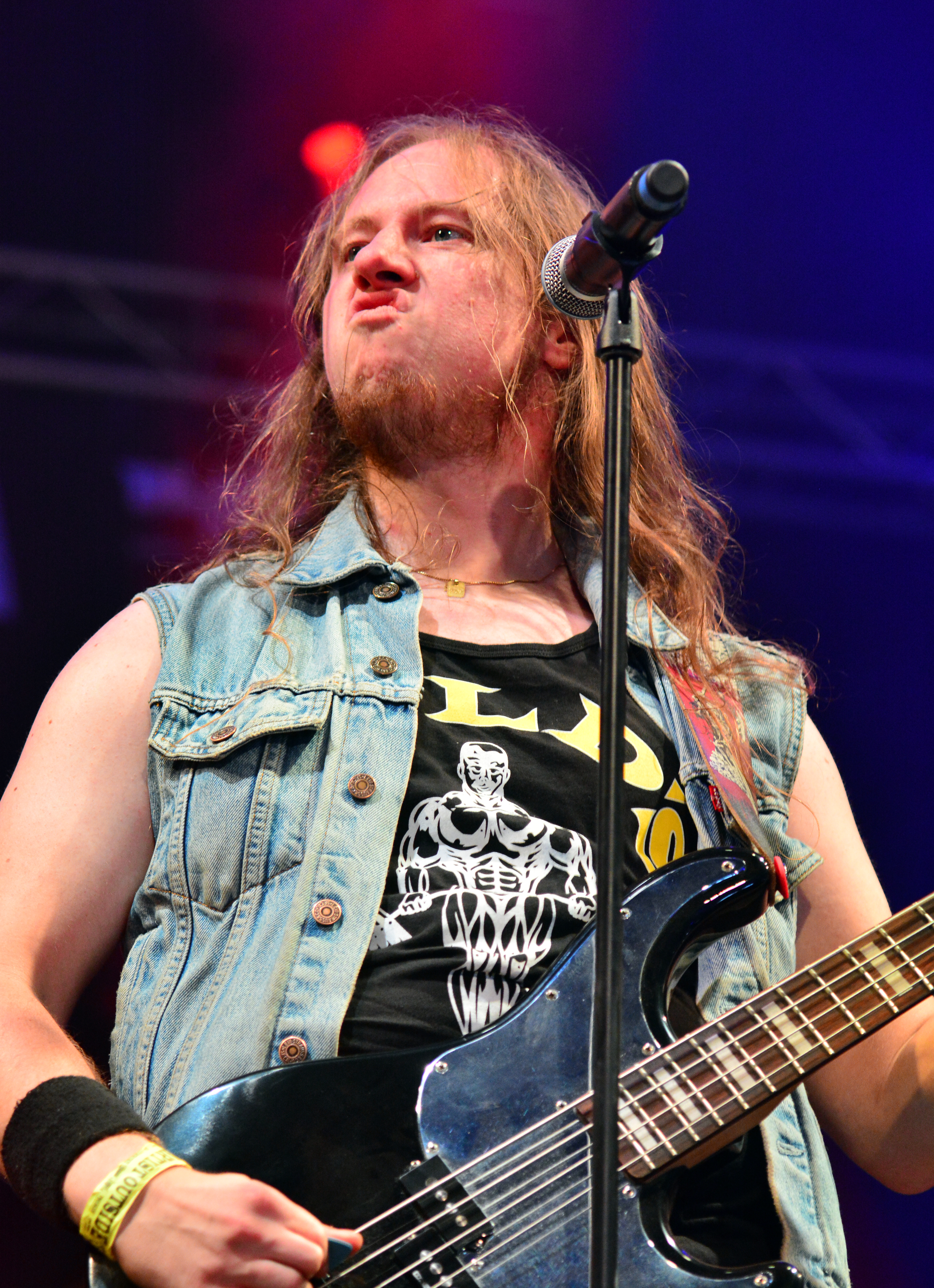
Christoph «Aigy» Aigner – bass, vocals

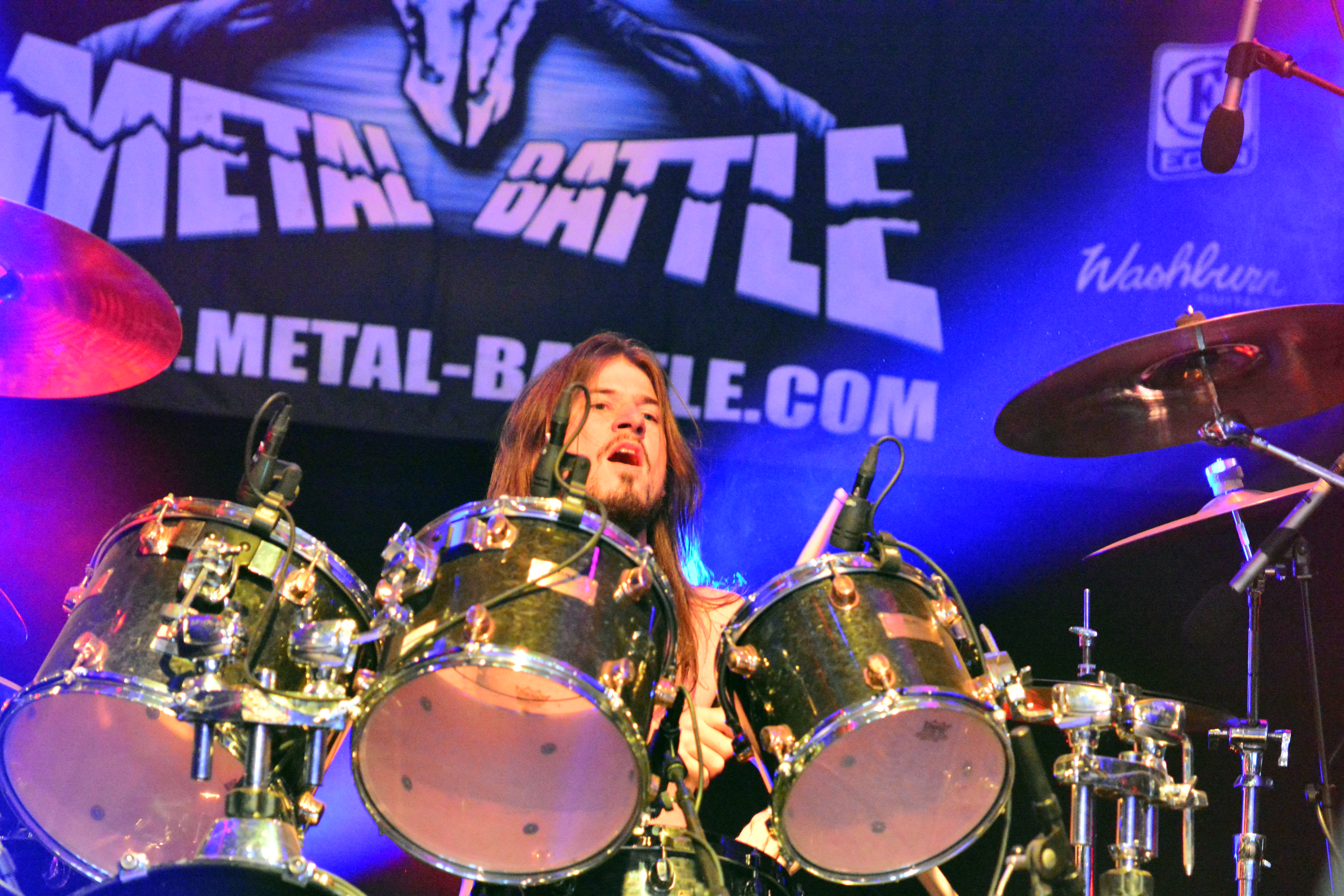
Emanoel «Mano» Bruckmüller – drums

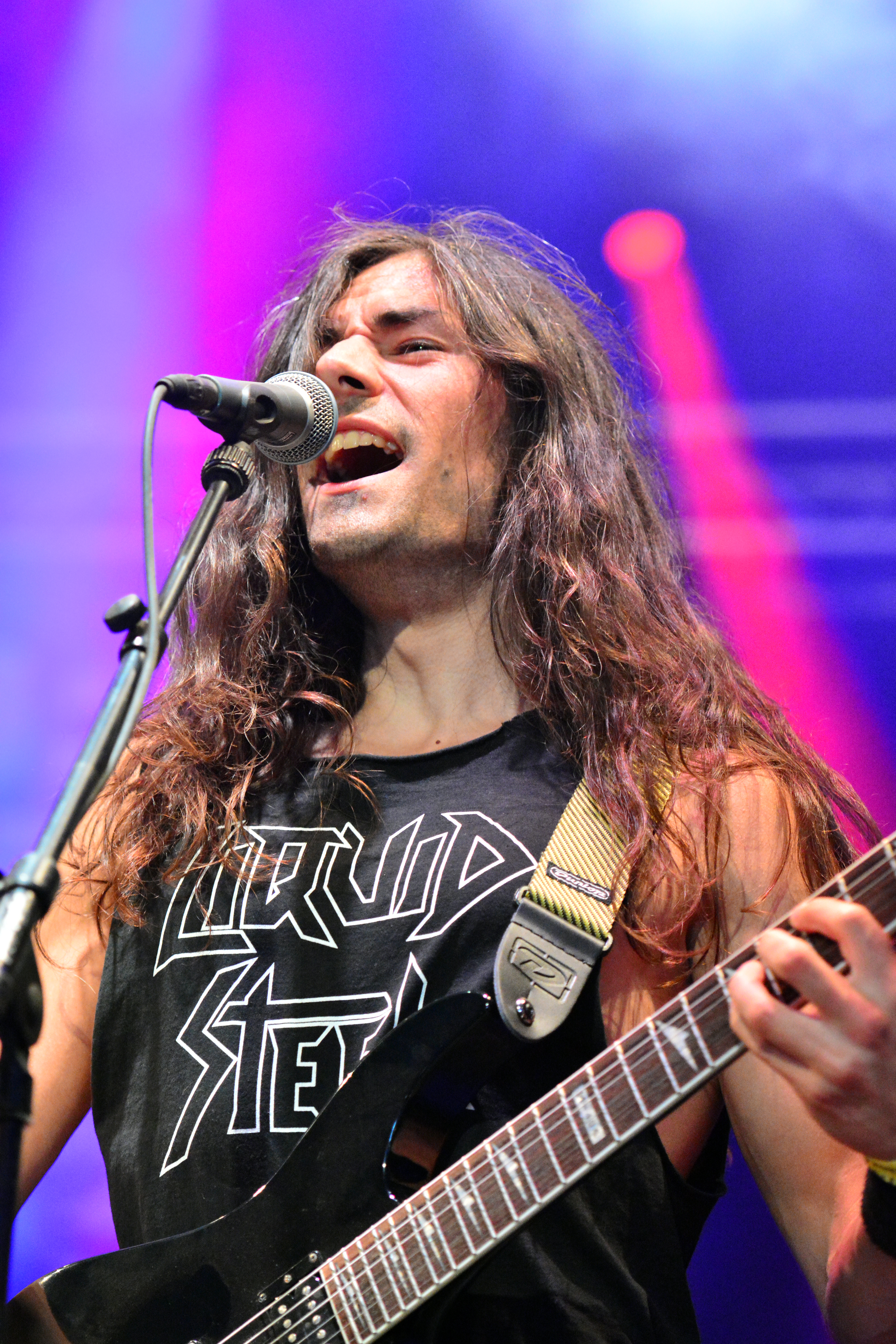
Felix Keller «Johnny Phenix» – guitar

Current

- Franz "Franky" Bauer – lead vocals (2016–present)
- Valentin "Vali" Strasser – guitar, backing vocals (2012–present)
- Christoph "Aigy" Aigner – bass, lead and backing vocals (2011–present)
- Emanoel "Mano" Bruckmüller – drums, backing vocals (2011–present)

Former

- Felix "Johnny Phenix" Keller – guitar (2012–2015)
- Wolfgang "Wolf" Haberl – guitar
- Jules – guitar, backing vocals

== Discography ==
=== Studio albums ===
Year	Title	Label	Ref.
2021	Unchain the Wolf	Metalizer Records	
2023	Midnight Lightning	Napalm Records	

=== Singles ===
Year	Title	Label	Ref
2020	All Hell is Breaking Loose	Independent Records	
2020	Wheels of Fire	Independent Records	
2023	Supernatural	Napalm Records	
