= New wave of traditional heavy metal =

Mid-2000s musical movement

- Stylistic origins: Heavy metal; speed metal; NWOBHM; power metal
- Cultural origins: Mid-2000s
- Typical instruments: Vocals; electric guitar; bass guitar; drums

Other topics
- Heavy metal genres; new wave of classic rock

The new wave of traditional heavy metal (NWOTHM) is a musical movement that started in the mid-2000s as a revival of classic metal sound from the 1970s and 1980s. The term is used to describe bands that make heavy use of the elements and style of that era of metal music.

== Origin ==
The NWOTHM initially started in the mid-2000s with a number of bands, such as Cauldron, Skull Fist, and Enforcer, who began to write and record music that reflected the style and sound of classic heavy metal. These bands combined elements of the metal genres from the '70s and '80s, especially those of the new wave of British heavy metal (NWOBHM), although some bands are also influenced by genres such as speed metal, power metal and hard rock.

While the overall movement's focus was placed on replicating both the sound and success of traditional heavy metal, many of the early NWOTHM bands also incorporated noticeable influence from more melodic mainstream rock and alternative genres. However, by the mid-2010s, the movement took a shift in its creative direction, growing into a substantial underground scene with a less commercial, more gritty sound.

== Characteristics ==
=== Identity and style ===
The NWOTHM takes on a lot of the culture surrounding traditional metal music, as it does with its sound. Attire and appearance typically associated with heavy metal music, such as long hair, leather jackets/vests, and tattoos, are present in the NWOTHM movement. Gestures, movements, and behaviors such as headbanging are also common at concerts and live performances.

=== Lyrical themes ===
The lyrical themes found in the music of NWOTHM bands can vary greatly, but often include themes of fantasy, war, the supernatural, and the occult. These elements take on dark and sometimes aggressive undertones, and are not typically lighthearted in nature; the music often puts emphasis on lyrics that deal with "dark and depressing subject matter to an extent hitherto unprecedented".

=== Musical elements ===
In line with its identity as a revival of traditional metal, the NWOTHM combines and incorporates elements of speed metal, power metal, and the NWOBHM It makes use of distorted guitars with music largely built around melodies and guitar riffs. Power chords see heavy use, and songs usually have instrumental bridges and guitar solos. Drumming is typically loud and dense, with fast and steady beats. The vocals are essential to the heavy metal sound; in the case of the NWOTHM, vocals are almost exclusively clean, and like in most traditional heavy metal, are loud, intense and powerful. Open display of emotion through the tone of the vocals is considered to be an essential piece of the musical quality, sometimes said to be more important to the music than the lyrics themselves.

== Bands ==
NWOTHM bands include:

- Black Moor
- Cauldron
- Crystal Viper
- Diemonds
- Enforcer
- Eternal Champion
- Grand Magus
- Haunt
- Icarus Witch
- Kryptos
- Night Demon
- Redshark
- Roadwolf
- Skull Fist
- Sons of Lioth
- Spirit Adrift
- Striker
- Tailgunner
- White Wizzard
- Wolf
- Wytch Hazel

== See also ==
- New wave of American heavy metal
- New wave of classic rock
