= Into the Night =

Into the Night may refer to:

== Film, television and radio ==
- Into the Night (1985 film), an American film starring Michelle Pfeiffer and Jeff Goldblum
  - B.B. King "Into the Night", a 1985 documentary film including the video for B. B. King's song "Into the Night", written for the above feature film
- Into the Night (1928 film), a 1928 American film starring Agnes Ayres
- When Night Falls or Into the Night, a 1985 Israeli film featuring Assi Dayan
- Into the Night, a 1980s/1990s UK radio programme presented by Nicky Campbell
- Into the Night with Rick Dees, 1990s late-night TV show hosted by Rick Dees
- Into the Night (TV series), a 2020 Belgian television series

== Music ==
- Into the Night (Son of Sam album), 2008
- Into the Night (The Monotones album), 2015
- Into the Night (Enforcer album), 2008
- Into the Night, a 2008 album by Fixmer/McCarthy
- Into the Night (EP), a 2012 EP by The Raveonettes
- "Into the Night" (Benny Mardones song), 1980
- "Into the Night" (Santana song), 2007
- "Into the Night" (Yoasobi song), 2021, the English version of "Yoru ni Kakeru"
- "Into the Night", a song by Ace Frehley from Frehley's Comet
- "Into the Night", a song by the Cat Empire
- "Into the Night", song by HIM from the album Tears on Tape
- "Into the Night", a song by Julee Cruise from Floating into the Night
- "Into the Night", a song by Super Furry Animals from Hey Venus!
- "Into the Night", a song by Sweet from Sweet Fanny Adams
- "Into the Night", a song by Timothy B. Schmit from Timothy B
