= Tailgunner (band) =

English heavy metal band

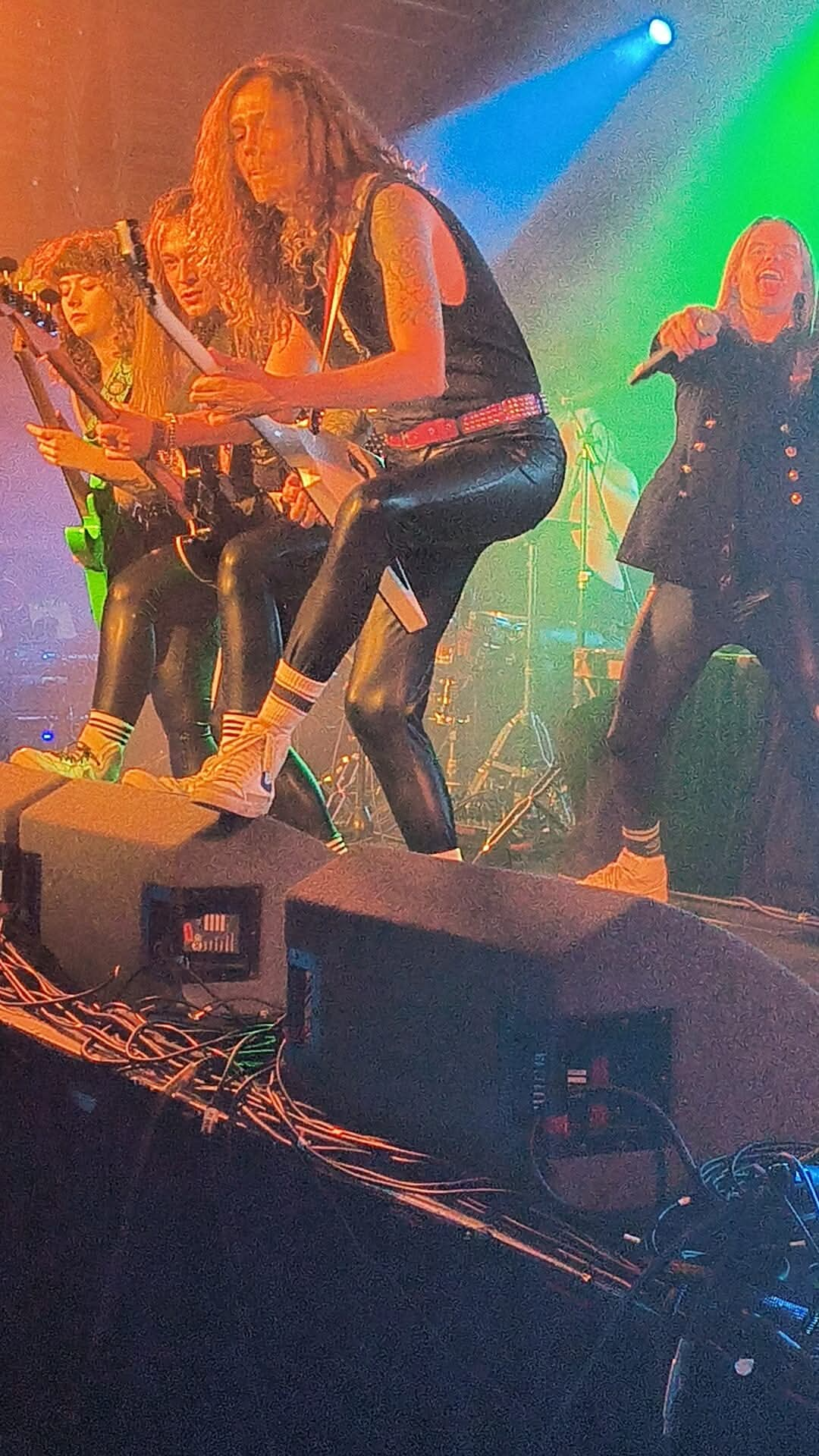
- Tailgunner in August 2024.

Background information
- Origin: England
- Genres: Heavy metal, N.W.O.T.H.M., power metal
- Years active: 2022–present
- Labels: Fireflash Records; Napalm Records
- Members: Thomas Hewson: Craig Cairns; Zach Salvini; Eddie Mariotti
- Past members: Patrick Van Der Völlering; Sam Caldwell; Jani Pasanen; Rhea Thompson
- Website: tailgunnerhq.myshopify.com

Tailgunner are an English heavy metal band conceptualised in 2018 and officially formed by January 2022 by bassist Thomas Hewson. The band released their debut album, Guns for Hire, in 2023. In addition to Hewson, the current line-up consists of lead vocalist Craig Cairns, guitarist Zach Salvini and drummer Eddie Mariotti.

== History ==
Bassist Thomas Hewson formed the band Tailgunner over a period of two years, starting in 2018. He utilized social media and demos he had created, reaching out to musicians across Europe and jamming with various players to assemble the group. The band's name was inspired by the Iron Maiden song of the same title.

Tailgunner's musical influences are rooted in classic NWOBHM bands like Iron Maiden, Judas Priest, and Motörhead. It is also important to note that although Tailgunner's origins date back to 2018, they identify as having officially formed as Tailgunner on New Year's Day of 2022. The band's 2022 EP Crashdive featured former members of the band Midnight Prophecy, including drummer Sam Caldwell, guitarist Zach Salvini, and vocalist Craig Cairns. The EP was produced by Olof Wikström of Enforcer. In 2022, Tailgunner also undertook their 'Hell's Vagabonds' UK tour, which took place between June and July.

In 2023, the band underwent significant changes. Guitarist Patrick Van Der Völlering was fired after four years with Tailgunner. Rhea Thompson (ex-Rïot-Eye) initially stepped in to support live gigs in May 2023 and was officially made a permanent member as a co-lead guitarist in August 2023. Hewson expressed the opinion that this change was beneficial, with Rhea's energetic stage presence and commitment revitalizing the band, from his viewpoint.

In addition, on July 6, 2023, Tailgunner supported KK's Priest for the band's live debut in Wolverhampton, alongside ex-Iron Maiden singer Paul Di'Anno; this was a notable event in the band's history.

The band's debut album, Guns for Hire, was released on July 14, 2023 via Fireflash Records, and charted at #50 on the UK independent album charts.

By January 2024, drummer Sam Caldwell had parted ways with Tailgunner due to personal circumstances, and in February 2024, Finnish drummer Jani Pasanen (ex-Asomvel) was announced as Caldwell's replacement. Pasanen joined the band just in time for their 'Guns for Hire' tour, which included dates supporting U.D.O. and Riot V across the UK and Europe.

This was a significant period for the band, as they were also preparing for more live shows, including an August 2024 tour alongside Armored Saint in the UK.

Drummer Jani Pasanen departed the band on good terms at the end of 2024, with Eddie Mariotti joining the band on drums in April 2025.

In May 2026, the band announced that unspecified allegations had been made against Hewson, who was stepping away temporarily while the allegations were investigated. Thompson also announced her departure from the band in May 2026 citing unspecified "moral and ethical" concerns while stating that she had been frozen out of the band without communication.

== Members ==
Current

- Thomas "Bones" Hewson – bass guitar, backing vocals (2022–present; on hiatus: 2026)
- Craig Cairns – lead vocals (2022–present)
- Zach Salvini – guitar (2022–present)
- Eddie Mariotti – drums (2025–present)

Past

- Patrick Van Der Völlering - guitar (2022–2023)
- Sam Caldwell - drums (2022–2024)
- Rhea Thompson - guitar (2023–2026)

== Discography ==
=== Extended plays (EPs) ===
- Crashdive (2022)

=== Studio albums ===
- Guns for Hire (2023)
- Midnight Blitz (2026)

== See also ==
- List of heavy metal bands
- New wave of traditional heavy metal
