= Sail On =

Sail On may refer to:

- Sail On (Imperials album) or the title song, 1977
- Sail On (Muddy Waters album), 1969; originally The Best of Muddy Waters, 1958
- Sail On: The 30th Anniversary Collection, a 2004 album by Kansas
- Sail On, a 1996 album by Dick Gaughan
- "Sail On" (song), a 1979 song by the Commodores
- "Sail On", a song by Masterplan from their self-titled album, 2003
- "Sail On", a song by Enforcer from their Zenith, 2019

== See also ==
- "Sail On! Sail On!", a 1952 short story by Philip José Farmer
