= Nostalgia (Enforcer album) =

Studio album by Enforcer
- Released: May 5, 2023
- Recorded: 2020–2022
- Studio: Hvergelmer Studios, Arvika, Värmland, Sweden
- Genre: Heavy metal
- Length: 41:38
- Label: Nuclear Blast
- Producer: Olof Wikstrand, Rikard Löfgren

Enforcer chronology
| Zenith (2019) | Nostalgia (2023) |

Professional ratings
Review scores
| Source | Rating |
|---|---|
| Dead Rhetoric | 9.5/10 |
| Distorted Sound | 6/10 |
| Ghost Cult Magazine | 7/10 |

Nostalgia is the sixth album by Swedish heavy metal band Enforcer was released on 5 May 2023 through Nuclear Blast Records. The album was produced by Rikard Löfgren, and its cover artwork was made by Adam Burke. Music videos were made for the songs "Coming Alive" and "Metal Supremacia".

== Track listing ==
| No. | Title | Length |
|---|---|---|
| 1. | "Armageddon" | 0:38 |
| 2. | "Unshackle Me" | 3:38 |
| 3. | "Coming Alive" | 3:12 |
| 4. | "Heartbeats" | 4:42 |
| 5. | "Demon" | 3:07 |
| 6. | "Kiss of Death" | 3:26 |
| 7. | "Nostalgia" | 3:53 |
| 8. | "No Tomorrow" | 3:09 |
| 9. | "At the End of the Rainbow" | 3:20 |
| 10. | "Metal Supremacía" | 2:50 |
| 11. | "White Lights in the USA" | 2:42 |
| 12. | "Keep the Flame Alive" | 3:27 |
| 13. | "When the Thunder Roars (Cross Fire)" | 3:34 |
| Total length: | | 41:38 |

== Personnel ==
- Olof Wikstrand – guitars, vocals
- Jonathan Nordwall – guitars
- Garth Condit – bass
- Jonas Wikstrand – drums, keyboards, piano
