= Head of the Pack =

Studio album by Skull Fist
- Released: 26 August 2011
- Recorded: 2011 in Toronto, Canada
- Genre: Heavy metal
- Label: NoiseArt Records
- Producer: Dan Tsourounis

Skull Fist chronology
Heavier Than Metal (2010)	Head of the Pack (2011)	Chasing the Dream (2014)

Head of the Pack is the debut album by Canadian heavy metal band Skull Fist. It was recorded in 2011 at Phase One Studios/Lenz Entertainment and released on 26 August 2011 by NoiseArt Records and distributed online by Nuclear Blast, distributed by Napalm Records in North America, and released by Spiritual Beast Records in parts of Asia. The album received positive reviews, which led the band to be named best upcoming band in Terrorizer in early 2012. After leaving the band, Alison Thunderland recorded the drums for the album.

== Track listing ==
No.	Title	Length
1.	"Head of the Pack"	3:45
2.	"Ride the Beast"	3:40
3.	"Commanding the Night"	3:36
4.	"Get Fisted"	4:08
5.	"Cold Night"	3:04
6.	"Tear Down the Wall"	2:53
7.	"Commit to Rock"	4:29
8.	"Ride On"	4:43
9.	"Like a Fox"	3:55
10.	"No False Metal"	4:38
11.	"Attack Attack"	3:07

== Personnel ==
- Zach Slaughter – vocals, guitar
- Casey Slade – bass
- Jonny Nesta – guitar
- Alison Thunderland – drums
