= Cauldron (band) =

Canadian heavy metal band

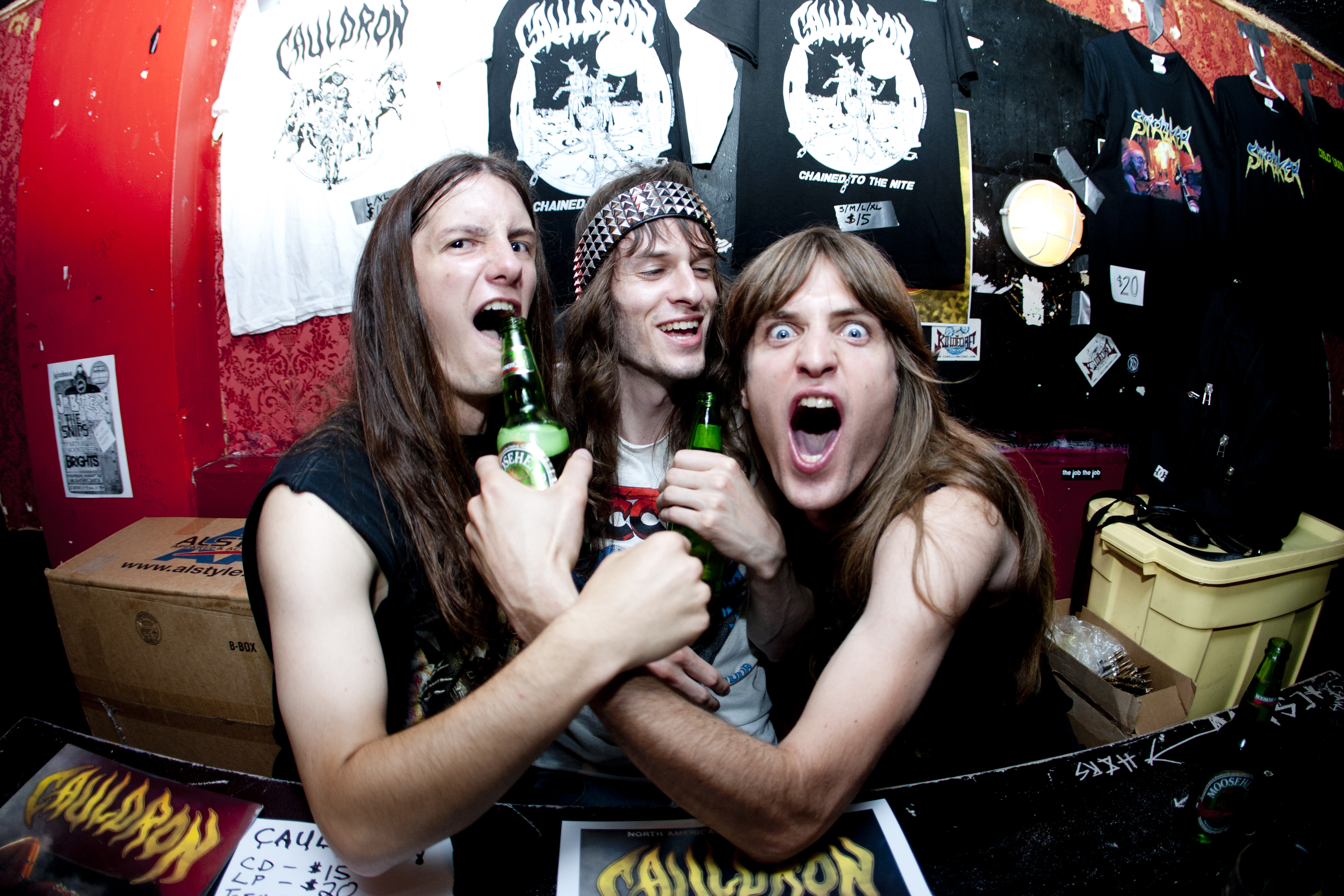
- Cauldron in 2009

Background information
- Origin: Toronto, Ontario, Canada
- Genres: Heavy metal
- Years active: 2006–present
- Label: Earache Records
- Members: Jason Decay; Ian Chains; Myles Deck
- Past members: Al "Artillery" Chambers; Steelrider; Chris Rites; Chris Stephenson

Cauldron is a Canadian heavy metal band formed in 2006 in Toronto following the breakup of Goat Horn, with guitarist Brandon Wars leaving to form a new band, Zuku. Cauldron consists of Jason Decay on vocals and bass guitar, Ian Chains on guitar and Myles Deck on drums.

== History ==
=== Formation and debut album ===
Less than a year after formation, the band released its first EP, Into The Cauldron, with New Iron Age/Iron Kodex Records (Germany), and it was received positively by the metal press, which led to the band touring across Canada. In 2008, the band signed with Earache Records and began to record its first album. Around this time, the original drummer, Al Artillery, left the band to join Relapse Records' Toxic Holocaust, and the position was filled briefly by Steelrider, the original drummer of Goat Horn. He was replaced by Kïll Cheerleadër/Zuku/Crystal Castles drummer, Chris Rites. The band's first album, Chained to the Nite, was released in April 2009 and the band toured the UK with Wolf in support of the album. Cauldron's song "Restless" was used in a DC Shoes video of the professional skateboarder Danny Way.

=== Touring and second album 2010–2011 ===
After the release of Chained to the Nite, drummer Steelrider left the band and was replaced by Chris Stephenson of the Canadian band Aggressor. The band spent most of 2010 playing gigs and touring and then began to work on a second album, Burning Fortune, which was released on February 14, 2011.

=== Tomorrows Lost 2012–2015 ===
In December 2011, the band's drummer, Chris Stephenson, left the band and the former one, Chris Rites, temporarily returned for the recording of Tomorrow's Lost, the band's third studio album, released on October 8, 2012, by Earache Records.

In July 2012, Cauldron announced Myles Deck as the new drummer.

=== In Ruin 2016-present ===
In January 2016, the band released its fourth album, In Ruin. The album was voted the "release of the month" by readers of Loudwire.com.

The band played at the Hell's Heroes music festival held in Houston in March 2024.

== Musical style ==
Cauldron is considered a part of the new wave of traditional heavy metal, an ongoing movement that has seen the return of traditional-sounding metal bands, similar to the Swedish glam metal revival. The name is taken from the new wave of British heavy metal, with which the movement strongly identifies. Other bands considered part of the movement include White Wizzard, Enforcer, Skull Fist, Steelwing and Sons of Lioth.

== Band members ==
=== Current ===
- Jason Decay – lead vocals, bass (2006–present)
- Ian Chains – guitars, backing vocals (2006–present)
- Myles Deck – drums, backing vocals (2012–present)

=== Former ===
- Al Artillery – drums (2006–2008)
- Chris Rites – drums (2008–2009, 2012)
- Steel Rider – drums (2008)
- Chris Stephenson – drums (2009–2011)

== Discography ==
=== Studio albums ===
- Chained to the Nite (2009)
- Burning Fortune (2011)
- Tomorrow's Lost (2012)
- In Ruin (2016)
- New Gods (2018)

=== EPs ===
- Into the Cauldron (2007)
- Moonlight Desires (2014)

== Videography ==
- "Chained Up In Chains" (2009)
- "All or Nothing" (2011)
- "Nitebreaker" (2012)
- "Summoned to Succumb" (2014)
- "Live over Lee's" (2014) (VHS)
