= Redshark =

Spanish heavy metal band

- Origin: Barcelona, Spain
- Genres: Heavy metal; speed metal; NWOTHM; power metal
- Years active: 2012–present
- Labels: Listenable, Iron Oxide
- Website: https://redsharkmetal.bandcamp.com

Redshark is a Spanish heavy metal band, founded in 2012 which originated in Barcelona. The band is often referred to as being in the NWOTHM movement.

== Musical style ==
Redshark's musical style has been described as heavy metal, power metal, NWOTHM, and, especially often, speed metal. In an interview, their guitarist Philip Graves stated:

"Many many many influences… We love a lot of music genres. This EP is very influenced by US Power Metal bands like Metal Church, Savatage, Vicious Rumors, Lääz Rockit… Speed Metal bands like Exciter, Razor, first Helloween, first Running Wild… But each one of us listens so much music. For example I also like Death Metal, Black thrash, AOR, Disco, Disco Funk, Southern Rock… Javi is a very fan of 50s Rock ’n’ Roll, Synthwave, Stoner, Doom…, Pau also likes 90s Punk, Mark likes Modern Metal and Chris likes Black Metal or Sleazy… We aren’t closed minds for listening music though we play Speed/Power Metal."

== Discography ==
- 2016 - Rain of Destruciton (EP)
- 2019 - Evil Realm (EP)
- 2022 - Digital Race (LP)
- 2025 - Sudden Impact (LP)

== Members ==
=== Current ===
- Philip Graves - Guitar (2012–Present)
- Javier Bono - Guitar (2013–Present)
- Chris Carrest - Bass (2016–Present)
- Pau Correas - Vocals (2019–Present)
- Alan - Drums (2023–Present)

=== Former ===
- Mark Striker - Drums (2012–2022)
- Eric Martinez (aka Eric Killer) - Drums (2022–2023)
