= Steve Pollick =

Steve Pollick is a heavy metal guitarist. He is a former member of White Roses and Icarus Witch, and is now an active member of the band Order of Nine.
