= New wave of classic rock =

Style of rock music

- Stylistic origins: Hard rock; blues rock; psychedelic rock
- Cultural origins: 2000s–2010s, United States and United Kingdom

New wave of classic rock, also known as classic rock revival, is a style of rock music that is meant to emulate the sound of earlier rock acts, particularly those of the 1960s, 1970s and 1980s.

== Characteristics ==
Classic rock revival bands perform in a style influenced by the sounds of the popular rock sounds of the 1960s, 1970s and 1980s, including hard rock, psychedelic rock, blues rock, progressive rock and glam rock. Some revival bands aim emulate earlier sounds while other groups incorporate contemporary elements into their sound. Brad Angle has described the sound as "hard-hitting, swaggering, riff-driven rock 'n' roll built around a core vocal-guitar-bass-drum configuration".

== History ==
The genre first emerged as a commercial force within mainstream rock during the early 2010s with groups such as Rival Sons, which formed in 2009. By the mid-2010s, the success of Greta Van Fleet saw a slew of other rock bands performing in a classic rock-influenced sound gain prominence. Other groups identified as part of this movement include the Struts, Dirty Honey, Dorothy, Crown Lands, Goodbye June, Tyler Bryant & the Shakedown, White Reaper, Joyous Wolf, Thunderpussy, Nick Perri, and Larkin Poe. The movement began to form in the early 2010s, before fully emerging around 2018.

The revival of glam rock was particularly prominent in the movement, with Classic Rock magazine crediting the Struts, the Lemon Twigs, Diane Coffee, Starbenders, Temples, and Ty Segall as "bands bringing glam rock into the future" Groups including Måneskin, Palaye Royale, and Starcrawler merged elements of more contemporary styles of pop and hip hop into the framework of classic rock. Måneskin, in particular, were credited as the band "saving" rock music by publications including Guitar Player, America Oggi and Rolling Stone.

== See also ==
- New wave of traditional heavy metal
- New wave of British heavy metal
- Garage rock revival
- New wave of American heavy metal
