= Death by Fire (album) =

Studio album by Enforcer
- Released: February 1, 2013
- Recorded: 2012
- Studio: Hvergelmer Studios
- Genres: Heavy metal, speed metal
- Label: Nuclear Blast
- Producers: Olof Wikstrand, Jonas Wikstrand

Enforcer chronology
Diamonds (2010)	Death by Fire (2013)	From Beyond (2015)

Professional ratings
Review scores
Source	Rating
Team Rock	2.5/5 stars
Blabbermouth.net	7/10 stars
Rock Hard	8/10 stars
Metal-Hammer.de	3/7 stars

Death by Fire is the third album by Swedish heavy metal band Enforcer. It was released on February 1, 2013, through Nuclear Blast.

== Track listing ==
No.	Title	Length
1.	"Bells of Hades"	0:28
2.	"Death Rides This Night"	3:37
3.	"Run for Your Life"	3:21
4.	"Mesmerized by Fire"	4:02
5.	"Take Me Out of This Nightmare"	4:59
6.	"Crystal Suite" (instrumental)	3:55
7.	"Sacrificed"	5:35
8.	"Silent Hour / The Conjugation"	6:30
9.	"Satan"	4:00
Total length:		36:27

== Personnel ==
- Olof Wikstrand – vocals, rhythm guitar, lead guitar
- Joseph Tholl – lead guitar
- Jonas Wikstrand – drums
- Tobias Lindqvist – bass
