= Into the Cauldron =

EP by Cauldron
- Released: March 2007
- Genre: Heavy metal
- Length: 18:31
- Label: Basement Metal
- Producer: Cauldron

Cauldron chronology
Into the Cauldron (2007)	Chained to the Nite (2009)

Into the Cauldron is the first extended play release by the Canadian heavy metal band Cauldron.

== Track listing ==
No.	Title	Length
1.	"The Striker Strikes"	3:45
2.	"Into the Cauldron"	4:32
3.	"Restless"	5:35
4.	"Torture's Too Kind"	4:39
5.	"Axe Cross"	4:27
6.	"Making Noise And Drinking Beer (Tyrant Cover)"	3:35
Total length:		26:33

== Reception ==
The EP received a positive review from Blabbermouth.net with a rating of 7.5/10.

== Personnel ==
- Jason Decay - vocals, bass guitar
- Ian Chains - guitar
- Al Chambers - drums
