= Sons of Lioth =

Belgian heavy metal band

- Origin: Herenthout, Belgium
- Genres: Heavy metal, hard rock, power metal
- Years active: 2005–present
- Members: Kristof Vandenbergh; Danijel Cecelja; Ben Cavens; Davy Van Bel; Tim Van Herck
- Website: sonsoflioth.be

Sons of Lioth are a Belgian heavy metal band from Herenthout.

== History ==
Sons of Lioth was founded in 2005 by guitarists Sublimo and Supremo. The band released a 5-song demo in 2006 titled Destination Earth. At first, it received a positive response and saw a good review in Mindview. In 2009, they released a full album called Legends. The tracks Spartacus and Last Unicorn were included, as well as a live version of Raise your fist and a bonus track Wrecking Ball. The band split up shortly thereafter in 2010 for unknown reasons. Unable to promote their new album, it was tucked away for a select audience. In 2013 they released a new EP named Large Hadron Collider Spider featuring five new tracks, including the title song. The EP got a good review on metalstorm and one from infernal masquerade, saying 'this EP is by far better than most of the mainstream Heavy Metal that was produced in the last 10 years'.

== Musical style ==
Sons of Lioth's most recognizable features are the strong lead vocals, easy-listening arrangements and guitar solos. They are considered a part of the new wave of traditional heavy metal (NWOTHM) an ongoing movement that in recent years has seen the return of traditional sounding metal bands (similar to the Swedish glam metal revival) the name is taken from the new wave of British heavy metal in which the movement strongly identifies with. Other bands considered part of the movement include White Wizzard, Enforcer and Cauldron.

== Discography ==
- Destination Earth (2006)
- Legends (2009)
- Large Hadron Collider Spider (2013)
- Judge Hammer (2015)
