= Goat Horn =

Canadian heavy metal band

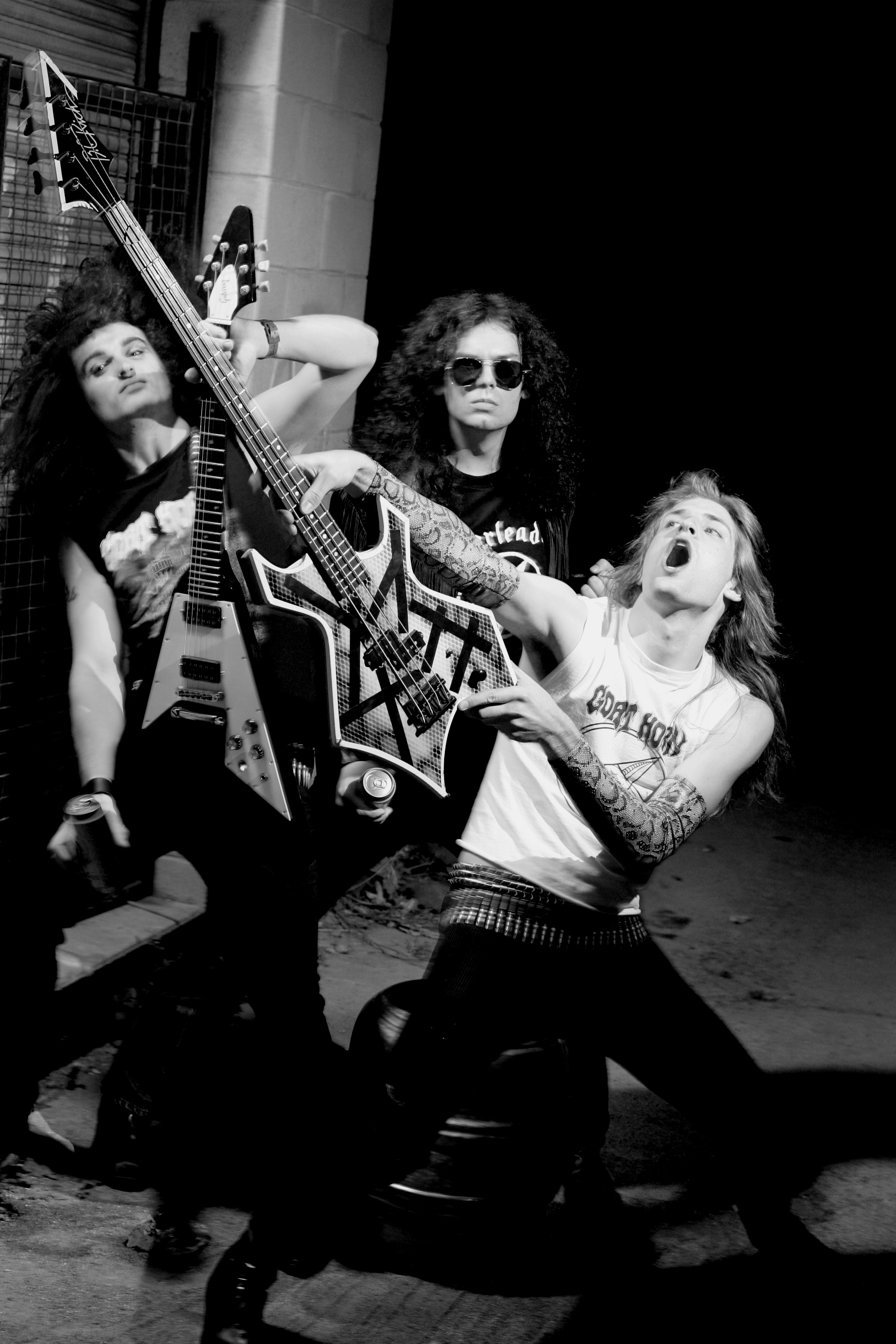
- Goathorn 2003 (L-R: Brandon Wars, Steel Rider, Jason Decay)

Background information
- Origin: Pembroke, Ontario, Canada
- Genres: Heavy metal, doom metal
- Years active: 1999–2006, 2011
- Labels: October 32nd
- Past members: Jason Decay; Brandon Wars; Steel Rider
- Website: goathorn.com

Goat Horn was a Canadian heavy metal band founded in Pembroke, Ontario in 1999. The band was composed of Jason Decay (vocals / bass), Brandon Wars (guitar) and Steel Rider (drums). Decay, Wars, and Rider had all been in and out of bands on the local scene before forming Goat Horn. What began as a jam of Cathedral and Judas Priest covers quickly developed into a serious project. Their music was influenced by ground-breaking metal bands such as Venom, Raven, Eudoxis (Canadian thrash metal pioneers), and Celtic Frost.

With the release of their 2001 debut, Voyage To Nowhere, Goat Horn became the main focus and priority of each member's musical endeavors. This album was recorded in a one-day session in February 2001. In September 2001, they relocated to Toronto in order to gain more exposure. The majority of 2002 was spent touring Ontario, Quebec, and the northern United States.

In December 2002, the band re-entered the studio to prepare their second release. In June 2003, Storming The Gates was released. The band's last studio release was entitled Threatening Force, and it was released in 2005. Goat Horn disbanded in June 2006. Since its break-up, Jason Decay has continued his heavy metal vision with his new band Cauldron, using demos he recorded for Goat Horn's fourth release as the basis of his new band's material. Decay temporarily joined long-time friends in Kïll Cheerleadër and also filled in on bass in Thor. Brandon Wars formed Zuku, with the drummer from Kïll Cheerleadër, Chris Rites. Kïll Cheerleadër finished in 2007.

== Discography ==
- 2001 Voyage to Nowhere
- 2003 Storming the Gates
- 2005 Threatening Force
