= From Beyond (Enforcer album) =

Studio album by Enforcer
- Released: February 27, 2015
- Recorded: August–November 2014
- Studio: Necromorbus Studios
- Genres: Heavy metal, power metal
- Length: 42:41
- Label: Nuclear Blast
- Producer: Enforcer

Enforcer chronology
Death by Fire (2013)	From Beyond (2015)	Zenith (2019)

Professional ratings
Review scores
Source	Rating
AllMusic	3.5/5 stars
Metal-Hammer.de	5/7 stars
BW&BK	8.0/10 stars
Rock Hard	8.0/10 stars

From Beyond is the fourth album by Swedish heavy metal band Enforcer was released on February 27, 2015 through Nuclear Blast.

== Track listing ==
No.	Title	Length
1.	"Destroyer"	3:41
2.	"Undying Evil"	3:53
3.	"From Beyond"	3:22
4.	"One with Fire"	2:52
5.	"Below the Slumber"	6:21
6.	"Hungry They Will Come"	4:32
7.	"The Banshee"	4:17
8.	"Farewell"	4:12
9.	"Hell Will Follow"	3:19
10.	"Mask of Red Death"	6:12

== Japanese bonus tracks ==
No.	Title	Writer(s)	Length
11.	"Bursting Out"	Venom	2:35
12.	"I Turned into a Martian"	Danzig	1:37
13.	"Mean Machine"	Kilmister, Burston, Campbell, Gill	2:52

== Personnel ==
- Olof Wikstrand – vocals, rhythm guitar, lead guitar
- Joseph Tholl – lead guitar
- Jonas Wikstrand – drums
- Tobias Lindqvist – bass

== Charts ==
Chart (2015)	Peak position
German Albums (Offizielle Top 100)	84
Belgian Albums (Ultratop Flanders)	173
