= Night Demon (band) =

American heavy metal band

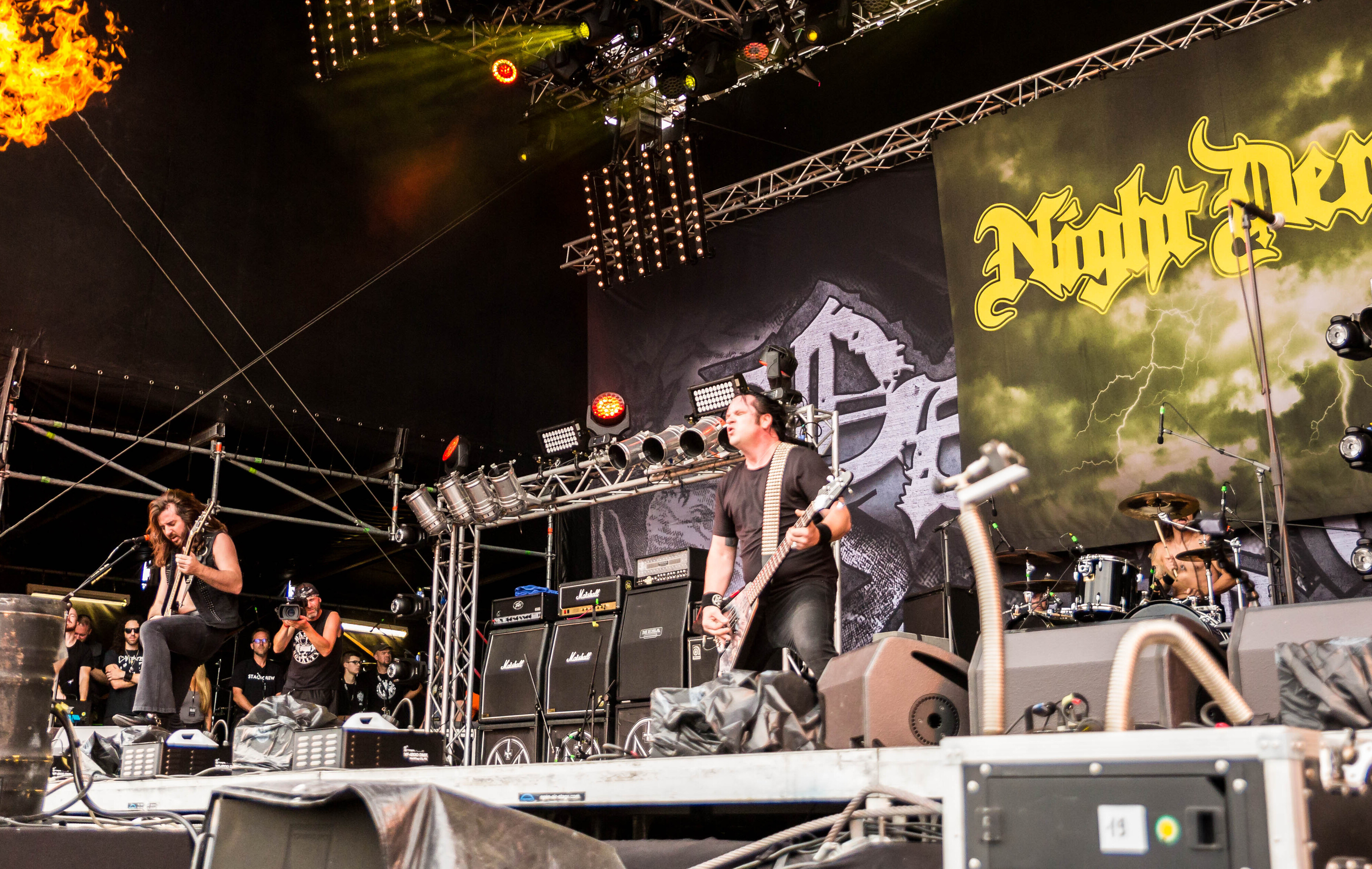
- Night Demon at Party.San Metal Open Air 2019

Background information
- Origin: Ventura, California, U.S.
- Genres: Heavy metal; NWOTHM
- Years active: 2011–present
- Labels: Century Media; SPV/Steamhammer; Shadow Kingdom; High Roller; Reinig
- Members: Jarvis Leatherby; Armand John Anthony; Brian Wilson
- Past members: Brent Woodward; Patrick Bailey; John Crerar; Dustin Squires
- Website: nightdemon.net

Night Demon is an American heavy metal band from Ventura, California. Performing as a power trio, the band originated from the movement in the 2010s spearheading the resurgence of traditional, old-school heavy metal. Night Demon has released three studio albums on independent record labels, plus a compilation album and a triple-live album recording. The band tours extensively, and regularly performs at venues and heavy metal festivals all around the world.

== History ==
=== Beginnings and Night Demon EP (2011–2014) ===
Night Demon was formed by vocalist/bassist Jarvis Leatherby and guitarist Brent Woodward in May 2011.

The Night Demon EP was released on June 18, 2013 in 7" vinyl format (500 copies) via Reinig Records. Two months later, Shadow Kingdom Records issued a CD edition of the EP. The Night Demon EP was well received by the underground heavy metal press; according to a Blabbermouth.net review, the tracks would appeal to existing fans of vintage headbanger music and also attract some new listeners to the genre.

In September 2013, Night Demon retained Pennsylvania transplant Dusty Squires (formerly of the band New Liberty) as drummer. A month later, the band performed three shows in Santa Ana, Los Angeles and Las Vegas with NWOBHM bands Raven and Diamond Head. In April 2014, Night Demon made their first festival appearance at the Ragnarokkr Metal Apocalypse in Chicago, Illinois. On April 23, 2014, the band embarked on a six-week, 31-show European tour, starting in Cologne, Germany and including appearances at Keep It True Festival (Germany), Pounding Metal Festival (Spain), and Muskelrock Festival (Sweden).

Night Demon was the guest band on Raven's seven-week "ExtermiNation America Tour 2014" in October and November 2014. During this time, the band's live shows included nightly appearances by the band's mascot "Rocky", the hooded skeletal goblet-wielding figure from the cover of the Night Demon EP; since then, Rocky's appearance onstage during "The Chalice" has become a regular event during Night Demon performances.

=== Curse of the Damned (2015–2016) ===
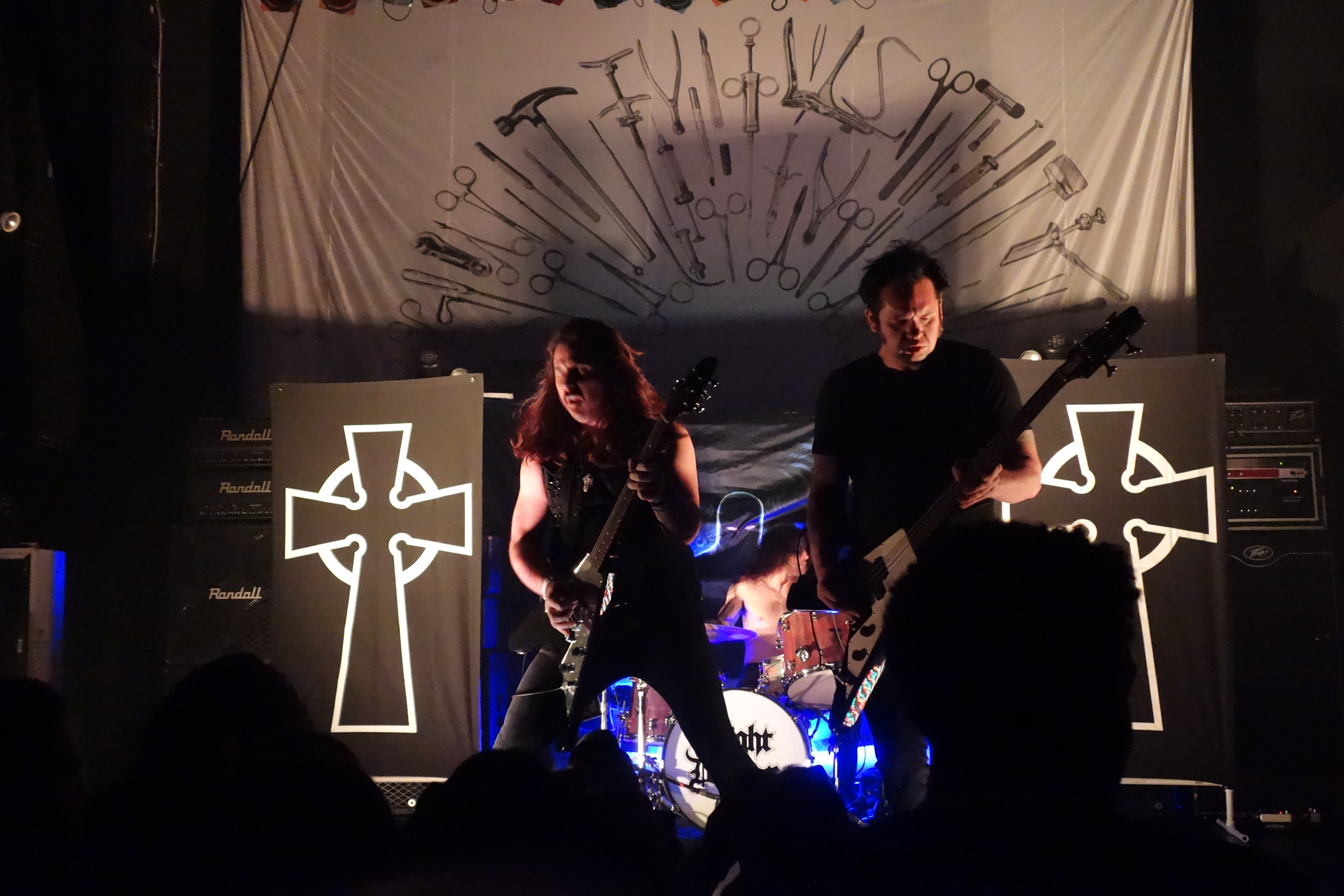
Night Demon performing in New York City in 2016

Night Demon's full-length debut album, Curse of the Damned, was released in January 2015 on SPV in Europe and on Century Media Records in the rest of the world. The album garnered many favorable reviews, and was voted the #1 album of 2015 by listeners of the WJCU Metal on Metal radio show.

Guitarist Brent Woodward parted ways with Night Demon in January 2016. His replacement, Armand John Anthony, had served as a studio engineer on both the Curse of the Damned album and the debut EP. He had previously played with Night Demon drummer Dusty Squires in New Liberty and he had played drums for Night Demon as a last-minute fill-in for a show at the Old Towne Pub in Pasadena, California in 2013.

The new Night Demon lineup continued touring internationally in support of Curse of the Damned. They performed about 100 shows in 2016 and early 2017, including "Final Curse" tours of the United States with Utah band Visigoth, concerts in Europe in which they performed Curse of the Damned in its entirety, a slot on the Carcass / Crowbar / Ghoul tour of the US in summer 2016, appearances at Germany's Bang Your Head!!! Festival, a second appearance at their hometown Frost & Fire Festival, and a 19-show South American tour.

=== Darkness Remains (2017–2018) ===
Night Demon's second album, Darkness Remains, was released in April 2017 on SPV in Europe and on Century Media Records in the rest of the world. The album was preceded by the singles "Welcome to the Night" (with an accompanying music video) and "Hallowed Ground." A 7" vinyl single for "Black Widow" was also issued, backed with a cover version of Black Sabbath's "Turn Up the Night". Darkness Remains was released to positive reviews from the worldwide heavy metal press, including monthly soundcheck rankings of #1 in Deaf Forever magazine and #3 in Hard Rock. The German Metal Hammer magazine praised Darkness Remains and recommended the album to fans of early music by Iron Maiden, Jaguar, and Tygers of Pan Tang.

Night Demon played more than 100 shows around the world in 2017 in support of Darkness Remains. Highlights included a spring US tour supporting Anvil, a spring European tour dubbed "Darkness Over Europe", a November tour of the UK and Ireland (Darkness over U.K.&Ireland), and appearances at festivals in Europe and the US, including Ozzfest (California), Rock Hard Festival (Germany), Summer Breeze Open Air (Germany), Party San (Germany), Keep It True (Germany), Very 'Eavy (Netherlands), Pounding Metal (Spain), Up the Hammers (Greece), Muskelrock (Sweden), Headbangers Open Air (Germany), Chaos Descends (Germany), Defenders of the Old (New York), Days of Darkness (Maryland), and Frost & Fire (California). Night Demon closed out the year with a headlining appearance at the Cleveland Metal Holiday Food Drive in Cleveland, Ohio in December. The show was recorded in front of a large crowd at The Beachland Ballroom and was released as a triple-live album, Live Darkness, in August 2018 via Century Media Records/Shadow Kingdom Records in the US and SPV in Europe.

In September 2017, the German Metal Hammer magazine presented Night Demon with an award for best "Up & Coming" band. The Metal Hammer awards show received substantial international media coverage. Darkness Remains was named album of the year in magazines such as Deaf Forever and Rocks!, and Night Demon again earned the top spot in the WJCU Metal on Metal Listeners Poll for 2017.

In 2018, Night Demon toured Europe for five weeks in January and February 2018 as part of Accept's "The Rise of Chaos" tour. That summer they went on the European festival circuit, including return engagements at the Rock Hard Festival and the Bang Your Head!!! Festival in Germany, and Muskelrock in Sweden, as well as their debut appearance at the Wacken Open Air Festival, the largest heavy metal festival in the world.

=== Live Darkness (2018–2020) ===
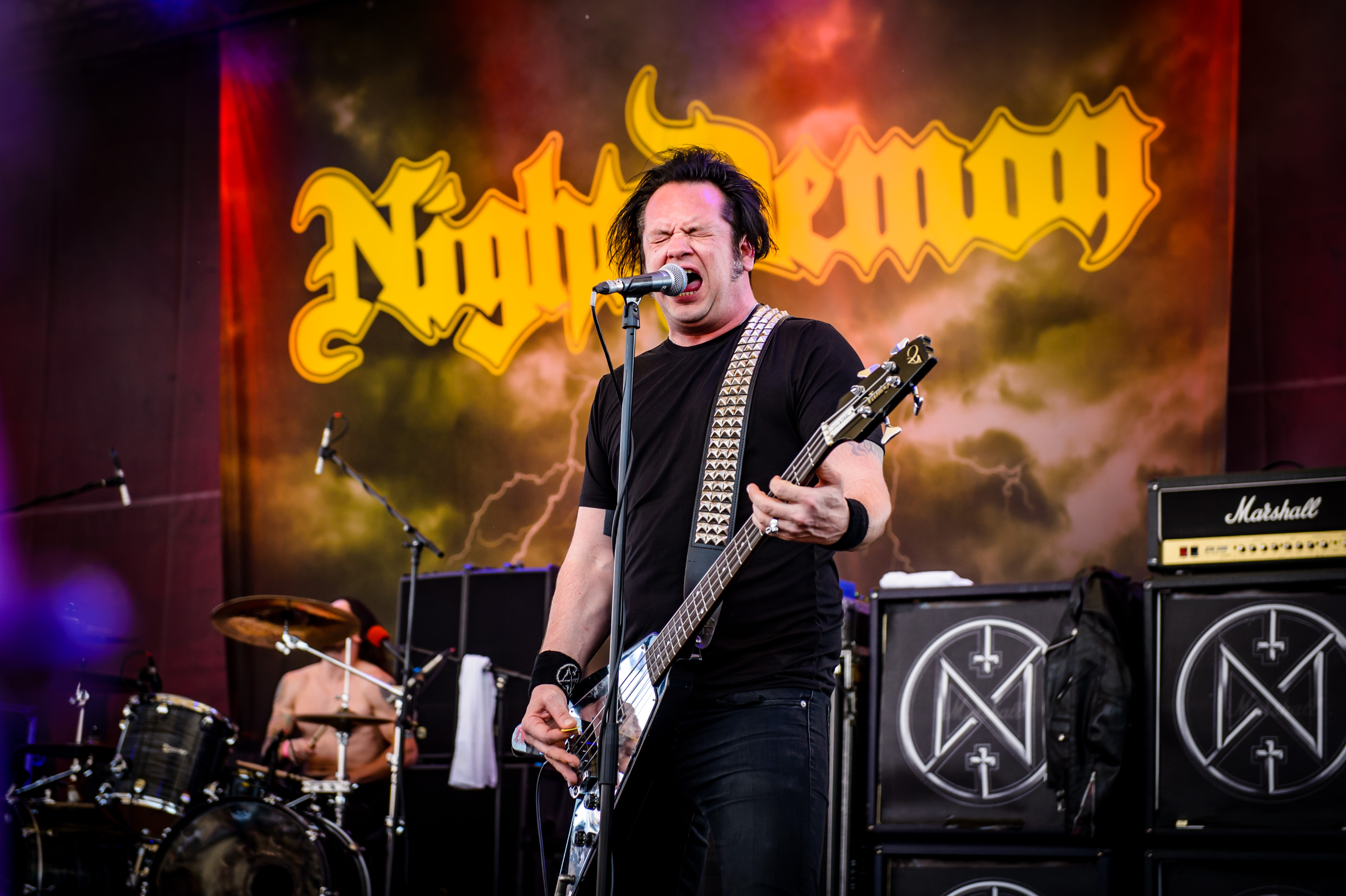
Night Demon at RockHard Festival 2018 in Germany

Following the release of the Live Darkness album in summer 2018, Night Demon embarked on extensive tours of the United States and Europe, then played a series of one-off shows in both North America and Europe. On November 30, 2018, the band performed at the Decibel Magazine festival pre-party at the legendary Troubadour nightclub in West Hollywood, California, supporting Armored Saint. On December 21, 2018, Night Demon played the "Another Death Angel Xmas" show with Bay Area thrash veterans Death Angel at the famed Slim's venue in San Francisco, California.

On February 2–3, 2019, Night Demon played a pair of shows aboard the Independence of the Seas cruise ship as part of the 70000 Tons of Metal Festival traveling between Ft. Lauderdale and Haiti. On March 2, 2019, the band headlined the Hell Over Hammaburg festival at the Markthalle Hamburg in the city of Hamburg, Germany. At this special show, former Scorpions guitarist Uli Jon Roth joined Night Demon on stage for an encore consisting of "In Trance" and "Top of the Bill" from the Scorpions' 1975 In Trance album. In November and December 2019, Night Demon conducted a five-week tour of Europe supporting Sacred Reich on their tour for their album, Awakening.

In spring 2020, Night Demon released their first new music in three years. On April 3, 2020, the band released a new single called "Empires Fall", featuring a cover of "Fast Bikes" by obscure NWOBHM band Le Griffe as the B-side. On May 8, 2020, Night Demon released a second single entitled "Kill the Pain", with the B-side being a cover of Cirith Ungol song "100 mph". During the spring and summer of 2020, three more strictly limited 7" singles followed: "Are You Out There" (b/w Thin Lizzy cover "The Sun Goes Down") released on June 5, 2020; "Vysteria" (b/w Iron Maiden cover "Wasted Years") released on July 3, 2020; and "In Trance" (Scorpions cover b/w "Top of the Bill" both recorded live with Uli Jon Roth) released on August 7, 2020.

=== Year of the Demon (2022) ===
All five of the 2020 7" singles sold out almost instantly. Many diehard fans were unable to obtain physical copies. And none of the B-sides of these singles were ever released on digital/streaming platforms. To bring these songs to a wider audience, Night Demon released a compilation album entitled Year of the Demon via Century Media Records worldwide on March 25, 2022, in various physical and digital formats. Year of the Demon collects all 10 songs from the 2020 standalone singles in a comprehensive repository, and adds stunning new artwork to the package. Following the release of this album, Night Demon toured extensively worldwide for the remainder of 2022.

=== Outsider (2023–present) ===
At the end of 2022, Night Demon unveiled their third studio album via a teaser video featuring the first track off their new album, "Prelude". The teaser video includes eerie footage from a rural location in Ireland showcasing an ancient church at the end of a path. Entitled Outsider, the album tells the story of a young gravedigger named Johnny who inadvertently stumbles into an alternate, shadow realm of his own hometown through a mysterious green mist that encircles the town. The first single and music video, "Outsider", was released on January 13, 2023, along with a full track listing and additional album details. A second single, "Escape from Beyond", followed on February 23, 2023, along with an accompanying music video. Outsider was released on March 17, 2023, to positive reviews. One reviewer wrote, "Given the passion on display for the glory days, however, methinks Night Demon are on course to creating the best version of it they possibly can; if you literally need heavy metal to live, then Outsider might be immortality on tap. It's a no-fuss, no-mess motorcycle ride along the highway of heavy metal history, blaring anthemic earworms and fist-pumping choruses all the way down. While that highway might be a straight and fairly unchallenging one, Night Demon have still captured and recreated that sensation of past metal glories as close to truly as possible while implementing their personal touches." According to another journalist, "Outsider is a beautifully paced record that deftly floats from slow and dark to hard and heavy with masterful confidence. Slowly building songs like 'Beyond the Grave' are balanced with burners like 'Escape from Beyond.' You get the sense that there's an overarching master plan behind every musical decision." A third single, "Beyond the Grave", was released on March 23, 2023, with yet another accompanying music video. A fourth video followed for standout album track "The Wrath" on August 24, 2023.

Following the release of Outsider, Night Demon have once again engaged in extensive worldwide touring activities. In spring 2023, Night Demon joined forces with Satan and Haunt for a 21-date North American tour dubbed the Hell's Decibels Tour. In addition to return engagements throughout Europe, the band's Outsider touring itinerary has brought them to previously-unseen territories such as Japan, Australia and even China, with many of those dates also featuring fellow Ventura metallurgists Cirith Ungol. In spring 2024, Night Demon embarked on a full-scale North American tour in direct support of German heavy metal legends Blind Guardian. They also played at the Hell's Heroes music festival held in Houston in March 2024. Along with Overkill, Night Demon will support King Diamond on their Saint Lucifer's Hospital 1920 tour in North America from October to December 2024. In early 2025, Night Demon will launch a four-week tour of mainland Europe and the United Kingdom in direct support of Queensrÿche.

== Band members ==
Current

- Jarvis Leatherby – lead vocals, bass (2011–present)
- Armand John Anthony – guitars, backing vocals (2016–present)
- Brian Wilson – drums (2023–present)

Former

- Brent Woodward – guitars (2011–2016)
- Patrick Bailey – drums (2011–2012)
- John Crerar – drums (2012–2013)
- Dusty Squires – drums, backing vocals (2013–2023)

== Discography ==
=== Studio albums ===
- Curse of the Damned (Century Media/US, Steamhammer/Europe) – January 2015
- Darkness Remains (Century Media/US, Steamhammer/Europe) – April 2017
- Outsider (Century Media) – March 2023

=== Other releases ===
- Night Demon (EP) (Shadow Kingdom Records) – 2013, re-released in various formats on a number of labels in 2014–2018
- Live Darkness (live album) (Century Media and Shadow Kingdom/US, Steamhammer/Europe) – August 2018
- Year of the Demon (compilation) (Century Media) – March 2022

=== Singles ===
- "Empires Fall" (Century Media) – 2020
- "Kill the Pain" (Century Media) – 2020
- "Are You Out There" (Century Media) – 2020
- "Vysteria" (Century Media) – 2020
- "In Trance" (Century Media) – 2020
- "The Last Day" (Decibel Flexi Series) – 2022
- "Outsider" (Century Media) – 2023
- "Escape from Beyond" (Century Media) – 2023
- "Beyond the Grave" (Century Media) – 2023
