= Diamonds (Enforcer album) =

Studio album by Enforcer
- Released: 24 May 2010
- Recorded: November 2009 – January 2010
- Studios: Leon Music, Karlstad, Sweden
- Genre: Heavy metal
- Length: 39:27
- Labels: Earache, Heavy Artillery
- Producer: Rikard Löfgren

Enforcer chronology
Into the Night (2008)	Diamonds (2010)	Death by Fire (2013)

Professional ratings
Review scores
Source	Rating
AllMusic	4/5 stars
Blabbermouth.net	8/10
Dead Rhetoric	9/10
Metal Express Radio	10/10
Rockfreaks.net	9/10
Rock Hard	8/10

Diamonds is the second album by Swedish heavy metal band Enforcer. It was released under Earache Records on 24 May 2010 in Europe, while Heavy Artillery Records released the album in North America on 25 May 2010.

== Track listing ==
No.	Title	Length
1.	"Midnight Vice"	3:15
2.	"Roll the Dice"	3:12
3.	"Katana"	6:00
4.	"Running in Menace"	3:46
5.	"High Roller"	3:21
6.	"Diamonds" (instrumental)	3:33
7.	"Live for the Night"	2:35
8.	"Nightmares"	4:30
9.	"Walk with Me"	6:00
10.	"Take Me to Hell"	3:15
Total length:		39:27

== Personnel ==
- Olof Wikstrand – vocals
- Adam Zaars – guitar
- Joseph Tholl – guitar
- Tobias Lindqvist – bass
- Jonas Wikstrand – drums
