= Zenith (Enforcer album) =

Studio album by Enforcer
- Released: April 26, 2019
- Recorded: March–November 2018
- Studio: Soundtrade Studios, Hvergelmer Studios, Leon Music
- Genre: Heavy metal
- Length: 46:30
- Label: Nuclear Blast
- Producer: Olof Wikstrand, Jonas Wikstrand

Enforcer chronology
From Beyond (2015)	Zenith (2019)	Nostalgia (2023)

Professional ratings
Review scores
Source	Rating
Distorted Sound	6/10
Ghost Cult Magazine	8/10
Metal Express Radio	9.2/10
New Noise Magazine	4/5

Zenith is the fifth album by Swedish heavy metal band Enforcer was released on 26 April 2019 through Nuclear Blast Records, four years after their previous album From Beyond. The band promoted the album by co-headling a North American tour with Red Death in January 2020.

== Track listing ==
No.	Title	Length
1.	"Die for the Devil"	3:12
2.	"Zenith of the Black Sun"	5:36
3.	"Searching for You"	2:53
4.	"Regrets"	6:00
5.	"The End of a Universe"	4:21
6.	"Sail On"	3:03
7.	"One Thousand Years of Darkness"	4:12
8.	"Thunder and Hell"	4:50
9.	"Forever We Worship the Dark"	5:27
10.	"Ode to Death"	6:56
Total length:		46:30

== Personnel ==
- Olof Wikstrand – vocals, guitar
- Jonathan Nordwall – guitar
- Tobias Lindqvist – bass
- Jonas Wikstrand – drums, keyboards, piano, additional vocals

== Charts ==
Chart (2019)	Peak position
German Albums (Offizielle Top 100)	65
