= Into the Night (Enforcer album) =

Studio album by Enforcer
- Released: 18 November 2008
- Recorded: 2007–2008
- Studio: Hvergelmer Studios, Arvika, Sweden
- Genre: Heavy metal, speed metal
- Length: 35:06
- Label: Heavy Artillery

Enforcer chronology
Into the Night (2008)	Diamonds (2010)

Professional ratings
Review scores
Source	Rating
AllMusic	4/5 stars
Blabbermouth.net	8/10
Metal Express Radio	9.5/10
Rockfreaks.net	6/10

Into the Night is the debut album from Swedish heavy metal band Enforcer, released on 18 November 2008 by Heavy Artillery Records.

== Track listing ==
1. "Black Angel" – 3:35
2. "Mistress from Hell" – 3:16
3. "Into the Night" – 3:15
4. "Speed Queen" – 3:23
5. "On the Loose" – 4:24
6. "City Lights" (instrumental) – 5:54
7. "Scream of the Savage" – 3:40
8. "Curse the Light" – 4:09
9. "Evil Attacker" – 3:37

== Personnel ==
- Olof Wikstrand - vocals
- Adam Zaars - guitars
- Joseph Tholl - bass
- Jonas Wikstrand - drums
