= Haunt (band) =

American heavy metal band

- Origin: Fresno, California
- Genres: Heavy metal; NWOTHM
- Years active: 2017–present
- Labels: Church Recordings; Shadow Kingdom Records; Decibel
- Members: Trevor William Church; Andy Saldate; Joel Dominguez; Sam Harman
- Past members: Matthew Wilhoit; John Tucker; Taylor Hollman; Daniel „Wolfie“ Wilson; Andy Lei

Haunt is an American heavy metal band from Fresno, California. The band was originally created as a solo project by Trevor William Church. As such, he is technically the only original member in the lineup. Church is also the sole songwriter and lyricist in the group.

== History ==
Haunt was originally formed by Trevor William Church as a musical project to be worked on alongside his existing band Beastmaker; the project was to take on a traditional metal sound as opposed to Beastmaker's doom metal style. In 2017 Church wrote and recorded Haunt's debut release, the extended play Luminous Eyes, with Daniel Wilson playing drums for the recording. It was first released digitally, as an independent release, but it later received physical releases from the Shadow Kingdom Records label.

In 2018, Church wrote and recorded one single for Haunt, Ghosts. Later that same year, Haunt released their first full-length studio album, Burst into Flame. Daniel Wilson returned to play drums for the album, this time as an official band member. Joining Church and Wilson for the album were Matthew Wilhoit on bass and John Tucker on guitar. Both Wilson and Tucker would stay as permanent members, but Wilhoit would be replaced by Taylor Hollman on following releases.

In 2019, Haunt released their second EP, (Mosaic Vision) their second studio album, (If Icarus Could Fly) and two split albums. (A Fool's Paradise / On the Streets Again and Sea of Dreams / The Crystal Temple). The following year they released their third and fourth studio albums, titled Mind Freeze and Flashback respectively, as well as the Burst into Demos compilation. In 2023 they released their fifth studio album (Chariot, Vol. 1). In 2024 they released new single (Steel Mountains)

== Members ==
=== Current members ===
- Trevor William Church – vocals, guitar, bass, drums (2017–present)
- Andy Lei - guitar (live) (2021–present)
- Andy Saldate - drums (live) (2021–present)

=== Past members ===
- Matthew Wilhoit – bass (2018)
- John Tucker - lead-guitar (2018-2021)
- Daniel "Wolfie" Wilson - drums (2017-2021)
- Taylor Hollman - bass (2018-2021)

== Discography ==
=== Studio albums ===
Title	Released	Record label
Burst into Flame	2018	Shadow Kingdom Records
If Icarus Could Fly	2019	Shadow Kingdom Records
Mind Freeze	2020	Shadow Kingdom Records
Flashback	2020	Church Recordings
Beautiful Distraction	2021	Church Recordings
Windows of Your Heart	2022	Church Recordings
Golden Arm	2023	Church Recordings
Dreamers	2024	Church Recordings
Ignite	2025	Church Recordings
Setting Course	2026	Church Recordings

=== Extended plays ===
Title	Released	Record label
Luminous Eyes	2017	Independent / Shadow Kingdom Records
Mosaic Vision	2019	Shadow Kingdom Records
Hell Tracks	2023	Independent

=== Singles ===
Title	Released	Record label
Ghosts	2018	Decibel
In Our Dreams	2021	Church Recordings
Beautiful Distraction	2021	Church Recordings
Serenade	2024	Church Recordings
Steel Mountains	2024	Church Recordings
Locked Out	2024	Church Recordings
Soaring Through The Ages	2025	Church Recordings
The Day The Earth Went Dark	2026	Doomentia

=== Split albums ===
Title	Released	Split With	Record label
A Fool's Paradise / On the Streets Again	2019	Seven Sisters	Church Recordings
Sea of Dreams / The Crystal Temple	2019	Fortress	Independent

=== Compilations ===
Title	Released	Record label
Burst into Demos	2020	Church Recordings
Triumph	2020	Church Recordings
