= Enforcer (band) =

Swedish heavy metal band

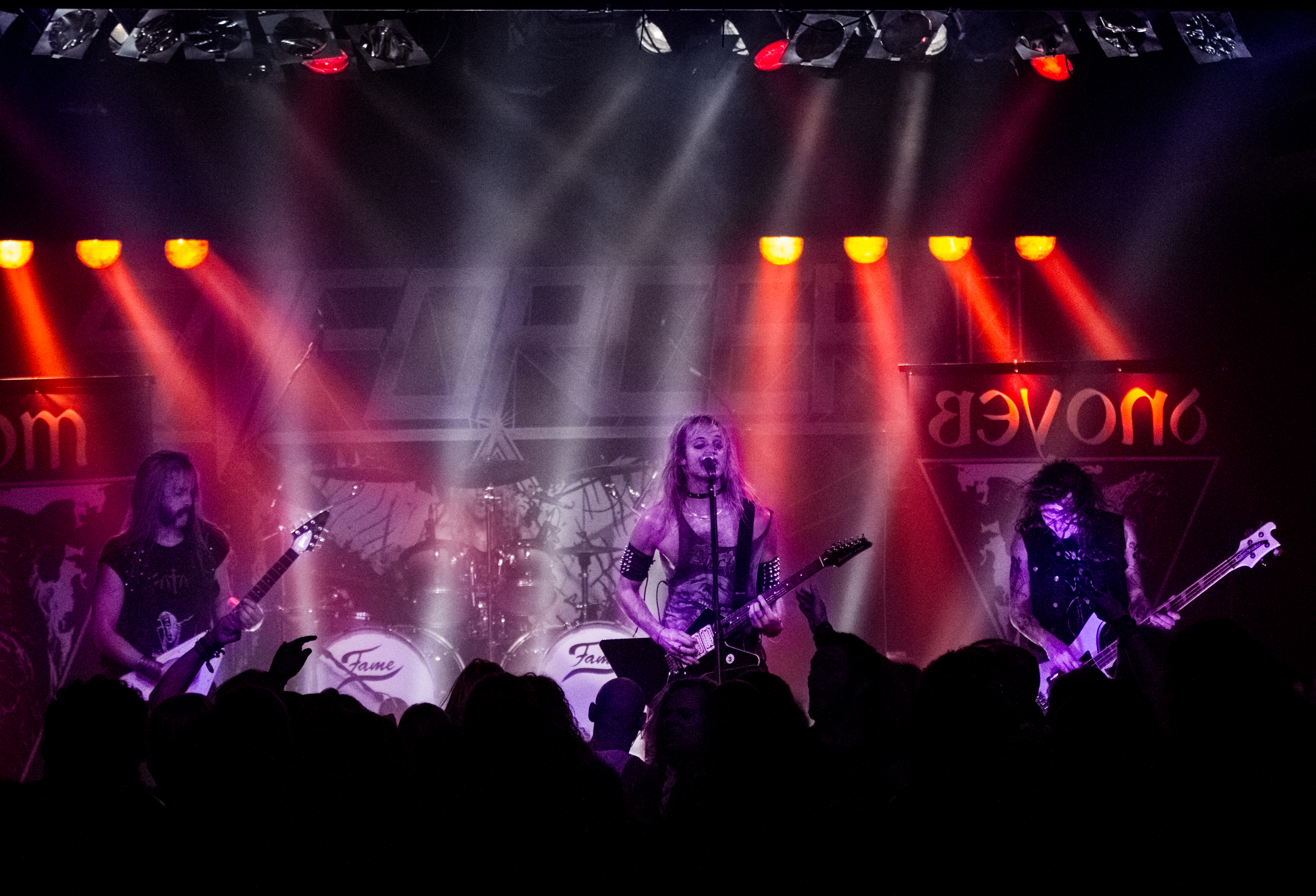
- Enforcer performing in 2015

Background information
- Origin: Arvika, Sweden
- Genres: Heavy metal; speed metal
- Years active: 2004–present
- Labels: Heavy Artillery, Earache, Nuclear Blast
- Members: Olof Wikstrand; Jonas Wikstrand; Jonathan Nordwall; Garth Condit
- Past members: Jakob Ljungberg; Adams Zaars; Joseph Tholl; Tobias Lindqvist
- Website: enforcer.bandcamp.com

Enforcer is a Swedish heavy metal band formed in 2004 in Arvika. They are considered part of the new wave of traditional heavy metal.

== History ==
Enforcer released their first album, Into the Night, through the Heavy Artillery label in November 2008.

Their second full-length album, Diamonds, was released under Earache Records on 24 May 2010 in Europe, while Heavy Artillery Records released the album in North America on 25 May 2010.

On 1 February 2013, Enforcer released Death by Fire, their third full-length album, in Stockholm. They headlined a Belgian release show along with Evil Invaders on 2 February.

Their third album was released on 27th of February 2015. The album was called From Beyond. This album would be the last one to feature Josepth Tholl on guitar.

In May 2022, Enforcer announced on Facebook that American Garth Condit will be their new bassist, following the departure of Tobias Lindqvist.

In 2025, the band participated in the Hell's Heroes music festival held at the White Oak Music Hall in Houston.

== Musical style ==
Enforcer is considered part of the new wave of traditional heavy metal (NWOTHM), an ongoing movement that in recent years has seen the return of traditional-sounding metal bands (similar to the Swedish glam metal revival). When Sweden Rock Magazine asked them about playing "old school", they answered that heavy metal is not old school, it is timeless. The name of the NWOTHM was inspired by the new wave of British heavy metal, which the movement strongly identifies with. Other bands considered part of the movement include Steelwing, White Wizzard, Cauldron, Holy Grail, Skull Fist and, more recently, Sons of Lioth.

== Band members ==
Current

- Olof Wikstrand – lead vocals (2004–present), guitars (2004–2008, 2011–present), bass, drums, (2004–2007, 2007–2008, 2021–2022)
- Jonas Wikstrand – drums (2006–2007, 2007-present), keyboards, piano, backing vocals (2006–present), bass (2006–2008, 2021–2022)
- Jonathan Nordwall – guitars, backing vocals (2019–present)
- Garth Condit – bass (2022–present)

Former

- Adam Zaars – guitars (2006–2011)
- Jakob Ljungberg – drums (2007)
- Joseph Tholl – guitars (2007–2019), bass (2007–2008)
- Tobias Lindqvist – bass (2008–2021)

Live

- Chase Becker – bass (2019)
- Jonny Nesta – guitars, backing vocals (2019)
- Brian Wilson – drums, backing vocals (2019)
- Fabio Alessandrini – drums (2023–present)

Timeline

== Discography ==
Studio albums

- Into the Night (2008)
- Diamonds (2010)
- Death by Fire (2013)
- From Beyond (2015)
- Zenith (2019)
- Nostalgia (2023)

Live albums

- Live by Fire (2015)
- Live by Fire II (2021)

Singles and demos

- "Evil Attacker" (2005) (demo)
- "Evil Attacker c/w Mistress from Hell" (2007)
- "Night Walker/Take Me to Hell" (2011)
- "High Roller/Back on the Road" (2011)
- "Mesmerized by Fire" (2013)
- "At the End of the Rainbow" (2021)

Others

- "Nightmare Over the UK" (2010) (split album with Cauldron)

Music videos

- "Black Angel" on YouTube
- "Midnight Vice" on YouTube
- "Mesmerized By Fire" on YouTube
- "Destroyer" on YouTube
