= Skull Fist =

Canadian heavy metal band

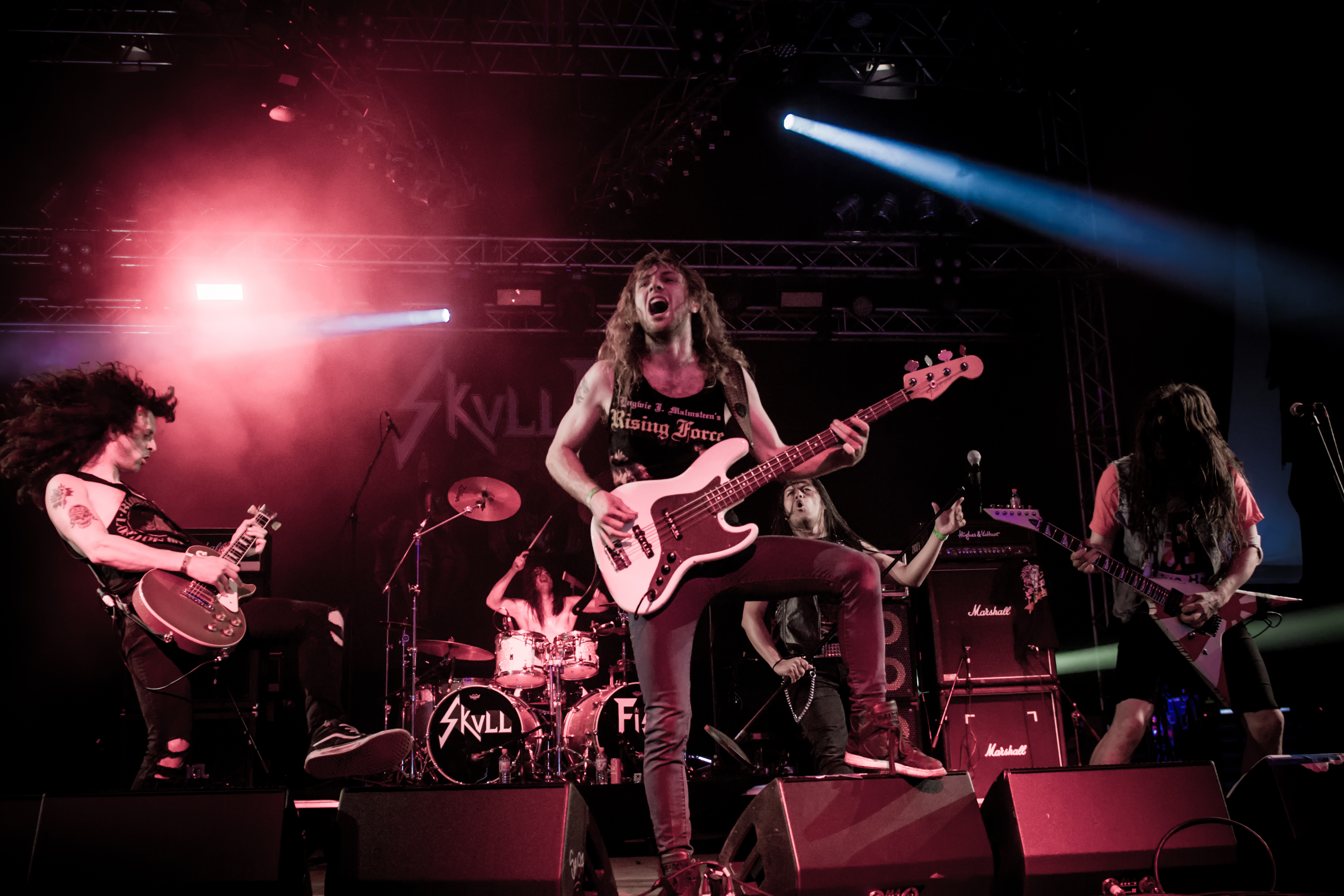
- Skull Fist at Wacken Open Air 2017

Background information
- Origin: Toronto, Ontario, Canada
- Genres: Heavy metal; speed metal
- Years active: 2006–present
- Labels: Noise Art; Atomic Fire
- Members: Casey Guest; JJ Tartaglia; Zach Slaughter

Skull Fist is a Canadian heavy metal band formed in Toronto.

== History ==
=== Formation, Heavier Than Metal and Head of the Pack (2006–2010) ===
Skull Fist was founded in 2006 by guitarist/singer Zach Slaughter in Toronto. The band released a two-song demo in 2006 titled No False Metal which included the tracks "Ride The Beast" and "No False Metal". The band has seen many lineup changes with many different musicians stepping in for a few weeks at a time from 2006 to 2010 leaving Slaughter the sole consistent member and many musicians coming and going on a regular basis. Slaughter released the Heavier than Metal EP with "Alison Thunderland" on drums and "Sir Shred" on second guitar in 2010 to a very positive response in the metal community and later signed to Noise Art Records shortly after.

For the EP release, the band completed two tours across Canada, the Metal Assault festival in Europe along with a tour in January 2011 through Europe. Afterwards they played Up the Hammers Festival in Greece and toured with Bullet and Enforcer in April 2011. Alison and Shred left the band due to personal conflicts. Casey Slade joined the band shortly after the EP was recorded, who had actually replaced Jonny Nesta who was filling in on bass until Slaughter settled on a permanent member. Nesta then joined Skull Fist on guitar which saw the release of the first Skull Fist album Head of the Pack. It was released 26 August 2011. After the release of the album Jake Purchase was added to the band and another Canada tour was done along with the power of metal tour with Sabaton and Grave Digger. The album has received great reviews across the globe which led them to another European tour with Grand Magus, Bullet, Steel Wing, and Vanderbuyst.

The summer of 2012 saw the band sharing the stage with Megadeth, W.A.S.P., and Uriah Heep for The Rock the Nation touring festival event "Metal Fest 2012". Jake Purchase left and was replaced with Chris Steve. This was followed by a tour in Japan with Solitude and featured a gig with Japanese black/thrash act Sabbat, another Canadian tour and a tour through Brazil. The release of the second album for 2013 was postponed by a lack of funding and then postponed yet again after Slaughter broke his neck and other bones in a skateboarding accident.

=== Chasing the Dream (2014–2015) ===
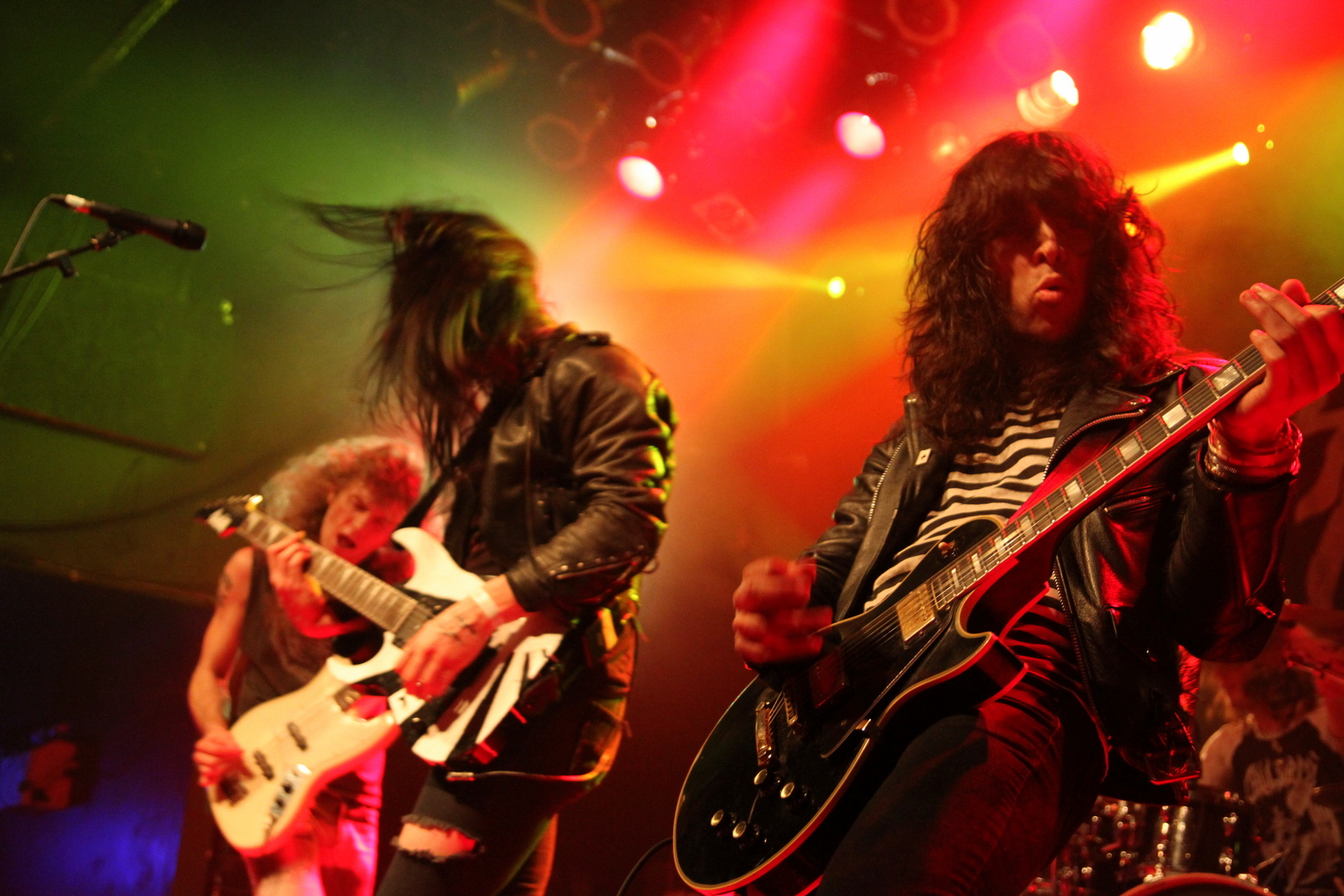
Skull Fist in 2014

The band's second LP titled Chasing the Dream was released in January 2014. In a 2013 interview, front man Jackie Slaughter explained the three-year gap between the debut and its follow up:

"Money doesn't grow on trees apparently. We didn't have enough moula when we originally planned to record, so we pushed it back 2 months and then one month later I selfishly decided to break my neck skateboarding which put us out for another 2 months."

At the beginning of the 2014 the band stated their European Tour with 30 dates over 14 countries. After the European gigs, the band gave nine concerts in Mexico. Between these dates they appeared at some festivals as well and completed a South American, US, and Canadian tour along with the other dates. The album was nominated for a Juno award in Canada and had seen the band's popularity increase.

The band's lineup was initially unstable but since 2011 has featured founder Jackie Slaughter, guitarist Jonny Nesta and bassist Casey Slade. This lineup has featured on both of the band's studio albums (albeit with different drummers).

=== Way of the Road and next album (2015–present) ===
On 30 June 2015, Zach Slaughter left the band for approximately four months until returning. The band's third studio album was released on 26 October 2018, and was titled Way of the Road. Skull Fist is also featured in the soundtrack of horror/comedy New Zealand film, Deathgasm.

In July 2021, the band's official Facebook page announced that Jonny Nesta has amicably parted ways.

Skull Fist has released their fourth album, Paid In Full, in 2022.

On 23rd February, 2026, the band released a single, "City Gonna Burn".

== Members ==
- Zach Slaughter – lead vocals, rhythm guitar (2006–2015, 2015–present), lead guitar (2021–present)
- Casey Slade – bass, backing vocals (2011–present)
- JJ Tartaglia – drums (2014–present)

=== Former notable members ===
- Sir Shred – lead guitar (2006, 2010–2011)
- Alison Thunderland – drums (2009–2011)
- Chris Steve – drums (2013–2014)
- Jonny Nesta – lead guitar, backing vocals (2011–2021), lead vocals, rhythm guitar (2015)

== Discography ==
=== Studio albums ===
- Head of the Pack (2011)
- Chasing The Dream (2014)
- Way of the Road (2018)
- Paid in Full (2022)

=== EPs ===
- No False Metal (2006)
- Heavier Than Metal (2010)

== See also ==
- Traditional metal
