= Facedown Records discography =

This is a comprehensive discography of the record label Facedown Records and its imprints Strike First Records and Dreamt Music.

== 1990s ==
Artist	Album	Release date	Imprint
No Innocent Victim / Phanatik	No Innocent Victim / Phanatik	February 1, 1998	Facedown
Positive Youth / Persevere	Positive Youth/Persevere (Split)	April 1, 1998	Facedown
Overcome	Life Of Death	May 1, 1998	Facedown
Overcome	Overcome	November 3, 1998	Facedown
Born Blind	Pressing On	November 28, 1998	Facedown
Dodgin' Bullets	Soundtrack To the End of the World	September 24, 1999	Facedown
Overcome	Immortal Until Their Work is Done	December 14, 1999	Facedown

== 2000s ==
Artist	Album	Release date	Imprint
Figure Four	No Weapon Formed Against Us	January 4, 2000	Facedown
Dodgin' Bullets	World Wide War	August 8, 2000	Facedown
Ceasefire	The Cycle of Unbelief	October 24, 2000	Facedown
The Deal	Yesterday, Today & Forever	October 24, 2000	Facedown
Point of Recognition	Refresh, Renew	January 9, 2001	Facedown
xDISCIPLEx A.D.	Heaven & Hell	January 9, 2001	Facedown
Anchor	Ship Wrecked Life	February 13, 2001	Facedown
Figure Four	When It's All Said and Done	May 29, 2001	Facedown
Torn in Two	Soli Deo Gloria	July 10, 2001	Facedown
Dogwood	This is Not a New Album	July 17, 2001	Facedown
One 21	One 21	September 4, 2001	Facedown
Overcome	More Than Death	October 2, 2001	Facedown
xDISCIPLEx A.D.	Doxology	November 13, 2001	Facedown
Point of Recognition / Cast in Stone / Torn in Two	Now the Tables Have Turned	November 24, 2001	Facedown
Sinai Beach	Wolves in Sheeps Clothing	November 30, 2001	Strike First
The Deal	Who's Pulling Your Strings	January 8, 2002	Facedown
Dodgin' Bullets	Earn Your Respect	April 2, 2002	Facedown
Point of Recognition	Day Of Defeat	June 4, 2002	Facedown
Hanover Saints	Truth Rings Out	July 16, 2002	Facedown
Nodes of Ranvier	Lost Senses, More Innocence	July 16, 2002	Facedown
Various Artists	22 Ton Sampler	July 16, 2002	Facedown
Falling Cycle	The Conflict	August 6, 2002	Facedown
Alove for Enemies	Broken Pledge	2003	Strike First
Sinai Beach	When Breath Escapes	March 4, 2003	Facedown
Comeback Kid	Turn It Around	March 4, 2003	Facedown
Various Artists	Facedown Family Sampler	April 29, 2003	Facedown
Seventh Star	Dead End	June 3, 2003	Facedown
xDISCIPLEx A.D.	Blood Feud	June 3, 2003	Facedown
Nodes of Ranvier	Nodes of Ranvier	June 1, 2003	Facedown
Indwelling	And My Eye Shall Weep	July 1, 2003	Facedown
Various Artists	DVD Vol. 1	August 12, 2003	Facedown
One-21	Grenade	October 14, 2003	Facedown
Symphony in Peril	Lost Memoirs and Faded Pictures	November 4, 2003	Facedown
Inked in Blood	Awakening Vesuvis	2004	Strike First
Clear Convictions	Warning	2004	Strike First
The Deal	Cut Throat	February 17, 2004	Facedown
Bloody Sunday	They Attack at Dawn	March 2004	Strike First
In Due Time	Back to Basics	March 2004	Strike First
Immortal Souls	Ice Upon the Night	March 9, 2004	Facedown
Bloodlined Calligraphy	The Beginning of the End	July 24, 2004	Strike First
Opposition of One	In the Line of Change	September 15, 2004	Strike First
Hanover Saints	Blood, Guts, & Glory	2005	Strike First
Brutal Fight	Our Merciful Father	2005	Strike First
In Due Time	The Final Showdown	2005	Strike First
Various Artists	Facedown Fest 2004 DVD	January 4, 2005	Facedown
Symphony in Peril	The Whore's Trophy	February 15, 2005	Facedown
Alove for Enemies	The Harvest	March 8, 2005	Facedown
Bloodlined Calligraphy	They Want You Silent	April 26, 2005	Facedown
Seventh Star	Brood Of Vipers	May 10, 2005	Facedown
Bloody Sunday	To Sentence the Dead	May 10, 2005	Facedown
Nodes of Ranvier	The Years to Come	September 13, 2005	Facedown
Anam Cara	Anam Cara	October 2005	Strike First
No Innocent Victim	To Burn Again	November 8, 2005	Facedown
xLooking Forwardx	The Path We Tread	November 8, 2005	Facedown
Inked in Blood	Lay Waste the Poets	November 8, 2005	Facedown
Jesus Wept	Sick City	2006	Strike First
Counting the Days	Finding a Balance	2006	Strike First
Flee the Seen	Doubt Becomes the New Addiction	March 14, 2006	Facedown
Seventh Star	100% DVD	March 14, 2006	Facedown
The Redemption Song	Confession	March 14, 2006	Strike First
Hit the Deck	Look Alive	April 11, 2006	Strike First
Anam Cara	Ready to Live	April 11, 2006	Strike First
Kingston Falls	The Crescendo of Sirens	April 11, 2006	Strike First
Jesus Wept	Show's Over	April 11, 2006	Strike First
Alove for Enemies	Resistance	July 11, 2006	Facedown
Within	The End is Near	July 11, 2006	Strike First
Call to Preserve	Unsinkable	August 8, 2006	Strike First
Today Forever	The New Pathetic	August 22, 2006	Strike First
Demise of Eros	Neither Storm nor Quake nor Fire	August 22, 2006	Strike First
War of Ages	Pride of the Wicked	September 5, 2006	Facedown
Bloodlined Calligraphy	Ypsilanti	September 19, 2006	Facedown
xDEATHSTARx	We Are The Threat	February 20, 2007	Facedown
Means	Sending You Strength	March 6, 2007	Facedown
Sleeping Giant	Dread Champions of the Last Days	May 1, 2007	Facedown
Seventh Star	The Undisputed Truth	June 12, 2007	Facedown
Various Artists	Something Worth Fighting For	June 26, 2007	Facedown
War of Ages	Fire From the Tomb	July 24, 2007	Facedown
Immortal Souls	Wintereich	August 21, 2007	Facedown
Impending Doom	Nailed. Dead. Risen.	September 4, 2007	Facedown
Inked in Blood	Sometimes We Are Beautiful	September 18, 2007	Facedown
A Plea for Purging	A Critique of Mind and Thought	October 2, 2007	Facedown
Remove the Veil	Another Way Home	October 16, 2007	Facedown
Thieves & Liars	When Dream Become Reality	January 22, 2008	Dreamt Music
Kingston Falls	Armada on Mercury	March 18, 2008	Facedown
For Today	Ekklesia	April 1, 2008	Facedown
Means	To Keep Me From Sinking	May 27, 2008	Facedown
Take It Back!	Can't Fight Back	June 24, 2008	Facedown
War of Ages	Arise & Conquer	July 22, 2008	Facedown
My Epic	I Am Undone	August 5, 2008	Dreamt Music
Wrench in the Works	Lost Art of Heaping Coal	August 19, 2007	Facedown
Call to Preserve	From Isolation	September 30, 2008	Facedown
Hope for the Dying	Hope for the Dying	November 25, 2008	Strike First
xDEATHSTARx	The Triumph	November 25, 2008	Facedown
A Hope for Home	The Everlasting Man	January 20, 2009	Strike First
The Great Commission	And Every Knee Shall Bow	February 17, 2009	Strike First
A Plea for Purging	Depravity	March 3, 2009	Facedown
Impending Doom	The Serpent Servant	March 31, 2009	Facedown
Earth From Above	Numbered With The Transgressors	April 14, 2009	Strike First
Through Solace	The World on Standby	April 28, 2009	Strike First
Sleep for Sleepers	The Clearing	May 12, 2009	Dreamt
In the Midst of Lions	Out of Darkness	May 26, 2009	Strike First
The Reckoning	The Road Less Traveled	June 1, 2009	Strike First
For Today	Ekklesia	June 9, 2009	Facedown
Sleeping Giant	Sons of Thunder	June 23, 2009	Facedown
Hands	Creator	July 21, 2009	Facedown
Take It Back!	Rumors of Revolt	August 18, 2009	Facedown
Thieves & Liars	American Rock 'n' Roll	September 1, 2009	Facedown
Abel	The Honest Love	September 1, 2009	Dreamt
Take It Back!	Atrocities	November 10, 2009	Facedown

== 2010s ==
Artist	Album	Release date	Imprint
Saving Grace	Unbreakable	January 5, 2010	Strike First
Shapes Stars Make	These Mountains Are Safe	January 19, 2010	Dreamt
Onward to Olympas	This World Is Not My Home	January 19, 2010	Facedown
Wrench in the Works	Decrease/Increase	March 16, 2010	Facedown
A Hope for Home	Realis	March 30, 2010	Facedown
Letter to the Exiles	The Shadow Line	April 13, 2010	Strike First
War of Ages	Eternal	April 13, 2010	Facedown
As Hell Retreats	Revival	May 25, 2010	Strike First
Call to Preserve	Life of Defiance	June 8, 2010	Facedown
My Epic	Yet	July 6, 2010	Facedown
A Plea for Purging	The Marriage of Heaven and Hell	July 6, 2010	Facedown
Impending Doom	There Will Be Violence	July 20, 2010	Facedown
In the Midst of Lions	The Heart of Man	August 3, 2010	Facedown
The Burial	The Winepress	August 17, 2010	Strike First
For Today	Breaker	August 31, 2010	Facedown
Messengers	Anthems	November 9, 2010	Strike First
Your Memorial	Atonement	November 23, 2010	Facedown
Ark of the Covenant	Separation EP	December 7, 2010	Strike First
Ace Augustine	The Absolute	January 18, 2011	Strike First
Overcome	The Great Campaign of Sabotage	February 1, 2011	Facedown
Gideon	Costs	March 1, 2011	Facedown
Onward to Olympas	The War Within Us	March 15, 2011	Facedown
Hope for the Dying	Dissimulation	April 26, 2011	Facedown
Dynasty	Truer Living with a Youthful Vengeance	May 24, 2011	Strike First
Call to Preserve	Validation	July 5, 2011	Facedown
My Epic	Broken Voice	July 5, 2011	Facedown
Hands	Give Me Rest	July 5, 2011	Facedown
Saving Grace	Behind Enemy Lines (Re-release)	July 12, 2011	Strike First
Altars	Opposition	July 19, 2011	Strike First
Nothing Til Blood	When Lambs Become Lions	September 27, 2011	Strike First
Immortal Souls	IV: The Requiem for the Art of Death	October 11, 2011	Facedown
We the Gathered	Believer	October 25, 2011	Strike First
A Plea for Purging	Fat Pride 7"	November 8, 2011	Facedown
A Plea for Purging	The Life & Death of A Plea for Purging	November 8, 2011	Facedown
Saving Grace	The King Is Coming	November 22, 2011	Facedown
In the Midst of Lions	Shadows	November 22, 2011	Facedown
A Hope for Home	In Abstraction	December 6, 2011	Facedown
Leaders	Now We Are Free	March 27, 2012	Facedown
The Burial	Lights and Perfections	March 27, 2012	Facedown
War of Ages	Return to Life	April 24, 2012	Facedown
Altars	Conclusions	June 5, 2012	Facedown
Altars	Revelation	June 19, 2012	Facedown
xLooking Forwardx	Down with the Ship	June 19, 2012	Facedown
Gideon	Milestone	July 3, 2012	Facedown
Your Memorial	Redirect	July 17, 2012	Facedown
Letter to the Exiles	Make Amends	August 14, 2012	Facedown
Everything in Slow Motion	Red	October 2, 2012	Facedown
Onward to Olympas	Indicator	October 9, 2012	Facedown
Overcome	No Reserves. No Retreats. No Regrets.	January 8, 2013	Facedown
Dynasty	Beyond Measure	January 22, 2013	Facedown
Those Who Fear	Unholy Anger	February 5, 2013	Facedown
Hope for the Dying	Aletheia	March 19, 2013	Facedown
Comeback Kid	Turn It Around (10 Year Anniversary)	April 11, 2013	Facedown
Fallstar	Backdraft	April 16, 2013	Facedown
Ark of the Covenant	Self Harvest	April 30, 2013	Facedown
Altars	Something More	May 14, 2013	Facedown
Colossus	Time & Eternal	June 11, 2013	Facedown
Extol	Extol	June 25, 2013	Facedown
The Burial	In the Taking of Flesh	July 9, 2013	Facedown
Leaders	Indomitable	September 3, 2013	Facedown
Everything in Slow Motion	Phoenix	December 10, 2013	Facedown
My Epic	Behold	December 10, 2013	Facedown
Saving Grace	The Urgency	January 21, 2014	Facedown
My Epic	Behold (Instrumental)	May 27, 2014	Facedown
Those Who Fear	Death Sentence	June 24, 2014	Facedown
War of Ages	Supreme Chaos	July 22, 2014	Facedown
Mouth of the South	Struggle Well	August 5, 2014	Facedown
Colossus	Badlands	September 16, 2014	Facedown
Gideon	Calloused	October 14, 2014	Facedown
xDeathstarx	Generation (Single)	April 28, 2015	Facedown
Attalus	Into the Sea	June 2, 2015	Facedown
For All Eternity	Metanoia	July 10, 2015	Facedown
Rival Choir	I Believe, Help My Unbelief	February 5, 2016	Facedown
Your Memorial	Forever United (Single)	February 19, 2016	Facedown
Hope for the Dying	Legacy	March 4, 2016	Facedown
Poured Out	Blind Heart	April 8, 2016	Facedown
Everything in Slow Motion	Laid Low	April 22, 2016	Facedown
My Epic	Viscera	May 6, 2016	Facedown
Saving Grace	Recidivist (Single)	August 19, 2016	Facedown
Comrades	Lone/Grey	October 7, 2016	Facedown
Poured Out	To the Point of Death	October 21, 2016	Facedown
Those Who Fear	State of Mind	December 9, 2016	Facedown
Hands	New Heaven/New Earth	February 3, 2017	Facedown
xDisciplex A.D.	Imitation of Love	February 10, 2017	Facedown
Nothing Left	Destroy and Rebuild	April 21, 2017	Facedown
Deathbreaker	Disconnect	May 12, 2017	Facedown
Fleshkiller	Awaken	September 15, 2017	Facedown
Your Memorial	Your Memorial	November 10, 2017	Facedown
War of Ages	Alpha	December 8, 2017	Facedown
For All Eternity	The Will to Rebuild	December 15, 2017	Facedown
Sleeping Giant	I Am	January 26, 2018	Facedown
My Epic	Ultraviolet	March 30, 2018	Facedown
DENS	No Small Tempest	June 29, 2018	Facedown
Weathered	Stranger Here	August 17, 2018	Facedown
My Epic	Violence	May 10, 2019	Facedown
Comrades	For We Are Not Yet, We Are Only Becoming	June 7, 2019	Facedown
War Of Ages	Void	September 13, 2019	Facedown
What We Do in Secret	Repose	November 22, 2019	Facedown
Northlander	Forces of Light	December 6, 2019	Facedown
Nothing Left	Disconnected	December 13, 2019	Facedown

== 2020s ==
Artist	Album	Release date	Imprint
DENS	Taming Tongue	March 6, 2020	Facedown
Deathbreaker	Isolate	May 29, 2020	Facedown
American Arson	A Line in the Sand	July 3, 2020	Facedown
Everything in Slow Motion	Influence	October 16, 2020	Facedown
Weathered	Everything All At Once	November 20, 2020	Facedown
Fallstar	Sunbreather	February 12, 2021	Facedown
DENS	Tamed Tongues	March 4, 2021	Facedown
Meadows	In Those Days & Also After	September 3, 2021	Facedown
War of Ages	Rhema	October 29, 2021	Facedown
Bloodlines	Revel	November 12, 2021	Facedown
Weathered	Blind EP	May 6, 2022	Facedown
Confessions of a Traitor	Punishing Myself Before God Does	September 16, 2022	Facedown
Bloodlines	Psalm of the Depths	October 21, 2022	Facedown
HolyName	HolyName	January 13, 2023	Facedown
Fallstar	Sacred Mirrors	July 14, 2023	Facedown
Cultist	Slow Suicide	January 3, 2023	Facedown
HolyName	Initiation: Live in Chicago	July 27, 2023	Facedown
War of Ages	Dominion	September 15, 2023	Facedown
American Arson	Sand & Cinder, Tide & Timber	November 3, 2023	Facedown
Meadows	Familiar with Pain	March 29, 2024	Facedown
Bloodlines	Holiness Cries	July 26, 2024	Facedown
