= Dave Quiggle =

American guitarist (born 1974)

- Birth name: David Quiggle
- Also known as: Davey
- Born: May 28, 1974 (age 51)
- Origin: Erie, Pennsylvania, U.S.
- Genres: Hardcore punk, thrash metal, crossover thrash
- Occupation: Guitarist
- Years active: 1995–present
- Labels: Facedown
- Formerly of: xDISCIPLEx A.D., No Innocent Victim, Jesus Wept, Shockwave
- Website: Dave Quiggle on Facebook

Dave Quiggle is an American musician, best known as a guitarist in the hardcore punk genre. He has played in various bands including xDISCIPLEx A.D., No Innocent Victim, Shockwave, and Jesus Wept. He currently works for Facedown Records as a graphic designer.

== Personal life ==
Quiggle is married to Shannon Quiggle, (since 1999) a fellow employee of Facedown Records. Dan Quiggle, xDISCIPLEx A.D.'s vocalist, is Dave's brother. Quiggle is an outspoken Christian.

== Bands ==
Disbanded

- Jesus Wept – guitar (2004–?)
- xDISCIPLEx A.D. – guitar (1995–2004)
- Shockwave – guitar (1996–2004)
- Prayer for a Fallen Angel – guitar (1997)
- Mother Ship – guitar
- No Innocent Victim – guitar (2005, 2017)

== Discography ==
xDISCIPLEx A.D.

- Lantern (1996, EP)
- Scarab (1997, EP)
- Imitation of Love (1998, Album; Goodfellow Records)
- No Blood, No Alter Now (1999, Album; Goodlife Recordings)
- Heaven and Hell (2000, Album; Triple Crown Records)
- I Stand Alone (2000, Split EP w/ Stretch Arm Strong; I Stand Alone Records)
- Doxology (2001, Album; Facedown Records)
- The Revelation (2003, Album; Triple Crown Records)
- Blood Feud (2003, EP; Facedown Records)
- Benediction (2003 Album; Angelskin Media)

Jesus Wept

- Sick City (2004, EP; Independent)
- Show's Over (2006, Album; Strike First Records)

Shockwave

- Demo (1997, Demo; Unsigned)
- Warpath (1997, EP; Surprise Attack Records)
- Dominicon (1999, Album; Good Life Recordings)
- Autohate (2000, Album; Good Life Recordings)
- Omega Supreme (The Complete Collection: 1996–2001) (2001, Compilation; Triple Crown Recordings)
- Live in Poland (2001, Live album; Alone Records)
- The Ultimate Doom (2004, Album; Triple Crown Recordings)
- This World is Ours: The Complete Recordings (2015, Compilation; Organized Crime Records)

No Innocent Victim

- To Burn Again (2005, Album; Facedown Records)

Mother Ship

- Obedience (1994, Demo; Unsigned)
- Vital Indecision (1995, EP; Unsigned)

Production

- Dread Champions of the Last Days by Sleeping Giant
- Sons of Thunder by Sleeping Giant
- Kingdom Days in an Evil Age by Sleeping Giant
- The Infinite Order by Living Sacrifice
- The King Is Coming by Saving Grace
- Misanthropy Pure by Shai Hulud
- Eternal by War of Ages
- Resistance by Alove for Enemies
- Depravity by A Plea for Purging
- Not Without a Heart Once Nourished by Sticks and Stones Within Blood Ill-Tempered Misanthropy Pure Gold Can Stay by Shai Hulud
- Nailed. Dead. Risen. by Impending Doom
- The Life & Death of A Plea for Purging by A Plea For Purging
- A Critique of Mind and Thought by A Plea For Purging
- Neither Storm nor Quake nor Fire by Demise of Eros
- Supreme Chaos by War of Ages
- When Lambs Become Lions by Nothing Til Blood
- Unholy Anger by Those Who Fear
- When Given Time to Grow by Conveyer
- Truer Living with a Youthful Vengeance by Dynasty
- Time & Eternal by Colossus
- The Shadow Line by Letter to the Exiles
- The Absolute by Ace Augustine
- Struggle Well by Mouth of the South
- Something More by Altars
- Separation by Ark of the Covenant
- Self Harvest by Ark of the Covenant
- Phoenix by Everything in Slow Motion
- No Reserves. No Retreats. No Regrets. by Overcome
- Make Amends by Letter to the Exiles
- Into the Sea by Attalus
- Into the Killing Fields by All Out War
- Indomitable by Leaders
- Indicator by Onward to Olympas
- In the Taking of Flesh by The Burial
- Down with the Ship by xLooking Forwardx
- Death Sentence by Those Who Fear
- Beyond Measure by Dynasty
- Between Two Cities by Count To Four
- Behold by My Epic
- Badlands by Colossus
- Anthems by Messengers
- Aletheia by Hope for the Dying
- Sinking Deeper by Run Devil Run
- Shipwrecked Life by Anchor
- Omega Supreme: The Complete Collection 1996–2001 by Shockwave
- Losing All Hope Is Freedom by Evergreen Terrace
- Doxology by xDISCIPLEx A.D.
- Who's Pulling Your Strings by The Deal
- Twenty Two Ton Sampler by Various Artists
- Truth Rings Out by Hanover Saints
- Earn Your Respect by Dodgin' Bullets
- Day of Defeat by Point of Recognition
- Suffering the Loss by Figure Four
- XOne FifthX vs. Evergreen Terrace by Evergreen Terrace/XOne FifthX
- Condemned to Suffer by All Out War
- Breath Between Battles by Sleeping By The Riverside
- Necropolis: City of the Damned by Subzero
- CutThroat by The Deal
- To Burn Again by No Innocent Victim
- The Path We Tread by xLooking Forwardx
- The Harvest by Alove for Enemies
- Road That Leads to Home by Regal Line
- Cause Above the Conquest by Nor Am I
- Ypsilanti by Bloodlined Calligraphy
- War of Ages by War of Ages
- Unsinkable by Call to Preserve
- They Attack at Dawn by Bloody Sunday
- The Crescendo of Sirens by Kingston Falls
- Sick EP by Jesus Wept
- Show's Over by Jesus Wept
- Ready to Live by Anam Cara
- Pride of the Wicked by War of Ages
- Finding a Balance by Counting the Days
- Doubt Becomes the New Addiction by Flee the Seen
- Death to Tyrants by Sick of It All
- Confession by The Redemption Song
- Beauty and the Breakdown by Bury Your Dead
- A Call for Blood: A Tribute to Hatebreed by Various Artists
- What We See When We Shut Our Eyes by With Passion
- What This Means to Me by xLooking Forwardx
- The Undisputed Truth by Seventh Star
- The Best of Atreyu by Atreyu
- Something Worth Fighting For by Various Artists
- Sending You Strength by Means
- Fire from the Tomb by War of Ages
- Assassins in the House of God by All Out War
- Another Way Home by Remove the Veil
- When Dreams Become Reality by Thieves & Liars
- To Keep Me from Seeking by Means
- The Triumph by xDEATHSTARx
- Lost Art of Heaping Coal by Wrench in the Works
- I Am Undone by My Epic
- Hope for the Dying by Hope for the Dying
- From Isolation by Call to Preserve
- Ekklesia by For Today
- Can't Fight Robots by Take It Back!
- Behind Enemy Lines by Saving Grace
- Arise and Conquer by War of Ages
- Total World Domination by Sworn Enemy
- The Clearing by Sleep for Sleepers
- Prepare for Devastation by Tyrant
- Portraits by For Today
- Ensayo y Error by Georgina
- Embrace by Thick As Blood
- American Rock 'N' Roll by Thieves & Liars
- Yet by My Epic
- Unbreakable by Saving Grace
- This World Is Not My Home by Onward to Olympas
- The Marriage of Heaven and Hell by A Plea for Purging
- Revival by As Hell Retreats
- Life of Defiance by Call to Preserve
- Decrease/Increase by Wrench in the Works
- Crossroads: 2010 by Bizzy Bone
- Atonement by Your Memorial
- Adherence by Stand United
- The War within Us by Onward to Olympas
- The Great Campaign of Sabotage by Overcome
- Give Me Rest by Hands
- Costs by Gideon
- Broken Voice by My Epic
- Return to Life by War of Ages
- Redirect by Your Memorial
- Now We Are Free by Leaders
- Milestone by Gideon
- Lights and Perfections by The Burial
- Conclusions by Altars
- Reach Beyond the Sun by Shai Hulud
- Die Knowing by Comeback Kid
- The Urgency by Saving Grace
- Calloused by Gideon
- Death Machine by Living Sacrifice
- Stormcrow by The Gates of Slumber
- Laid Low by Everything in Slow Motion
- Darkness Divided by Darkness Divided
