= Beyond Measure =

Beyond Measure may refer to:

- Beyond Measure (Jeremy Camp album), 2006
- Beyond Measure (Dynasty album), 2013
