= Born Blind =

American Christian punk rock band

- Origin: San Diego, California
- Genre: Christian hardcore
- Years active: 1998–2001
- Labels: Facedown, Tooth & Nail
- Past members: Judd Morgan; Kurt Love; Chris Beckett; Nate Jarrell

The Christian punk rock four-piece Born Blind was originally from San Diego, California, playing shows in the western part of the United States. All four members of the group- Judd Morgan, Chris Beckett, Kurt Love, and Nate Jarrell- were former members of No Innocent Victim before forming Born Blind. They released their debut album, Pressing On, on Facedown Records in late 1998. Their old-school hardcore sound continued on their last album One For All in mid-2000 on Tooth & Nail Records. Born Blind, toured across the United States, headlining festivals such as Cornerstone Festival and Solid State Festival; before calling it quits in January 2001.

Contrary to popular belief, none of the band members were actually blind. The band name was in reference to spiritual blindness in religious doctrine.

== Band members ==
- Judd Morgan - vocals
- Chris Beckett - bass, vocals
- Nate Jarrell - guitar, vocals
- Kurt Love - drums, vocals

== Discography ==
- Pressing On, Facedown Records (1998)
- One for All, Tooth & Nail Records (2000)
