= Lost Art of Heaping Coal =

Studio album by Wrench in the Works
- Released: August 19, 2008
- Genre: Christian metal
- Length: 35:28
- Label: Facedown

Wrench in the Works chronology
Prodigal Transmission (2005)	Lost Art of Heaping Coal (2008)

Professional ratings
Review scores
Source	Rating
Cross Rhythms	5/10
Jesusfreakhideout	3/5 stars

Lost Art of Heaping Coal is the second full-length album by the Christian metal band Wrench in the Works. The album was released on August 19, 2008, by Facedown Records.

== Track listing ==
1. "Dust Over Time Test"
2. "Tonight Is War"
3. "Our Time"
4. "Brokenness"
5. "One Foot Out of Hell"
6. "Pale Fire"
7. "Death Letter"
8. "Loaded Gun"
9. "Faith as a Virus"
10. "Lost Art of Heaping Coal"
