= Resistance (Alove for Enemies album) =

Studio album by Alove for Enemies
- Released: July 11, 2006
- Genre: Hardcore
- Label: Facedown Records
- Producer: Dean Baltulonis

Alove for Enemies chronology
The Harvest (2005)	Resistance (2006)

Professional ratings
Review scores
Source	Rating
HCS.net	4/5 link

Resistance is an album from Christian hardcore band, Alove for Enemies' on Facedown Records album. The album was produced and engineered by Dean Baltulonis.

== Track listing ==
1. "The Resistance"
2. "Tread On My Dreams"
3. "Hall Of Mirrors"
4. "Wishes For The Cloth Of Heaven"
5. "Call It Faith"
6. "EC-10"
7. "Rise Of The Phoenix"
8. "Not Without Incident"
9. "Welcome To The Underground"
10. "Emotion Is Chaos"
11. "Will Of Father"

== Credits ==
- Erich Barto - Vocals
- Dan Valentino - Guitars
- Matt Addeo - Guitars
- Jonathan Hernandez - Drums
- Luke Anthony - Bass, Vocals
- Dean Baltulonis - Producer, Engineer
- Shawn Kimon - Assistant Engineer
- Jennifer Klaverweiden - Photography
- Dave Quiggle - Artwork, Layout
