= Falling Cycle =

American Christian metal/hardcore band

- Origin: Riverside, California
- Genres: Death metal; metalcore; Christian metal
- Years active: 1999–2002
- Labels: Facedown
- Past members: Mike Shook; Sean Durham; Russ Long; Kevin Bleitz; Holden Caulfield; Russell Murray; Sean Taylor; Mike Chase

Falling Cycle was a Christian metal/Christian hardcore band from Riverside, California. They have been compared to Darkest Hour and No Innocent Victim. Guitarist Sean Durham joined Sinai Beach soon after the band broke-up.

== Musical style ==
The band originally played hardcore punk, but mainly played metalcore and death metal. Along with elements on speed metal, grind metal, and melodic death metal.

== Members ==
Last known line-up

- Mike Shook - vocals
- Sean Durham - guitar (now in Sinai Beach)
- Russ Long - guitar, backing vocals
- Kevin Bleitz - drums

Former

- Holden Caulfield - bass
- Russell Murray - guitar
- Sean Taylor - guitar
- Mike Chase - vocals
- Will Farish - drums

== Discography ==
- The Conflict (2002; Facedown)
