= The Clearing (Sleep for Sleepers album) =

Studio album by Sleep for Sleepers
- Released: May 12, 2009
- Genre: Christian alternative rock, indie rock
- Length: 47:42
- Label: Facedown Records

Sleep for Sleepers chronology
Vast (2007)	The Clearing (2009)	What Has Been Done Will Be Done Again (2010)

The Clearing is the first studio album from Sleep for Sleepers. It was released by Facedown Records on May 12, 2009.

== Critical reception ==
Professional ratings
Review scores
Source	Rating
AllMusic	3/5 stars
Christ Core	8/10
Cross Rhythms	7/10 squares
Indie Vision Music	4/5 stars
Jesus Freak Hideout	3.5/5 stars 4/5 stars

Awarding the album three stars from AllMusic, Tim DiGravina states, "it's at least an upbeat, life-affirming listen while it lasts." Andy Shaw, rating the album a seven out of ten at Cross Rhythms, says, "Sleep For Sleepers, have not come up with something completely original but there is enough in it to make it register." Giving the album three and a half stars for Jesus Freak Hideout, writes, "With thoughtful, relationship-based lyrics and a guitar-heavy sound to back it, there is a lot to like about The Clearing." Timothy Estabrooks, awarding the album four stars by Jesus Freak Hideout, describes, "The Clearing is a beautiful ride." Rating the album four stars from Indie Vision Music, Scott.L states, it "is pretty much a gimme if you're into mellow indie rock with some great pop sensibilities thrown in at times." Brian Morrissette, giving the album an eight out of ten from Christ Core, writes, "The Clearing is a diamond in the ruff".

== Track listing ==
The Clearing
No.	Title	Length
1.	"Bravery"	4:20
2.	"Thieves & Bones"	3:35
3.	"Foreign"	4:17
4.	"Keep Your Voices"	3:23
5.	"Statelines"	4:23
6.	"The Harbor"	2:55
7.	"The Fearless"	4:38
8.	"Twilight"	3:19
9.	"The Distance"	4:59
10.	"The Sea"	3:29
11.	"Love Is for the Foolish"	3:45
12.	"The Clearing"	4:39
Total length:		47:42
