= The Sick and Suffering =

Studio album by Ace Augustine
- Released: April 23, 2013
- Genre: Metalcore, Christian hardcore
- Length: 35:52
- Label: Red Cord

Ace Augustine chronology
The Absolute (2011)	The Sick and Suffering (2013)

The Sick and Suffering is the second studio album from Ace Augustine. Red Cord Records released the album on April 23, 2013.

== Critical reception ==
Professional ratings
Review scores
Source	Rating
About.com	3/5 stars
HM Magazine	3/5 stars
Indie Vision Music	3/5 stars

Awarding the album three stars from HM Magazine, Barry Stagg writes, "Ace Augustine is stuck trying to serve two masters." Chad Bowar, rating the album three stars for About.com, states, "Their music is sometimes dark, heavy and brooding, other times melodic and upbeat ... They stay mostly in the comfortable confines of the genre box, but stretch themselves periodically". Giving the album three stars at Indie Vision Music, Brody Barbour says, "'The Sick and Suffering' starts off strong, but after about the halfway point, the record loses a decent amount of steam save for a few moments."

== Track listing ==
No.	Title	Length
1.	"Despair"	0:30
2.	"Fools Gold"	4:13
3.	"Daggerboard"	4:00
4.	"Day After Day"	3:46
5.	"In the Land of Freedom..."	4:07
6.	"Deaf and Dumb"	3:46
7.	"Mannequins"	4:17
8.	"The Great Disconnect"	3:41
9.	"Growing Pains"	3:35
10.	"High Life"	3:57
Total length:		35:52
