= Another Way Home =

Studio album by Remove the Veil
- Released: October 16, 2007
- Recorded: 2006–2007
- Genres: Christian metal, Southern metal, metalcore, speed metal, thrash metal
- Length: 43:39
- Label: Facedown
- Producer: Mark Hendrix

Remove the Veil chronology
Remove the Veil EP (2006)	Another Way Home (2007)

Another Way Home is the debut and only album, by the Southern metalcore band, Remove the Veil.

== Critical reception ==
Professional ratings
Review scores
Source	Rating
Indie Vision Music	8.5/10 stars

JoshIVM wrote: "I'm so glad they stand away from the cliche southern metal vocals. Mark's raspy yelling fits perfectly and sets it apart from many of the clones out there. Although it may not be terribly original musically it is one enjoyable listen! This has been a good year for debut acts on Facedown and RTV are one of the better ones. (8.5/10)" E. Thomas of Teeth of the Divine writes: "Not too shabby, but hardly a groundbreaker either, but one of the more acceptable Southern inspired hardcore records I have heard and is certainly nipping on the heels of Maylene and the Sons of Disaster, so if you are a fan, check Remove the Veil out."

== Track listing ==
No.	Title	Length
1.	"The Crux"	3:49
2.	"A Rage Scene Retold"	3:10
3.	"Vampire"	4:19
4.	"How to Jump a Ravine"	3:12
5.	"Burn It Down"	4:32
6.	"Watuga"	3:53
7.	"Devil Child"	3:45
8.	"Wait to Wake"	4:27
9.	"The Revision"	4:13
10.	"Another Way Home"	3:44
11.	"The Secret Syndrome"	4:35
Total length:		43:39

== Credits ==
Remove the Veil

- Mark Hendrix - Vocals, guitar, bass engineer, vocal engineer, guitar engineer, producer
- Pat Hood - Guitar
- Cliff McCall - Bass
- Mark Coxwell - Drums

Production

- Mike Dresch - Audio engineer, engineer, mastering, mixing
- Eldon Fisher - Audio engineer
- Dave Quiggle - Artwork, layout design
- Lindsey Wade - Photography
