= Opposition (Altars EP) =

EP by Altars
- Released: July 19, 2011
- Genre: Christian metal, metalcore
- Length: 14:42
- Label: Strike First
- Producer: Josh Schroeder

Altars chronology
Opposition (2011)	Conclusions (2012)

Opposition is the first extended play from Altars. Strike First Records released the album on July 19, 2011.

== Critical reception ==
Professional ratings
Review scores
Source	Rating
Christ Core	3/5 stars
Cross Rhythms	7/10 squares
Indie Vision Music	4/5 stars
Jesus Freak Hideout	3.5/5 stars
Mind Equals Blown	7.0/10

Awarding the album three and a half stars from Jesus Freak Hideout, Josh Taylor states, "it's really a testament to the integrity and talent of Altars that Opposition is as solid as it is." Graeme Crawford, rating the album a seven out of ten for Cross Rhythms, writes, "But at the moment, there is maybe not enough here to stand out from the crowd." Giving the album four stars at Indie Vision Music, BMer says, "Opposition is a powerful, passionate release". Brian Morrissette, awarding the album three stars for Christ Core, describes, "Great debut EP from a young band still developing their own sound." Rating the album a seven out of ten from Mind Equal Blown, Maria Gironas states, "Truly shows how passionate the Altars are about spreading their message of their Faith."

== Track listing ==
No.	Title	Length
1.	"Opposition"	1:07
2.	"Advocate"	3:36
3.	"Severance"	2:32
4.	"The Struggler"	2:50
5.	"Heresy"	2:25
6.	"Volition"	2:16
Total length:		14:42
