= Sinai Beach =

American Christian metal band

- Origin: Riverside, California, U.S.
- Genres: Metalcore; hardcore punk; christian metal
- Years active: 2000–2017
- Labels: Victory, Facedown, Strike First
- Past members: CJ Alderson; Logan Lambert; Mike Dunlap; Sean Durham; Mike Risinger; Erik Collins; Jeff Santo; Daniel Barachkov
- Website: sinaibeach.net

Sinai Beach was a Christian metal band that was formed in Riverside, California, in 2000. The band has stated on multiple occasions that they are named after Mount Sinai, where Moses was given the Ten Commandments in the Bible.

== History ==
=== Early beginnings (2000–2006) ===
Sinai Beach was started by vocalist CJ Alderson, guitarist Logan Lambert, drummer Mike Dunlap, and bassist Jeff Santo. They recorded a four-song demo and played mostly local shows. Their recording and performances gained attention of No Innocent Victim drummer, Jason Dunn. Shortly after signing with Dunn's label, Facedown Records, guitarist Mike Risinger joined on guitar. The five began to write material for their second recording that became the band's first full release, When Breath Escapes. Vocalist CJ Alderson appeared on Zao's The Lesser Lights of Heaven DVD.

As the fan base and support continued to grow Sinai Beach started to receive interest from several well-known heavy music labels and eventually signed with Chicago-based Victory Records. This allowed them the opportunity to tour with bands such as Zao, As I Lay Dying, Norma Jean, Haste the Day, Still Remains, Himsa, Bleeding Through, Comeback Kid and Terror. After several US and European tours, Sinai Beach released their second full album Immersed.

=== Hiatus and resurrection (2006–2017) ===
Sinai Beach is listed as "Artist Alumni" on the Victory Records website and several of the members have moved away and married since the band last played together live. Sean Durham and Erik Collins both joined the band in 2006 following the departure of Santo and the brief hiatus of Risinger. Dunlap and Lambert still reside in the Riverside area, while Risinger, Durham and Collins are in the surrounding area. Alderson moved to North Carolina in 2009.

In 2013, it was announced the band would headline at Facedown Festival on March 28, 2014, where the band announced their "resurrection". In 2017, Lambert did an interview with Indie Vision Music, in which he stated that the band was done, though no official statement was released. He said that the reunion at Facedown Fest was their last show.

== Influences ==
Early influences of the band include Overcome, Zao, Strongarm, Throwdown, and Living Sacrifice. But the members have stated that influences changed in later years to include Black Label Society, The Cult and Pantera, although have admitted in times past that they are heavily into death metal bands such as Suffocation, Nile, and Aborted.

== Members ==
Final lineup

- Courtney "CJ" Alderson – vocals (2000–2017)
- Logan Lambert – lead guitar (2000–2017)
- Sean Durham – rhythm guitar (2006–2017) (ex-Falling Cycle)
- Mike Risinger – rhythm guitar (2001–2006, 2014–2017) (ex-Falling Cycle)
- Erik Collins – bass (2006–2017)
- Mike Dunlap – drums (2000–2017)

Former members

- Jeff Santo – bass (2001–2006)
- Daniel Barachkov – bass (2006)

Timeline

== Discography ==
Studio albums

- When Breath Escapes (Facedown Records; 2003)
- Immersed (Victory Records; 2005) U.S. No. 198

EPs

- Wolves in Sheeps Clothing (Strike First Records; 2001)
