= Flesh and Blood (No Innocent Victim album) =

Studio album by No Innocent Victim
- Released: March 23, 1999
- Recorded: November 1998
- Genre: Hardcore punk, Christian hardcore
- Label: Victory

No Innocent Victim chronology
The Crazy Engler Brothers (1999)	Flesh and Blood (1999)	Tipping the Scales (2001)

Professional ratings
Review scores
Source	Rating
Allmusic	link

Flesh and Blood is the fifth full-length album by hardcore punk band No Innocent Victim. It was released in 1999 on Victory Records.

== Track listing ==
1. "Flesh and Blood" – 2:28
2. "C.E.B." – 2:14
3. "My Beliefs" – 1:54
4. "Answer to No One" – 1:33
5. "Never Face Defeat" – 2:18
6. "All for the Color" – 1:37
7. "Whitewashed Tomb" – 1:43
8. "Till the End" – 2:40
9. "As I Fight" – 1:57
10. "Tear Us Apart" – 1:57 (feat. Bruce Fitzhugh of Living Sacrifice)
11. "Pushed Aside" – 1:48
12. "Death Grip" – 2:36
