= Nothing Left (band) =

American metalcore band

- Origin: United States
- Genres: Metalcore, hardcore punk
- Years active: 2016–present
- Labels: Nuclear Blast, Facedown
- Members: Ryan Leitru; Brandon Leitru; Danon Saylor; Alex Camarena; Devin Henderson
- Website: Nothing Left on Facebook

Nothing Left is an American supergroup that formed in 2016. The band played their first shows in Europe.

== Background ==
Nothing Left formed in 2016, following the announced disbanding of the band For Today. The band opened for For Today on the European leg of the Farewell Tour. The band also consists of members of A Bullet for Pretty Boy, Silent Planet and Take It Back!. The band is now signed to Facedown Records and released their debut EP, Destroy and Rebuild, on April 21, 2017. The band released their debut album, Disconnected, on December 13, 2019.

== Band members ==
Current

- Danon Saylor – vocals (2016–present) (A Bullet for Pretty Boy)
- Ryan Leitru – guitar, vocals (2016–present) (For Today)
- Brandon Leitru – guitar, (2016–present) (For Today)
- Alex Camarena – drums (2016–present) (Silent Planet)
- Devin Henderson – bass (2017–present) (Take It Back!)

Live

- Cody Bradley – bass (2016–2017) (Take It Back!)

== Discography ==
Studio albums

- Disconnected (2019)

EPs

- Destroy and Rebuild (2017)

Singles

- "Hands of Death" (2016; Nuclear Blast)
