= Tipping the Scales =

Studio album by No Innocent Victim
- Released: May 22, 2001
- Recorded: Jan 25–Feb 8, 2001
- Genre: Hardcore punk, punk rock, metalcore
- Label: Victory, Solid State

No Innocent Victim chronology
Flesh and Blood (1999)	Tipping the Scales (2001)	To Burn Again (2005)

Professional ratings
Review scores
Source	Rating
Allmusic	1.5/5 stars

Tipping the Scales is the sixth full-length album by Christian hardcore punk band No Innocent Victim. It was released in 2001 on Victory Records and Solid State Records.

== Track listing ==
1. "Degeneration" - 2:05
2. "Tipping the Scales" - 1:51
3. "Illusion" - 2:31
4. "Forward" - 1:51
5. "Cast Down" - 2:15
6. "Dead Weight" - 1:27
7. "Mr. Philosophy" - 2:28
8. "Calm Before the Storm" - 2:27
9. "Raping the Mind" - 2:01
10. "Will to Live" - 1:38
11. "Reunion" - 1:41
