= Conclusions (album) =

Studio album by Altars
- Released: June 5, 2012
- Genre: Christian metal, metalcore
- Length: 32:13
- Label: Facedown
- Producer: Altars, Seth Munson

Altars chronology
Opposition (2011)	Conclusions (2012)	Something More (2013)

Conclusions is the first studio album from Altars. Facedown Records released the album on June 5, 2012. Altars worked with Seth Munson in the production of this album.

== Critical reception ==
Professional ratings
Review scores
Source	Rating
Cross Rhythms	6/10 squares
HM Magazine	3/5 stars
Indie Vision Music	3/5 stars
Jesus Freak Hideout	3.5/5 stars
The New Review	2.5/5 stars

Awarding the album three stars from HM Magazine, David Stagg states, "Conclusions grew on me." Christian Cunningham, rating the album a six out of ten for Cross Rhythms, writes, "'Conclusions' descends into decidedly average riffing." Giving the album three and a half stars at Jesus Freak Hideout, Michael Weaver says, "At times they shine and at others the sound isn't much more than generic hardcore." Brody Barbour, indicating in a three star review by Indie Vision Music, describes, "Conclusions is nothing extremely out of the norm". Signaling in a two and a half star review by The New Review, Max Grundström states, "Song quality rapidly declines the closer you get to the end of Conclusions".

== Track listing ==
No.	Title	Length
1.	"Red Brick Army"	2:10
2.	"Scum"	2:44
3.	"The Coward"	4:01
4.	"Portlen"	1:23
5.	"Lower"	3:34
6.	"Unknowing"	2:46
7.	"Ryland"	1:32
8.	"Montreal"	3:01
9.	"Shepherds"	2:54
10.	"Revelation"	3:32
11.	"Realization"	1:03
12.	"Conclusions"	3:33
Total length:		32:13
