= We the Gathered =

American Christian hardcore band

- Origin: Johnstown, Pennsylvania
- Genres: Christian hardcore, metalcore, melodic hardcore
- Years active: 2010–present
- Labels: Strike First
- Members: Lance; Randy; Kyle; Josh; Spencer
- Past members: Stephan; Andy
- Website: facebook.com/wethegathered

We the Gathered is an American Christian hardcore, classified as a melodic hardcore and a melodic metalcore group, from Johnstown, Pennsylvania. The band started making music in 2010, and their members at the time are Lance, Randy, Kyle, Josh, and Spencer. They released, an extended play, We the Gathered, in 2010. Their first studio album, Believer, was released by Strike First Records, in 2011. The subsequent album, Daydreamers, was an independent release, in 2013.

== Background ==
We the Gathered is a Christian hardcore and Christian metal band from Johnstown, Pennsylvania. Their members are Lance, Randy, Kyle, Josh, and Spencer.

== Music history ==
The band commenced as a musical entity in 2010, with their first release, We the Gathered, an extended play, that was released by independently, on September 13, 2010. Their first studio album, Believer, was released by Strike First Records, on October 25, 2011. The subsequent album, Daydreamers, was released independently, on March 5, 2013.

== Members ==
Current members

- Lance
- Randy
- Kyle
- Josh
- Spencer

== Discography ==
Albums

- Believer (October 25, 2011, Strike First)
- Daydreamer (March 5, 2013, Independent)

EPs

- We the Gathered (September 13, 2010, Independent)
