= Through Solace =

Welsh Christian hardcore/metal band

- Origin: Wales, United Kingdom
- Genres: Christian hardcore, metalcore, post-rock
- Years active: 2005–2010
- Label: Strike First
- Past members: Luke Nicholas; Robert Milligan; Kevin Williams; Rohan Bishop; Kingsley Davies; Sean Fletcher
- Website: facebook.com/pages/Through-Solace/45585988542

Through Solace is a Welsh Christian hardcore and Christian metal band, and they primarily play hardcore punk, metalcore, post-hardcore, and post-metal. They come from Wales, United Kingdom. The band started making music in 2005, while they disbanded in 2010, and their members were Rohan Bishop, Robert Milligan, Luke Nicholas, Kevin Williams, Kingsley Davis, and Sean Fletcher. Their first two releases, extended plays, Through Solace in 2006, and, The Stand in 2008, were independently released by the band. The band released, a studio album, The World on Standby, in 2009 with Strike First Records.

== Background ==
Through Solace was a Christian hardcore and Christian metal band from Wales, United Kingdom. Their members were Rohan Bishop, Robert Milligan, Luke Nicholas, Kevin Williams, Kingsley Davis, and Sean Fletcher.

== Music history ==
The band commenced as a musical entity in 2005, with their first two releases, being independently released extended plays, Through Solace, in 2006, and, The Stand, in 2008. Their first studio album, The World on Standby, was released by Strike First Records, on 28 April 2008.

== Members ==
- Luke Nicholas – lead vocals
- Rob Milligan – guitar, background vocals
- Kevin Williams – guitar
- Rohan Bishop – bass
- Sean Fletcher – drums
- Kingsley Davies – drums

== Post breakup ==
Rohan Bishop joined the 80's inspired band, The Vestals with Adam Parslow (Now of The Nightmares). He previously had stints with Brutality Will Prevail.

Kevin Williams formed the Welsh post-hardcore band, Calling Apollo. They released a well-received double-release, named, 'The Great Depression'.

Sean Fletcher joined the South Wales police force.

== Discography ==
Studio albums

- The World on Standby (April 28, 2009, Strike First)
