= Inked in Blood (band) =

American metalcore band

- Origin: Portland, Oregon, U.S.
- Genres: Christian metalcore, melodic hardcore, post-hardcore
- Years active: 2003–2007
- Label: Facedown
- Past members: Joey Trump; Matt McDonnell; Steven Gosvener; Kelly Mullinix; Stephen Poole; Andy Rice; Chris Espinoza; Blake Hooper; Matt Thornton; Brian James Bugge; Chris Jolliff
- Website: facebook.com/pages/Inked-In-Blood/

Inked in Blood was an American Christian metalcore and melodic hardcore group. They come from Portland, Oregon. The band started making music in 2001 and disbanded in 2007. Their first show was December 2001 in Portland with Knives Out. The band released two demos, one extended play, Awakening Vesuvius, in 2004. Their first studio album, Lay Waste the Poets, was released by Facedown Records, in 2005. The subsequent studio album, Sometimes We Are Beautiful, was released by Facedown Records, in 2007, as their final recording.

== History ==
The band commenced as a musical entity in 2001. Their first release, Awakening Vesuvius, an extended play, was released on June 1, 2004. Some sources claim Awakening Vesuvius was released by Rainstorm Productions and re issued by Strike First Records or Strike First Records. They released a studio album, Lay Waste the Poets, on November 8, 2005, with Facedown Records. Their second studio album, Sometimes We Are Beautiful, was released by Facedown Records on October 2, 2007.

Their final lineup was vocalist Joey Trump, guitarists Matt McDonnell and Kelly Mullinix, bassist Steven Gosvener, and drummer Stephen Poole.

== Members ==
Final lineup

- Joey Trump - vocals
- Matt McDonnell - guitar
- Steven Gosvener - bass
- Kelly Mullinix - guitar, vocals
- Stephen Poole - drums (formerly of Society's Finest)

== Discography ==
Studio albums

- Lay Waste the Poets (November 8, 2005, Facedown)
- Sometimes We Are Beautiful (October 2, 2007, Facedown)

Extended plays

- Awakening Vesuvius (2004, Strike First)
