= Down with the Ship =

EP by xLooking Forwardx
- Released: June 19, 2012
- Genre: Christian hardcore, hardcore punk
- Length: 11:27
- Label: Facedown

Down with the Ship is the first extended play from xLooking Forwardx. Facedown Records released the EP on June 19, 2012.

== Critical reception ==
Professional ratings
Review scores
Source	Rating
HM Magazine	3/5 stars
Indie Vision Music	4/5 stars
Jesus Freak Hideout	4.5/5 stars 4/5 stars

Awarding the EP three stars from HM Magazine, David Stagg writes, "I think that's a good place for a old-school hardcore band testing the waters with a new EP." Michael Weaver, giving the album four and a half stars for Jesus Freak Hideout, states, "they are still legitimate after twelve years." Rating the album four stars at Jesus Freak Hideout, Scott Fryberger describes, "If you've been a fan of the band or you like hardcore punk in general, you'll love Down With The Ship". Steven Cosand, awarding the album four stars by Indie Vision Music, says, "Some might argue that Down With The Ship doesn’t do anything to challenge the current wave of trends in hardcore."

== Track listing ==
No.	Title	Length
1.	"Intro"	0:29
2.	"The Fast and the Spurious"	1:19
3.	"Down with the Ship"	1:57
4.	"Here I Am"	2:04
5.	"Betting Back with Your 'X'"	1:03
6.	"Put Up or Shut Up"	2:01
7.	"Demanding Answers"	2:08
8.	"Outro"	0:34
Total length:		11:27
