= Jesus Wept (band) =

American Christian rock band

- Origin: Erie, Pennsylvania, U.S.
- Genres: Christian hardcore; Christian punk; Christian metal; metalcore
- Years active: 2004–present
- Labels: Strike First
- Members: Dan Quiggle; Dave Quiggle; Sean Sundy; Jon Beckman; Adam Salaga

Jesus Wept is an American Christian rock band who primarily play hardcore punk, metalcore, post-hardcore, and post-metal. They come from Erie, Pennsylvania. The band started making music in 2004, and their members are Dan Quiggle, Dave Quiggle, Sean Sundy, Jon Beckman, and Adam Salaga. Their first extended play, Sick City, was released by Strike First Records in 2006. The band released a studio album, Show's Over, in 2006, with Strike First Records.

== Background ==
Jesus Wept is a Christian hardcore and Christian metal band from Erie, Pennsylvania. Their members are vocalist, Dan Quiggle, guitarists Dave Quiggle and Sean Sundy, bassist Jon Beckham, and drummer Adam Salaga. All the members of Jesus Wept were former members of xDisciplex A.D.

== Music history ==
The band commenced as a musical entity in 2004, with their first release, being an extended play, Sick City, released by Strike First Records, in 2006. The first studio album, Show's Over, was released on April 11, 2006, by Strike First Records.

== Members ==
Current members

- Dan Quiggle - vocals
- Dave Quiggle - guitar
- Sean Sundy - guitar
- Jon Beckman - bass
- Adam Salaga - drums

== Discography ==
Studio albums

- Show's Over (April 11, 2006, Strike First)

EPs

- Sick City (2004, Independent)
