= What We Do in Secret =

American Christian hardcore band

What We Do In Secret
- Also known as: WWDIS
- Origin: Memphis, Tennessee, U.S.
- Genres: Christian metal, metalcore, Christian hardcore, hardcore punk
- Years active: 2012–present
- Labels: Independent, Facedown Records
- Members: Josh Adams; Clay Crenshaw; Frank Forbes
- Past members: Nathan Moody; Sean Flowers; Austin Barnes; Aaron Kadura; Luke Kendall; Drew Nance; Blake Peel; Devin Harris
- Website: What We Do In Secret on Facebook

What We Do In Secret is an American Christian hardcore band from Memphis, Tennessee. They have toured with bands such as War of Ages, Phinehas, Silent Planet, Sleepwave, We Came As Romans, '68, For Today and Norma Jean. They have released two EPs.

== History ==
What We Do In Secret was formed in Memphis in March 2012 by Josh Adams, Drew Nance, Devin Harris and Nathan Moody. They recorded their first EP, New Eyes, and released it on August 31, 2013.

Moody left the band after this and was replaced by Clay Crenshaw and Austin Barnes. The band's second EP, The Migration, was released on September 16, 2014, and was produced by Bobby Lynge of Fit for a King. This EP received a 4 Stars review from Scott Swan on the Indie Vision Music website.

WWDIS has managed to create a "put together" sounding record, while leaving enough chaos to still push boundaries. I can't think of a lot critical things to say about this EP, only the fact that the last track was a little bit of a downer for me. Even if you don't think this genre is for you, I would recommend you still give this record a listen. It might just change your mind.

After recording The Migration, Barnes left the band in 2014 and was replaced by the guitarist Sean Flowers. Flowers left the band in late 2014. On May 23, 2015, the band released its second music video, "Water It Down". It was covered on HM magazine. The vocalist, Adams, describes the song:

'Water It Down' is about hitting bottom and feeling broken. When you get that low and feel broken to pieces, drowning in what you're going through, God is always there, the second you ask, to put you back together. No matter where you have been, what you have done, or whom you have caused to sink alongside you or instead of you, the grace and mercy of God is way better and will always take you to better places.

The guitarist, Aaron Kadura, formerly of Fit for a King, joined the band and played his first show with them on July 15, 2015. Kadura was replaced later that year by Luke Kendall. The band is currently recording its first full-length album, due to be released in summer 2016.

On July 26, 2017, it was announced that Drummer Devin Harris would depart from the band. On July 30, 2017, he performed his last show with the band.

On October 4, 2019, the band announced they had signed with Facedown Records and are set to release their debut album, Repose.

== Influences ==
On Facebook, they have stated their influences as Norma Jean, Every Time I Die, Underoath, Stray from the Path, Botch, Feed the Rhino, Converge, Letlive, Glassjaw, Sleeping Giant, Thrice and The Chariot.

== Members ==
Current members

- Josh Adams - lead vocals (2012–present)
- Clay Crenshaw - guitars, bass (2013–present)
- Frank Forbes - drums (2018–present)

Former members

- Sean Flowers - rhythm guitar (2014)
- Austin Barnes - rhythm guitar, backing vocals (2013-2014)
- Nathan Moody - guitars (2012-2013)
- Aaron Kadura - rhythm guitar (2015)
- Luke Kendall - rhythm guitar, backing vocals (2015–2016)
- Drew Nance - bass, backing vocals (2012–2017)
- Blake Peel - bass, drums, backing vocals (2017-2018)
- Devin Harris - drums (2012–2017)

Touring members

- Colten Biggs - lead guitar (2015)

Timeline

== Discography ==
EPs

- New Eyes (August 31, 2013; independent)
- The Migration (August 16, 2014; independent)

Studio albums

- Repose (November 22, 2019; Facedown Records)

Music videos

- "No Shelter" (2014)
- "Water It Down" (2014)

Compilation appearances

- Metal From The Dragon (Vol. 1) (2016; The Bearded Dragon Productions)

== See also ==
- Fit for a King
- Christian Metal
- Christian hardcore
