= The Absolute (album) =

Studio album by Ace Augustine
- Released: January 18, 2011
- Genre: Metalcore, Christian hardcore
- Length: 41:06
- Label: Strike First
- Producer: Alex Koppenheffer

Ace Augustine chronology
The Glory of Trumpets (2008)	The Absolute (2011)	The Sick and Suffering (2013)

The Absolute is the first studio album from Ace Augustine. Strike First Records released the album on January 18, 2011. Ace Augustine worked with Alex Koppenheffer, in the production of this album.

== Critical reception ==
Professional ratings
Review scores
Source	Rating
Cross Rhythms	6/10 squares
HM Magazine	5/5 stars
Indie Vision Music	3/5 stars
Jesus Freak Hideout	3.5/5 stars 2.5/5 stars
Mind Equals Blown	6.0/10
The New Review	4/5 stars

Awarding the album three and a half stars for Jesus Freak Hideout, Wayne Reimer states, "The Absolute is by no means flawless, but it's honest and shows real potential." Michael Weaver, rating the album two and a half stars at Jesus Freak Hideout, says, "the release seems to feature a band suffering from an identity crisis." Giving the album five stars from HM Magazine, Matthew Leonard writes, "Each song is unique in its sound with phenomenal technical guitar work, raspy mid-high range vocals, harmonized singing, and drumming that's so fast you gotta wonder if it's a drum machine." Peter John Willoughby, rating the album a six out of ten for Cross Rhythms, says, "Whilst they haven't developed their own distinctive sound, it doesn't detract from their raw energy." Awarding the album three stars from Indie Vision Music, Joshua Clark states, "a pretty solid debut album." Dylan Powell, giving the album a six out of ten at Mind Equals Blown, writes, "The Absolute isn't a bad record." Keith Anderson, giving the album four stars by The New Review, writes, "They bring a ton of technical magic to the album, but their sound is fresh enough my ear canals swallow them like a black hole consumes planets."

== Track listing ==
All tracks are written by Ace Augustine, Tyler Chadwick, Doug Fellenbaum, and Ben Moser

No.	Title	Length
1.	"Justifiers"	3:42
2.	"2013 Looks Promising"	4:22
3.	"Jonah Spoke of Innocence"	4:26
4.	"Negotiations"	4:08
5.	"Senior Year at Sky City"	3:30
6.	"Delorean"	3:42
7.	"Axiom"	5:09
8.	"The Debt That All Men Pay"	3:48
9.	"The Merchant Tales"	4:35
10.	"The Absolute"	3:44
Total length:		41:06
