= Sleep for Sleepers =

- Also known as: The Red Coterie
- Origin: Whittier, California, U.S.
- Genres: Christian alternative rock, indie rock
- Years active: 2004–present
- Labels: Facedown Records, Dreamt Records
- Members: Jamey Price; Chad Jordan
- Past members: Christopher Scott Kellogg; Jeffrey Thomas Darcy
- Website: facebook.com/SleepForSleepers

Sleep for Sleepers were an American Christian alternative rock band, also defined as an alternative rock and indie rock band. The band formed in Whittier, California in 2004. The current lineup consists of vocalist and guitarist Jamey Price and drummer Chad Jordan, the latter of whom joined in mid-2013. The original lineup consisted of guitarist Chris Kellogg, bassist Jamey Price, and drummer Jeff Darcy.

== Background ==
Sleep for Sleepers, formerly The Red Coterie, was a Christian alternative rock band from Whittier, California. From 2004 to 2010, their lineup consisted of Jamey Price on bass and vocals, Chris Kellogg on guitar, and Jeff Darcy on drums, until the band was dropped from Facedown Records in late 2010 and Darcy and Kellogg left the band. Price continued the project by himself, releasing the independent EP Conditions in 2011, with Chad Jordan eventually joining the band as a drummer in 2013. After a brief West Coast tour in 2013-14, and the subsequent release of the album Discovery in June 2014, the project dissolved with Price and Jordan moving on to other projects.

== History ==
The Red Coterie formed in 2004 in Whittier, California with bassist Jamey Price, guitarist Chris Kellogg, and drummer Jeff Darcy. The band independently released their debut EP as The Red Coterie, entitled Vast, in 2007. In 2008, they signed with Facedown Records and changed their name to Sleep For Sleepers. Their debut album The Clearing was released through Facedown Records on May 12, 2009. Their follow-up EP, Everything That Has Happened Will Happen Again, was released on Facedown Records in June 2010. After being dropped from Facedown Records in late 2010, Jamey Price (as Sleep For Sleepers) signed with Dreamt Records and released another extended play, Conditions, in 2011 on the label. Their subsequent album, also released by Dreamt Records, Discovery, was released in 2014.

== Members ==
Current

- Jamey Price — vocals, guitar (2004 — 2014)
- Chad Jordan — drums (2013 — 2014)

Former

- Chris Kellogg — guitar (2004 — 2010)
- Jeff Darcy — drums, backing vocals (2004 — 2010)

Timeline

== Discography ==
Studio albums

- The Clearing (May 12, 2009, Dreamt)
- Discovery (June 17, 2014, Dreamt)

EPs

- Vast (2007, Independent)
- What Has Been Done Will Be Done Again (2010, Facedown Records)
- Conditions (September 13, 2011, Dreamt)

Compilation albums

- Division: A Collection Of B-Sides (November 15, 2011, Independent)
