= Point of Recognition =

American Christian hardcore band

- Also known as: P.O.R.
- Origin: Inland Empire, California
- Genres: Hardcore punk; Christian hardcore; Christian metal; Metalcore
- Years active: 1998–2002; 2007
- Labels: Rescue Records; Facedown Records
- Past members: Aaron Irizarry; Tim Lambesis; Mike Kelly; Isaac Morton; Jesse Covington; Tim Cordova; Ryan Mowbray; Tim Mason; John Tole; Leighton Cressman; Jason Barbato; Jason Applegate; Tim Etters; Jordan Mancino

Point of Recognition was a Christian hardcore band from Southern California. They take their influences from bands such as All Out War, Buried Alive, No Innocent Victim, and Hatebreed. The name Point of Recognition is based on the defining moment when a person comes to faith in Christ.

== History ==
Point of Recognition had been playing for about a year before releasing their debut album Admiration of a Son on Rescue Records in 1999. Four of their songs were also included on a 3-way split CD, titled Now the Tables Have Turned, on Facedown Records (along with Torn In Two and Cast In Stone). The band toured constantly before releasing their second album Refresh, Renew on Facedown Records. With the heavier sound from the Refresh, Renew album, the band toured with the likes of H_{2}O, All Out War, Throwdown, No Innocent Victim (Southern California neighbors with whom they perform often), among many others, quickly gaining fan support. However, there were soon lineup changes. With No Innocent Victim and former Dodgin' Bullets guitarist Tim Mason joining the group in 2002, the band would release their final album Day Of Defeat in June of that year.

The band called it quits in October 2002 in order for the members to pursue other interests, musical and/or family interests. In January 2007, it was announced that Point of Recognition would reunite for Facedown Fest 2007 on March 24.

== Members ==
Last known lineup

- Aaron Irizarry – vocals (1998–2002, 2007)
- Jason Barbato – vocals, bass (2002, 2007)
- Tim Cordova – guitar (2000–2002, 2007)
- Jesse Covington – guitar (1998–2001, 2002, 2007)
- Leighton Cressman – drums (2001–2002, 2007)

Former

- Jason Applegate – vocals (1998–2000)
- Tim Lambesis – guitar (AILD) (2001)
- Tim Mason – guitar (2002) (ex-Dodgin' Bullets, ex-No Innocent Victim)
- Tim Etters – guitar
- Isaac Morton – bass (1998–2000)
- Ryan Mowbray – bass (2000–2001)
- John "Lockjaw" Tole – bass (Pitboss 2000) (2001–2002)
- Mike Kelly – drums (1998–2001)
- Jordan Mancino – drums (AILD) (2001)

Timeline

== Discography ==
Studio albums

- Admiration of a Son (Rescue Records, 1999)
- Refresh, Renew (Facedown Records, 2000)
- Day of Defeat (Facedown Records, 2002)

Splits

- Now the Tables Have Turned (Rescue, 1998)
- Figure Four & Point of Recognition (Facedown, 2001)
