= Count to Four =

American rock band

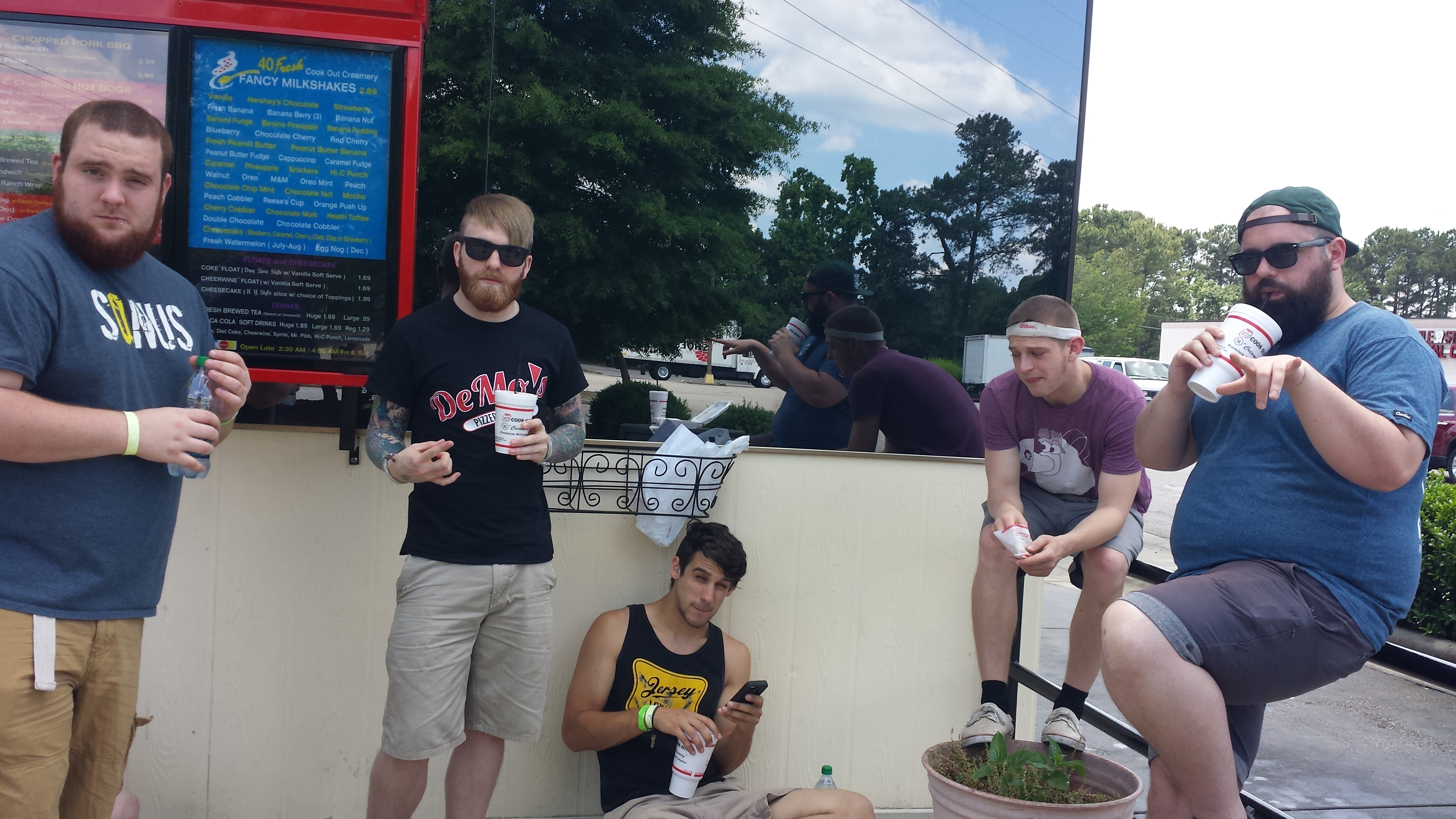
- Count to Four eating at Cook Out in Raleigh, North Carolina, on May 26, 2014

Background information
- Origin: Catskill, New York
- Years active: 2009 - present (active)
- Members: Pete Adams; Jay Miller; Neale Dimento; Aaron Mong
- Past members: Paul Parado; Vini Stamato; Mike Hayden; Brian Palmer
- Website: https://www.facebook.com/counttofour

Count to Four are an American progressive pop-punk band. Initially founded in 2009, the band did not release material or push social media sites until 2010 at which point their lineup was solidified. Since inception, Count to Four recorded and self-released three EPs and a full-length studio album from the beginning of 2010 to the end of 2013. Currently the band is unsigned but under Kolossal Management with booking and PR teams.

== History ==
=== Formation and the self-titled EP (late 2009 - early 2010) ===
The band formed when singer Mike Hayden and drummer Pete Adams started playing songs together. They both realized they had an affinity for pop punk music, namely Fall Out Boy. They soon after brought in bassist Paul Porado and began writing material. In late 2009 the band brought guitarist Jay Miller in and recorded a self-titled EP at Old Soul Studios. The EP was released on Myspace and Bandcamp for free downloads, before ultimately being taken down by the band. The band currently claims that they are mainly influenced by the bands Fall Out Boy, Rufio, Jimmy Eat World, August Burns Red and blink-182.

=== Know Where You Come From (early 2010 - early 2011) ===
April 2010 the band recorded their second EP at 37 Studios with Producer / Engineer Matt Dalton The band also mutually parted ways bassist Paul Porado and brought in new bass guitarist Vini Stamto. The EP provided what the song "Growing Up and Growing Beards" as well as a crowd favorite "We Don't Have Good Days Anymore," both songs of which are still found in the band's live set. The EP also contained the ballad "No It's A Pattern," its title being a clever answer to the previous EP's track 3 question - (see Discography section). The band saw some mild success from the album, landing some showcases with larger national acts, and selling nearly 2000 digital downloads via Bandcamp. They were also featured on a few smaller blog sites, such as Tumblr blog "Fuck Yeah Pop Punk" and DyingScene.com

=== Acoustic EP (2011–2013) ===
Right before going back into the studio to record their first full-length album, in October 2011 the band again mutually parted ways with their 2nd bass player. Meanwhile, the band self-recorded and surprise released a 4 track acoustic record. The EP contained an acoustic version of "Growing Up and Growing Beards" previously released off of Know Where You Come From. It also contained two previously unreleased tracks, "Tear It Apart (Acoustic)" and "Beamquake." They also added an acoustic rendition of the "Pokémon Theme Song" made popular by the Pokémon TV Series. The band even went as far as creating a Pokémon themed teeshirt, and often discussed their love for the video games in interviews, hence why they covered the song Aside from this song receiving some viral traction due to the popularity of the franchise, the Acoustic EP was an album seemed to be brushed under the rug, as it did not receive much press attention and was given away as a free download.

=== Between Two Cities (2013 - present) ===
Almost immediately after releasing their acoustic record, Count to Four returned to 37 Studios to work again with Matt Dalton on their first full-length record they titled "Between Two Cities." Although recorded in November 2011, the album wasn't released until April 2013. The band attributed the long delay to "road blocks" in post-recording and a "rigorous touring schedule" as they toured for almost the whole of 2012.

The band often talk in interviews about the concept behind the album title and how it tied into the album art and lyrical content. The entire album conceptually is a struggle between who a person was and who they are trying to be - torn between two stages of your life. The "two cities" also for the band represent NY and Philadelphia, due to that half of their members were living in each city while they were recording the album.

==== Prior To release ====
In late February 2013 the band announced the release of the long-awaited and anticipated record, and released a new track "I Hope Not" for streaming via Bandcamp. Several weeks before the record's release, the band premiered another new song and their first ever music video for the song "Lavender Town". A week before release another new song titled "Bottles and Books" was released via a lyric video on MTV Buzzworthy The success of the music video secured the band's first international physical distribution of their album in a small record shop in Japan.

==== After release ====
Between Two Cities is Count to Four's best selling release to date. Critics gave the album positive reviews in its first week of release. PR giants Property of Zack claimed the album to be "quintessential pop-punk at its finest"
while MTV claimed the "throwback vibe was uniquely refreshing." The album topped the Bandcamp punk charts at #1 and secured a slot on the Bandcamp the overall best sellers at #3 in its first week of release. It is still in the top 10 most artist recommend punk albums on Bandcamp.

After releasing another lyric video for the song "Get To It," Count to Four released a compilation of video track-by-track commentaries through 10 different sites over 10 days (1 site per song). They then followed up with a national tour deemed the "Aint No Country Wide Enough" tour.

Shortly after returning home from tour, they went on to film another music video in late 2013 for their second single and opening track "I Hope Not." The video was picked up by MTV producers and placed in rotation on MTVU. The band also earned the runner up position for the fan voted mtvU Freshman award.

=== IndieGoGo campaign and name change ===
Count to Four planned made plans to tour and release another album after singer Mike Hayden departed the band to pursue grad school.

They ran an IndieGoGo Campaign to help raise money for a new album and successfully raised over $15,000. With that money, they recorded a full length with producer Taylor Larson without a singer.

They ran open vocal tryouts with the aid of Spencer Sotello of Periphery. Through the vocal tryouts, they acquired Lucas Cote, who quickly left for personal reasons. Since then, they changed the band name to Neverkept officially and brought in Dorian Cooke as the main vocalist, who is also the guitarist of Broadside and Former Vocalist of Battleghost.

== Members ==
Current members

- Pete Adams - Drums (2010–present)
- Jay Miller - Rhythm Guitar/ Backing Vox (2010–present)
- Neale DiMento - Bass / Backing Vox (2011–present)
- Aaron Mong - Guitar/Backing Vox (2016–Present)
- Dorian Cooke - Vocals (2018–Present)

Touring members

- Aaron Mong - Vocals (2015)
- Dorian Cooke - Vocals (2015)
- Blake Horner - Lead Guitar (2015)

Previous members

- Paul Parado - Bass (2010)
- Vini Stamato - Bass (2010–2011)
- Mike Hayden - Vocals / Lead Guitar (2010–2014)
- Brian Palmer - Piano (2010)
- Lucas Cote- Vocals (2016–2018)

== Discography ==
- Count to Four - EP (2009)
- Know Where You Come From - EP (2010)
- Acoustic EP (2011)
- Between Two Cities - (2013) [Studio Album]
