= XDISCIPLEx A.D. =

American Christian hardcore band

xdisciplex a.d.
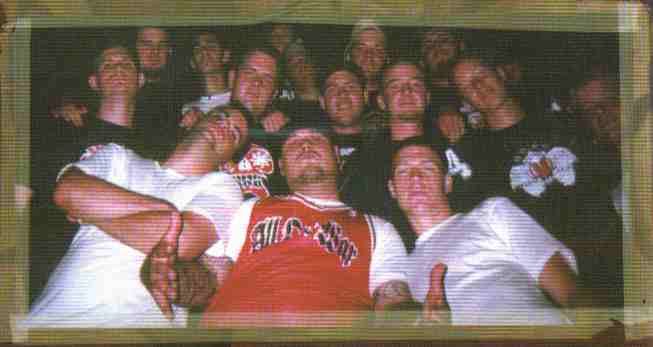
- Members of xDisciplex A.D. standing amongst a crowd of other individuals in 2001.

Background information
- Also known as: xdisciplex, disciple, xDisciplex (AD)
- Origin: Erie, Pennsylvania
- Genres: Christian hardcore, metalcore
- Years active: 1995–2004
- Labels: Goodfellow, Triple Crown, Facedown, I Scream, Angelskin Media, Good Life
- Past members: Dan Quiggle; Dave Quiggle; Adam Salaga; Neil Hartman; Brian Oborski; Joe Vogel; Sean Sundy; Jon Beckman; Matt Salusky

xDISCIPLEx A.D. was a straight edge Christian hardcore band from Erie, Pennsylvania.

Formerly xdisciplex or disciple, the band had to change its name in November 2000 to avoid legal actions due to the already-established Christian metal band Disciple. They released albums with Goodfellow Records, Triple Crown Records and Facedown Records. The band often played in Ontario, Canada, due to its connections with the Buffalo/Hamilton hardcore scene and Goodfellow Records/Redstar Records. In March 2000, Good Life Recordings announced a long-delayed split 7-inch vinyl between Disciple and melodic hardcore band As Friends Rust. The split, which had been in development since 1998, was scheduled to use the December 1997 recording of Disciple's "Candy Apple", a song with pro-life lyrics, while As Friends Rust contributed a November 1996 recording of "The Only Point", a song with pro-choice lyrics. However, the split was blocked by ex-As Friends Rust guitarist Henry Olmino, who had since become a pro-life supporter, and opposed the use of the song.

After they disbanded, Dan Quiggle, Dave Quiggle, and Adam Salaga started another band called Jesus Wept, while Neil Hartman joined No Innocent Victim. Dave Quiggle moved to California during the summer of 2005 and also joined No Innocent Victim and works for Facedown Records doing design.

Members of xDISCIPLEx A.D. also played in the bands Anchor, Dodgin' Bullets and Shockwave.

== Members ==
=== Last known lineup ===
- Dan Quiggle – vocals (1995–2004)
- Dave Quiggle – guitar (1995–2004)
- Neil Hartman – bass (2001–2004)
- Adam Salaga – drums (1996–2004)

=== Former members ===
- Joe Vogel – guitar (1995–2001)
- Matt Salusky – drums (1995–1996)
- Brian Oborski – bass (1995–2001)
- Sean Sundy – guitar
- Jon Beckman – bass

== Discography ==
EPs

- Lantern (1996)
- Scarab (1997)
- Blood Feud (2003, Facedown)

Splits

- I Stand Alone (2000, I Stand Alone; with Stretch Arm Strong)

Studio albums

- Imitation of Love (1998, Goodfellow)
- No Blood, No Altar Now (1999, Goodlife)
- Heaven and Hell (2000, Triple Crown)
- Doxology (2001, Facedown)
- The Revelation (2003, Triple Crown)
- Benediction (2003, Angelskin Media)
