= Comrades (band) =

American rock band

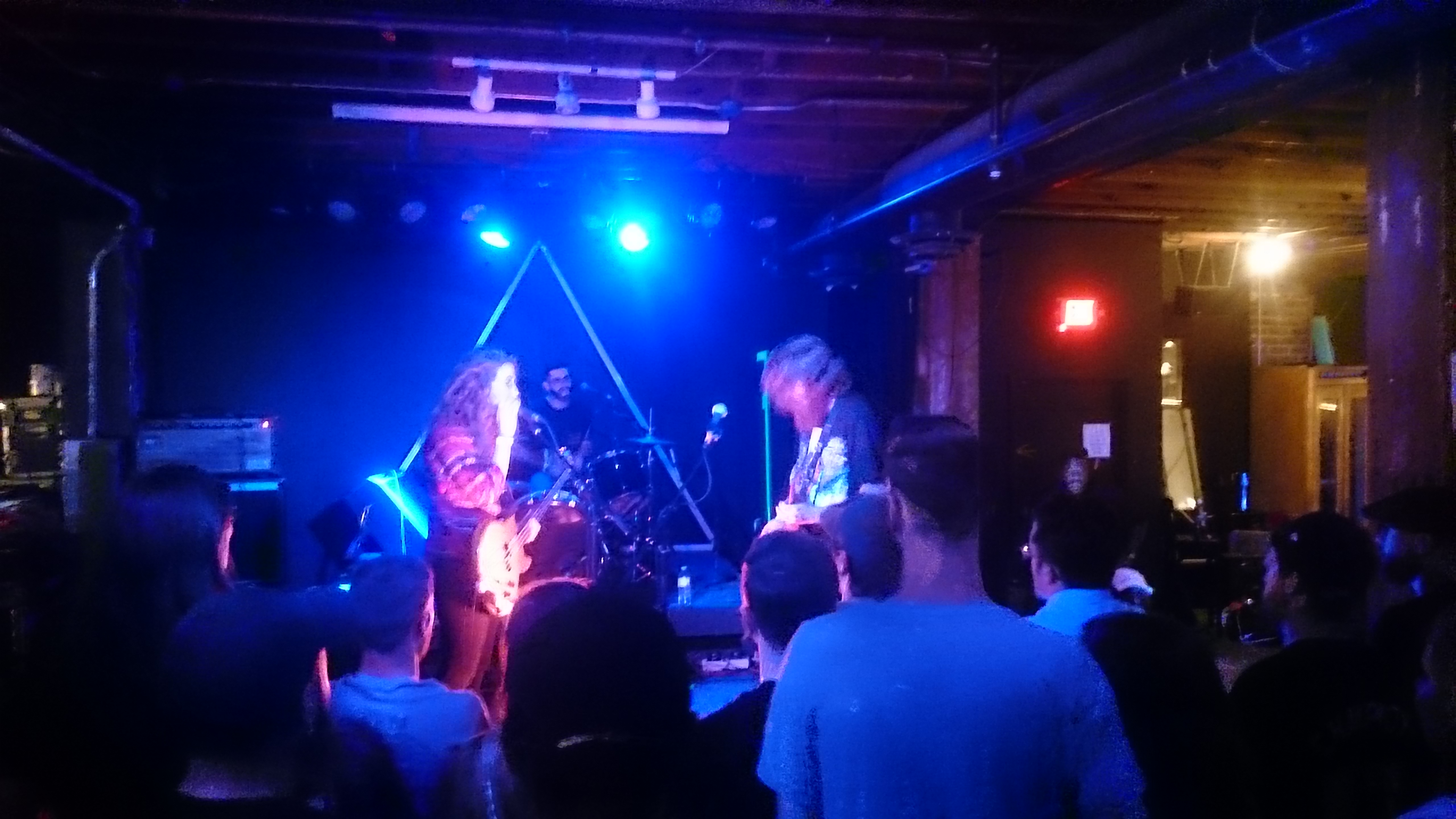
- Comrades performing in 2017

Background information
- Origin: Richmond, Virginia, U.S.
- Genres: Post-hardcore; Christian punk; post-rock
- Years active: 2008–2022
- Labels: Blood & Ink, Facedown
- Past members: Joe McElroy; Laura Reitzel; John Gaskil; Ben Trussell
- Website: wearecomrades.com

Comrades was an American rock band from Richmond, Virginia. The band started making music in 2008 and released a studio album, Safekeeper, in 2014 via Blood and Ink Records.

Their members are Joe McElroy (guitarist), and Laura Anne Reitzel (vocalist, bassist). Unclean vocalist and drummer Ben Trussell announced in June 2017 that he has decided to amicably part ways with the band and work on a solo musical project called BJORN. Former Life in Your Way and Conveyer drummer John Gaskill took over the mantle of drummer and Unclean vocalist. In 2023, the band announced their disbanding in a formal statement.

== Music history ==
The band commenced as a musical entity in February 2008, with their first release, Safekeeper, a studio album, that was released on May 6, 2014, from Blood and Ink Records.

The band played Facedown Fest 2016 for Facedown Records. Their second album, Lone/Gray, was released via Facedown Records on October 7, 2016. Comrades headlined night two of Threat Fest in 2017.

Vocalist Laura Reitzel shared on the band's social media in January 2023 that the band had broken up the previous year.

== Members ==
=== Current members ===
- Laura Anne Reitzel – clean vocals, bass guitar (2008–2022)
- Joe McElroy – lead guitar (2008–2022)
- John Gaskill – drums, unclean vocals (2018–2022)

=== Former members ===
- Ben Trussell – drums, unclean vocals (2008–2017)

== Discography ==
Studio albums

- Lift Up Your Head (February 8, 2010)
- The Refugee (June 1, 2011, Blood and Ink Records)
- Safekeeper (May 6, 2014, Blood and Ink Records)
- Lone/Grey (October 7, 2016, Facedown Records)
- For We Are Not Yet, We Are Only Becoming (June 7, 2019, Facedown Records)

Compilations

- Collection: 2010–2011 (2011, Blood and Ink Records)
