= Figure Four =

Canadian hardcore punk band

- Origin: Winnipeg, Manitoba, Canada
- Genres: Christian hardcore
- Years active: 1997–2006, 2011–2013
- Labels: Solid State Records; Facedown Records; Blood and Ink (affiliated)

The Figure Four is a Canadian hardcore punk band formed in December 1997, and having recorded three albums since. The band usually performs songs of the hardcore punk and metalcore genres. The band is currently on hiatus.

== History ==
Figure Four started in December 1997, and are currently signed to Solid State Records. The band is currently on hiatus, as two of its members are now in the full-time touring hardcore punk band, Comeback Kid, and one of its members is now in a band, Grave Maker. They played a few isolated shows throughout 2006.

FF bassist Jason Bailey played bass for Endless Fight in 2005, Shattered Realm in 2006, and the Cancer Bats in 2007. He also filled in for Too Pure to Die on the latest tours.

The Belgian webzine RMP printed the rumour on January 14, 2011, that they were going to perform. Figure Four performed at Rain Fest in Seattle, Washington on May 28, 2011.

Regarding the band's stance on the controversy surrounding whether or not Figure Four is still a Christian band, vocalist Andrew Neufeld had this to say at Rain Fest 2011: "It's been a while, but we haven't broke up, but the last time we played was 2006. I realized something this week; I've been involved in Figure Four for half of my life--literally...and we're definitely in different places than we were when we started this band, and we have different ideas and different beliefs, and we've moved on and we've grown older..."

Figure Four played at Furnace Fest on September 24, 2022, in Birmingham, Alabama.

== Members ==
Last known lineup

- Andrew Neufeld – vocals (currently: Comeback Kid, Sights & Sounds)
- Jeremy Hiebert – guitar (currently: Comeback Kid)
- 'Metal' Mel – guitar
- Jason Bailey – bass (currently: Grave Maker, ex-Cancer Bats)
- 'Optimus' Steve 'Prime' Dueck – drums (ex-The Undecided)

Former

- Mike Peters – drums
- Scott Heppner – guitar
- Jon Kitchen – bass

== Discography ==
Studio albums

- No Weapon Formed Against Us (1999, Facedown Records)
- When It's All Said and Done (2001, Facedown Records)
- Suffering the Loss (2003, Solid State Records)

Split EPs

- Point of Recognition/Figure Four (Facedown Records; split with Point of Recognition)
