= Truer Living with a Youthful Vengeance =

Studio album by Dynasty
- Released: May 24, 2011
- Genre: Christian hardcore, hardcore punk
- Length: 22:15
- Label: Strike First

Dynasty chronology
Truer Living with a Youthful Vengeance (2011)	Beyond Measure (2013)

Truer Living with a Youthful Vengeance is the first studio album from Dynasty. Strike First Records released the album on May 24, 2011.

== Critical reception ==
Professional ratings
Review scores
Source	Rating
Christ Core	3.5/5 stars
Cross Rhythms	7/10 squares
HM Magazine	4/5 stars
Indie Vision Music	3/5 stars
Jesus Freak Hideout	2/5 stars 2.5/5 stars
Mind Equals Blown	1.5/10

Awarding the album four stars from HM Magazine, Brittany McNeal states, "the album has thoughtful lyrics that provide an attention-grabbing full effect." Ian Webber, rating the album seven out of ten for Cross Rhythms, writes, "At times punk influences can be heard as the onslaught from these 10 tracks never lets up." Giving the album three and a half stars at Christ Core, Brian Morrissette says, "Truer Living with a Youthful Vengeance is a great album, but I sadly think this LP will be overlooked unjustly by many fans of the hardcore genre."

BMer, awarding the album three stars for Indie Vision Music, writes, "Truer Living With a Youthful Vengeance is an album that you will throw on, and throw down." Giving the album two and a half stars from Jesus Freak Hideout, Michael Weaver states, "Dynasty brings a pretty good sound back to what has felt like a lost genre." Wayne Reimer, rating the album two stars at Jesus Freak Hideout, says, "what we have here in Truer Living... is an honest mess, with real passion and no-holds-barred faith-filled lyrics, but unfortunately a sub-par performance." Signaling in a 1.5 out of ten review at Mind Equal Blown, Garry Lee describes, "Truer Living With a Youthful Vengeance is a masterclass in musical mediocrity."

== Track listing ==
No.	Title	Length
1.	"Worthless Will"	2:29
2.	"Voice of Truth"	2:23
3.	"Wisdom Is Supreme"	1:50
4.	"Triumph and Truth"	2:49
5.	"Alpha"	0:44
6.	"Back to Life"	2:09
7.	"Demolish Strongholds"	2:39
8.	"Way of the Wolf"	2:33
9.	"Dangerous Minds"	2:25
10.	"Sitting Back"	2:14
Total length:		22:15
