= Self Harvest =

Studio album by Ark of the Covenant
- Released: April 30, 2013
- Genres: Christian metal, metalcore
- Length: 30:03
- Label: Facedown
- Producer: Greg Thomas

Ark of the Covenant chronology
Separation (2011)	Self Harvest (2013)

Self Harvest is the first studio album from Ark of the Covenant. Facedown Records released the album on April 30, 2013. Ark of the Covenant worked with Greg Thomas, in the production of this album.

== Critical reception ==
Professional ratings
Review scores
Source	Rating
Cross Rhythms	6/10 squares
HM Magazine	4/5 stars
Indie Vision Music	4/5 stars
Mind Equals Blown	4.0/10

Awarding the album four stars from HM Magazine, Jef Cunningham states, "Big thumbs up on this one". Oscar Hyde, rating the album six out of ten for Cross Rhythms, writes, "It's just a shame that such powerful diatribes didn't have a more imaginative musical framework." Lee Brown, giving the album four stars at Indie Vision Music, says, "Self Harvest is musically layered and vocally powerful." Tyler Sharp, signaling in a four out of ten review by Mind Equals Blown, describes, "it’s somewhat dumbfounding to see something so generic to come out of their camp."

== Track listing ==
All tracks are written by Ark of the Covenant

No.	Title	Length
1.	"Abandoned"	3:39
2.	"Fire"	0:49
3.	"Parasite"	3:37
4.	"Transgressors"	2:40
5.	"Blind Man"	3:15
6.	"Sentient"	2:58
7.	"Fury"	0:57
8.	"Withered"	2:53
9.	"Fakes"	3:02
10.	"Self Harvest"	4:13
11.	"Famine"	2:00
Total length:		30:03
