= Something More (Altars album) =

Studio album by Altars
- Released: May 14, 2013
- Genre: Christian metal, metalcore, Melodic hardcore, Pop punk
- Length: 35:06
- Label: Facedown
- Producer: Altars, Seth Munson

Altars chronology
Conclusions (2012)	Something More (2013)	A Profound Respect for Life (2015)

Something More is the second studio album from Altars. Facedown Records released the album on May 14, 2013. Altars worked with Seth Munson in the production of this album.

== Critical reception ==
Professional ratings
Review scores
Source	Rating
Cross Rhythms	5/10 squares
HM Magazine	3/5 stars
Jesus Freak Hideout	3.5/5 stars

Awarding the album three stars from HM Magazine, Dan Garcia states, "Something More presents a smooth and even flow in its style that it’s hard to be labeled as just another cookie-cutter album." Graeme Crawford, rating the album five out of ten for Cross Rhythms, writes, "this album fails to deliver the 'Something More' that is needed to drag it out of mediocrity." Giving the album three and a half stars at Jesus Freak Hideout, Wayne Reimer says, "Altars definitely gave us Something More this time around."

== Track listing ==
No.	Title	Writer(s)	Length
1.	"Something More"	Canaan Smith	2:33
2.	"Question Everything"	Smith	1:55
3.	"Eternity"	Smith	5:14
4.	"Sent to Destroy"	Smith	3:30
5.	"Transparency"	Smith	2:54
6.	"Revolutions"	Mike Searle	3:54
7.	"Caverns"	Smith	3:49
8.	"Break Free"	Searle	3:43
9.	"Westboro"	Smith	3:30
10.	"To Give"	Smith	4:24
Total length:			35:06
