= Thieves & Liars =

American christian rock band (2006–2010)

- Origin: San Diego, California
- Genres: Christian rock, Christian metal, heavy metal
- Years active: 2006–2010
- Labels: Facedown, Dreamt
- Past members: Corey Edelmann; Joey Bradford; Kyle Rosa

Thieves & Liars (2006–2010) was an American Christian rock and Christian metal band from San Diego, California, where they formed in 2006, and disbanded in 2010. The members of the band were vocalist and bassist, Joey Bradford, drummer and vocalist, Kyle Rosa, and lead guitarist, Corey Edelmann. Their first album, When Dreams Become Reality, was released in 2008 by Facedown Records alongside Dreamt Records. The subsequent album, American Rock 'N' Roll, was released by the aforementioned record labels, in 2009.

== Music history ==
The band commenced as a musical entity in 2006, with their first release, When Dreams Become Reality, a studio album, that was released by Facedown Records in association with Dreamt Records, on January 22, 2008. Their subsequent and final album, American Rock 'N' Roll, was released on September 1, 2009.

== Members ==
Last Known Line-up

- Joey Bradford - vocals, bass
- Kyle Rosa - drums, vocals (Poison Headache)
- Corey Edelmann - guitar (ex-No Innocent Victim, ex-Project 86)

== Discography ==
Studio albums

- When Dreams Become Reality (January 22, 2008, Facedown/Dreamt)
- American Rock 'N' Roll (September 1, 2009, Facedown/Dreamt)
