= Alove for Enemies =

American Christian hardcore band

Alove For Enemies
- Genres: Christian hardcore Christian metal metalcore
- Years active: 2000–2007, 2012, 2014–present
- Label: Facedown
- Members: Erich Barto; Matt Addeo; Dan Valentino; Luke Anthony; Andy Amato
- Past members: Jon Hernandez; Bill Meis; AJ Gonzales; Mike Desairo; Dan Lomeli

Alove for Enemies is a Christian hardcore band from Long Island, New York, US. They claim Shai Hulud, Darkest Hour, and Few Left Standing as their influences.

== Biography ==
The band was founded in 1999, and released their first six-song EP independently in 2000. The group was founded by singer Erich Barto and drummer A.J. Gonzalez. The band was signed to independent label Polytope records and toured twice under this label. After A.J. Gonzalez left the band, they replaced Gonzalez with Mike Desario for most of 2003. In late 2003 Jon Hernandez joined just before the band signed to Californian label Strikefirst Records, a subsidiary of Facedown Records. They released the EP Broken Pledge in December 2003 and played many gigs to support it.

In March 2004 Alove for Enemies signed with the main Facedown Records label. A year later, the album The Harvest was released; it was supported by a full US tour and by a European tour in spring 2005.

2006 saw the release of The Resistance on Facedown Records. All the song titles on the album are references to the movie Equilibrium.

On September 4, 2007, Alove For Enemies announced their break up on their Myspace blog. They played Facedown Fest East Coast in Maryland as their penultimate show, on Sept. 29, 2007. Their final show was played on Long Island Oct. 5, 2007. Former guitar player Bill Meis joined them for "Center of Attention" and "Angels Don't Burn".

On May 14, 2012, Alove For Enemies announced a reunion show for August 17 at the annual Long Island Fest 3 day Hardcore Festival. No further shows have been announced.

== Members ==
Last Known Lineup

- Erich Barto - vocals (1999-2007, 2012, 2014–present) (now has solo project Emissary)
- Matt Addeo - guitar (1999-2007, 2012, 2014–present)
- Dan Valentino - guitar (2005-2007, 2012, 2014–present) (now in Shepherds)
- Luke Anthony - bass/vocals (1999-2007, 2012, 2014–present)
- Andy Amato - drums (2012, 2014–present) (was in Letter To The Exiles)

Past members

- Bill Meis - guitar (1999-2005, final shows 2007)
- Mike Desario - drums (2003)
- AJ Gonzales - drums (1999-2003)
- Jon Hernandez - drums (2003-2007)
- Dan Lomeli - drums (2007)

== Discography ==
Demos

- Tread On My Dreams
- Hour Of Decision
- The Silent Rival (2003)

Studio albums

- The Truth of Trumpets (Polytope Records) (2001)
- Broken Pledge (Strike First Records) (2003)
- The Harvest (Facedown Records) (2005)
- Resistance (Facedown Records) (2006)

== Music videos ==
- Tread On My Dreams (Resistance) -2006
- The Hour Of Decision (The Harvest) -2005
