= XLooking Forwardx =

American Christian hardcore band

xLooking Forwardx
- Also known as: Looking Forward, xLFx
- Origin: Bel Air, Maryland
- Genres: Hardcore punk Christian hardcore
- Years active: 1999–present
- Labels: Facedown, Blood and Ink, DFF
- Members: Justin Chaillou; Josh Chaillou; Kevin Doherty; Kevin O'Brien
- Website: xLooking Forwardx on Facebook

xLooking Forwardx is an American Christian hardcore band, and they primarily play hardcore punk, while they are members of the straight edge movement. They come from Bel Air, Maryland. The band started making music in 1999. Their lineup consists of brothers Justin (vocals) and Josh Chaillou (guitars), their cousin Kevin Doherty (bass), and Kevin O'Brien (drums). The band released a studio album, Ahoy Crew Members!, in 2002 with DFF Records. Their subsequent studio album, What This Means to Me, was released by Blood and Ink Records, in 2004. They signed to Facedown Records, where they released, The Path We Tread, a studio album, in 2005. Their next release, an extended play, Down with the Ship, was released by Facedown Records, in 2012.

== Background ==
xLooking Forwardx is a Christian hardcore band from Bel Air, Maryland, and are members of the straight edge movement. Their members are vocalist, Justin Chaillou, guitarist, Josh Chaillou, bassist, Kevin Doherty, and drummer, Kevin O'Brien.

== Music history ==
The band commenced as a musical entity in September 1999, with their first release, Ahoy Crew Members!, a studio album, that was released by DFF Records. Their subsequent studio album, What This Means to Me, was released on January 20, 2004, by Blood and Ink Records. They signed with Facedown Records, where they released, The Path We Tread, on November 8, 2005. The next release, an extended play, Down with the Ship, was released on June 19, 2012, by Facedown Records.

== Members ==
Current members

- Justin Chaillou - vocals
- Josh Chaillou - guitar
- Kevin Doherty - bass
- Kevin O'Brien - drums

== Discography ==
Studio albums

- Ahoy Crew Members! (2002, DFF)
- What This Means to Me (January 20, 2004, Blood and Ink)
- The Path We Tread (November 8, 2005, Facedown)

EPs

- Down with the Ship (June 19, 2012, Facedown)

Demos

- 1117 (2000)
