= Dynasty (hardcore band) =

American Christian hardcore punk band

- Origin: Los Angeles, California
- Genres: Christian hardcore, hardcore punk
- Years active: 2004–present
- Labels: Facedown, Strike First
- Members: Joel Muniz; Ivan Hernandez; Marcel Muniz; Ruben Nunez; Nick Sturz
- Website: facebook.com/DynastyHC

Dynasty is an American Christian hardcore punk band from Los Angeles, California. The band started making music in 2004, and their members are lead vocalist, Joel Muniz, guitarists, Ivan Hernandez and Marcel Muniz, bassist, Ruben Nunez, and drummer, Nick Sturz. The band released a studio album, Truer Living with a Youthful Vengeance, in 2011 with Strike First Records. Their second studio album, Beyond Measure, was released in 2013 by Facedown Records. The band is performing at Facedown Fest 2017.

== Background ==
Dynasty is a Christian hardcore band from Los Angeles, California. Their members are lead vocalist, Joel Muniz, guitarists, Ivan Hernandez and Marcel Muniz, bassist, Ruben Nunez, and drummer, Nick Sturz.

== Music history ==
The band commenced as a musical entity in 2004 with their first release, Truer Living with a Youthful Vengeance, a studio album, that was released by Strike First Records on May 24, 2011. Their second studio album, Beyond Measure, was released by Facedown Records on January 22, 2013.

== Members ==
Current members

- Joel Muniz - lead vocals
- Ivan Hernandez - guitar
- Marcel Muniz - guitar (Dangerous Minds)
- Ruben Nunez - bass
- Nick Sturz - drums

== Discography ==
Studio albums

- Truer Living with a Youthful Vengeance (May 24, 2011, Strike First)
- Beyond Measure (January 22, 2013, Facedown)
