= Kingston Falls =

American Christian hardcore band

- Origin: Goshen, Indiana
- Genres: Christian hardcore, hardcore punk, metalcore
- Years active: 2003–2009
- Labels: Facedown, Strike First
- Past members: Brent; Josiah; Ryan; Shea; Chris; Jason; Josh; John

Kingston Falls were an American Christian hardcore band, and they primarily played hardcore punk and metalcore. They were from Goshen, Indiana, where they formed in 2003 and disbanded in 2009. The primary members of the band were John Busenbark (vocals), Brent Zebell (Drums), Josiah Gaut (Guitar), Josh Battles (Guitar), and Jason Gough (Bass). They released three independently made extended plays; Seasons of Despair (2003), Kingston Falls (2004), and Crusader (2005). Their first studio album, The Crescendo of Sirens, was released by Strike First Records, in 2006. The subsequent and last studio album, Armada on Mercury, was released by Facedown Records, in 2008.

== Background ==
Kingston Falls was a Christian hardcore and Christian metal band that hailed from Goshen, Indiana. From conception through "The Crescendo of Sirens" album, the members were John Busenbark (vocals), Brent Zebell (drums), Josh Battles (guitar), Josiah Gaut (guitar), and Jason Gough (bass, Beyond the Fathoms). Following the release of "The Crescendo of Sirens" in 2006, the band experienced some turnover and volatility in its membership, cycling all contributors except Brent and Josiah by the time the band disbanded.

== Music history ==
The band commenced as a musical entity in 2003,. They released three albums independently before signing with Facedown imprint Strike First Records. These first three albums were "Seasons of Despair" (2003), Kingston Falls (2004) and, Crusader (2005). Their first studio album, The Crescendo of Sirens, was released by Strike First Records, on April 4, 2006. The subsequent studio album, Armada on Mercury, was released by Facedown Records, on March 18, 2008.

== Members ==
Last known lineup

- Brent Zebell – drums (2003–2009)
- Josiah Gaut – guitar (2003–2009)

Past members

- Jason Gough – bass (2003–2006)
- Josh Battles – guitar (2003–2008)
- Bill Bowers – bass (2006–2008)
- John Busenbark – vocals (2004–2006)
- Nate Lambright Dale – vocals (2006–2008)
- Justin Gibson – vocals (2003–2004)

Lineup for post-2011 reunion shows

- John Busenbark – vocals
- Brent Zebell – drums
- Josiah Gaut – guitar
- Bill Bowers – bass

== Discography ==
Studio albums

- The Crescendo of Sirens (April 4, 2006, Strike First)
- Armada on Mercury (March 18, 2008, Facedown)
