= Ace Augustine =

American metalcore band

- Origin: Lancaster, Pennsylvania
- Genres: Metalcore; Christian metal
- Years active: 2008–2014
- Labels: Strike First, Red Cord
- Past members: Ryan Feister; Tyler Chadwick; Spencer Barnett; Cody Owen; Josh Hess; Ben Moser; Kyle Irwin; Brandon Klinger; Brian Fellenbaum; Doug Fellenbaum
- Website: facebook.com/AceAugustine

Ace Augustine was an American metalcore band from Lancaster, Pennsylvania. The band started making music in 2008, and their membership throughout their tenure has been vocalists, Kyle Irwin, Ben Moser, and Ryan Feister, guitarists, Brian Fellenbaum, Tyler Chadwick, Alex Bolton, and Spencer Barnett, bassist, Cody Owen, drummers, Doug Fellenbaum and Josh Hess, and keyboardist, Brandon Klinger. The band released an independently made extended play, The Glory of Trumpets, in 2009. Their first studio album, The Absolute, was released by Strike First Records, in 2011. The subsequent studio album, The Sick and Suffering, was released by Red Cord Records, in 2013.

== History ==
The band's members have been throughout their tenure vocalists, Kyle Irwin, Ben Moser, and Ryan Feister, guitarists, Brian Fellenbaum, Tyler Chadwick, and Spencer Barnett, bassist, Cody Owen, drummers, Doug Fellenbaum and Josh Hess, and keyboardist, Brandon Klinger.

The band commenced as a musical entity in 2008, with their first release, The Glory of Trumpets, an extended play, that was released independently in 2009. Their first studio album, The Absolute, was released by Strike First Records on January 18, 2011. The subsequent studio album, The Sick and Suffering, was released by Red Cord Records on April 23, 2013.

== Members ==
Current members

- Ryan Feister - lead vocals
- Tyler Chadwick - guitar, vocals
- Spencer Barnett - guitar
- Cody Owen - bass
- Josh Hess - drums

Past members

- Ben Moser - vocals
- Kyle Irwin - vocals
- Alex Bolton - guitar
- Brian Fellenbaum - guitar
- Brandon Klinger - keys
- Doug Fellenbaum - drums

== Discography ==
Studio albums

- The Absolute (January 18, 2011, Strike First)
- The Sick and Suffering (April 23, 2013, Red Cord)

EPs

- The Glory of Trumpets (2009, Independent)
