= Beyond Measure (Dynasty album) =

Studio album by Dynasty
- Released: January 22, 2013
- Genre: Christian hardcore, hardcore punk
- Length: 24:56
- Label: Facedown
- Producer: Andrew P. Glover

Dynasty chronology
Truer Living with a Youthful Vengeance (2011)	Beyond Measure (2013)

Beyond Measure is the second studio album from Dynasty. Facedown Records released the album on January 22, 2013. Dynasty worked with Andrew P. Glover in the production of this album.

== Critical reception ==
Professional ratings
Review scores
Source	Rating
Cross Rhythms	7/10 squares
HM Magazine	3.5/5 stars
Indie Vision Music	3/5 stars
Jesus Freak Hideout	3.5/5 stars

Awarding the album three and a half stars, Tony D. Bryant from HM Magazine stated, "Beyond Measure is full of adrenaline-pumping lyrics and circle pits... with guitars, drums and vocals all blending to a hard, fast and full-of-emotion album. There is no sitting still while listening to this album." Mark Sherwood, rating the album a seven out of ten for Cross Rhythms, wrote, "A tad repetitive and unadventurous but Beyond Measure definitely has its moments." Giving the album three and a half stars at Jesus Freak Hideout, Scott Fryberger wrote, "it's an enjoyable album." Lee Brown, awarding the album three stars by Indie Vision Music, said, "the album is filled with brutality that is skillfully executed and bleeds deeply... Putting its brevity aside, Beyond Measure has some solid musicianship and some fantastic guest appearances."

== Track listing ==
No.	Title	Length
1.	"Word is Born"	1:44
2.	"Brick by Brick"	0:54
3.	"Rise to Victory" (featuring Jesse Barnett and Tommy Green)	2:12
4.	"Omni-Death"	2:04
5.	"Hard Pressed" (featuring Roger Miret)	2:04
6.	"Beyond Measure"	3:26
7.	"Savage Mind" (featuring Martin Stewart)	2:33
8.	"Undefeated"	2:38
9.	"Death Solution"	1:39
10.	"Burn in Me"	1:37
11.	"Explicit Method"	2:08
12.	"Get Live" (featuring Inspectah Deck)	1:57
Total length:		24:56
