= All Out War (band) =

American metalcore band

- Origin: Newburgh, New York, U.S.
- Genres: Metalcore, hardcore punk, thrash metal
- Years active: 1991–2004, 2006–present
- Labels: Gain Ground, Victory, Organized Crime, Unbeaten Records, Translation Lost
- Members: Mike Score; Taras Apuzzo; Andrew Pietroluongo; Eric Carrillo; Mike Pistone
- Past members: See below

All Out War is an American metalcore/hardcore band from Newburgh, New York, formed in 1991. They have released eight full-length albums starting in 1997.

== Career ==
The band played their first show together in Newburgh, New York at the Hudson Valley skate park in 1991. A riot broke out resulting in the police intervening. The lineup was Darryl Quirk, Sam Carbone, Tom Connelly (three members from A.W.O.L., an earlier hardcore band from Newburgh, N.Y.) and Mike Score. They are sometimes credited with having formed in 1993. The band's lineup shifted frequently in its early years before their first full-length release Truth in the Age of Lies on the German record label Gain Ground in 1997. Later in 1997, the band signed with the Chicago-based record label Victory Records, where they released their second album For Those Who Were Crucified in 1998.

Turmoil within the band continued in the years following the release of For Those Who Were Crucified with multiple band members entering and leaving the band. The band returned to the studio in 2003 to record their third full length, Condemned to Suffer, which was also released on Victory Records. In 2004, the band announced that they had officially broken up due to the inability of vocalist Mike Score to continue with the band.

All Out War reunited in 2006, and released their fourth album Assassins in the House of God (2007). By early 2008, the band had left Victory Records. However, by early 2010, All Out War had returned to the record label and recorded Into the Killing Fields, which was released in August 2010.

In late June 2015, All Out War released a new EP, Dying Gods, on Organized Crime Records. Given the established relationship with the Organized Crime Records label, All Out War released their next album, Give Us Extinction (2017) with them. The album was a return to the approach and sound of their Condemned to Suffer album. The band then connected with Unbeaten Records. They released their next album, Crawl Among the Filth (2019), through the label. In early February 2023, they released a more black metal-influenced album, Celestial Rot, on Translation Loss Records.

== Members ==
=== Current ===
- Mike Score – vocals
- Taras Apuzzo – guitars
- Andrew Pietroluongo – guitars
- Eric Carrillo – bass
- Mike Pistone – drums

=== Former ===
Guitar

- Brad Mader
- Chris Bozeth
- Chris Chisholm
- James Bremer
- Jim Antonelli
- Jose Segarra
- Justin Rowand

Drums

- Jesse Sutherland
- Derek Taylor
- Joe Branciforte
- Lou Iuzzini
- Lou Medina
- Matt Byrne
- Tom Connelly

Bass

- Jon "Skippy"
- Sam Carbone

== Discography ==
=== Studio albums ===
- Truth in the Age of Lies [Gain Ground] (1997)
- For Those Who Were Crucified [Victory Records] (1998)
- Condemned to Suffer [Victory Records] (2003)
- Assassins in the House of God [Victory Records] (2007)
- Into the Killing Fields [Victory Records] (2010)
- Give Us Extinction [Organized Crime Records] (2017)
- Crawl Among the Filth [Unbeaten Records] (2019)
- Celestial Rot [Translation Loss Records] (2023)

=== Other ===
- Destined to Burn 7" [Hardway Records] (1994)
- Hymns of the Apocalypse 7" [Trip Machine Laboratories] (2008)
- 1992 Demo (aka Sum of All Fears) 10" [Organized Crime Records] (2012)
- Dying Gods (EP) [Organized Crime Records] (2015)
