= Means (band) =

Canadian post-hardcore/melodic hardcore band

- Also known as: Means 2 An End
- Origin: Regina, Saskatchewan, Canada
- Genres: Post-hardcore; Christian hardcore; metalcore; melodic hardcore; pop punk (early); emotional hardcore (early)
- Years active: 2000–2008
- Labels: Lonely Tree; Torque; Underground Operations; Facedown
- Past members: Aaron Friesen; Dylan Johnstone; Matt Goud; Todd Wells; Blair Roberts
- Website: Means' MySpace

Means was a Canadian post-hardcore and melodic hardcore band from Regina, Saskatchewan.

== History ==
The band was formed in 2001 under the name of Means 2 An End as a three-piece by main-songwriter and lyricist Matt Goud. They were originally from the small city of Dauphin, Manitoba. In 2003, they relocated to Regina, Saskatchewan. They eventually integrated elements of hardcore into their sound and dropped "2 An End" from their name. It was around this time, in 2005, that original bassist Blair Roberts quit to pursue a family. He was replaced by Dylan Johnstone, formerly of the Yorkton, Saskatchewan hardcore group Statement of Service. They remained a three-piece until mid-2006 when Wells joined so Johnstone could switch to lead vocals.

This era of the band saw them switch to a mainly metalcore sound inspired by Shai Hulud and Misery Signals. The group toured in the US and Canada, and was featured in the June 2007 issue of Alternative Press magazine as well as multiple other publications. Their 2007 album, Sending You Strength, was released in the US on Facedown Records.

Means disbanded after a series of farewell shows in select Canadian and US cities. They played their final show to a sold-out crowd at the Riddell Centre in the University of Regina on November 28, 2008. This show was captured on video and given out to friends of the band.

== Members ==
- Aaron Friesen – drums (2001–2008)
- Dylan Johnstone – vocals, bass (2005–2006) lead vocals (2006–2008)
- Matt Goud – guitar, clean vocals, (2001–2008) lead vocals (2001-2006)
- Todd Wells – bass guitar (2006–2008)
- Blair Roberts – bass guitar, vocals (2001–2005)

== Discography ==
As Means 2 An End

- Soul Soup for the Teenage Chicken LP (Self Released, 2001)
- Demo 2002 (self Released, 2002)
- There's Always Right Now on Negatives to Positives compilation (Abednego Records, 2003), produced by Keith Kilps and Cordel Wolski.
- Am I Who My Dog Thinks I am EP (Self Released, 2003)

As Means

- In Red Grace (Lonely Tree Records, 2004)
- More Than Watchmen For The Morning EP (Torque Records, 2005)
- Means & Blind Witness - Split EP (Torque Records, 2007)
- Sending You Strength (Facedown Records, 2007)
- To Keep Me From Sinking (Facedown Records, 2008)

== Awards ==
=== GMA Canada Covenant Awards ===
- 2006 Hard Music Album of the Year: More Than Watchmen For The Morning
- 2006 Hard Music Song of the Year: "You Will Become"
