= Flee the Seen =

2000s punk band from Kansas City, Missouri

- Also known as: Fighting Chance
- Origin: Kansas City, Missouri, U.S.
- Genres: Post-hardcore, screamo
- Years active: 2003–2009
- Label: Facedown
- Past members: Kim Anderson; R. L. Brooks; Manuel Sanchez; Aaron Crawford; Lucas Dills

Flee the Seen was a post-hardcore band from Kansas City, Missouri composed of Kim Anderson (vocals), R. L. Brooks (vocals/guitar), Manuel Sanchez(guitar), Aaron Crawford (drums), and Lucas Dills (bass). They were signed to Facedown Records in December, 2005 and released their first full-length record, Doubt Becomes The New Addiction, on March 14, 2006. Kim Anderson played bass from 2003–07, including on their debut album. Dills was recruited in 2007.

== Biography ==
Kim Anderson, Finbar Usher and R.L. Brooks met in 2000 while attending Missouri Western State University in St. Joseph, Missouri. They formed a band, Stellar, in 2001 with Anderson on bass and vocals, Brooks on guitar, and Tom Flaska as drummer. The group played a handful of local shows before disbanding when Anderson left for St. Louis to finish school. When Anderson returned to Kansas City in 2003, she and Brooks formed a new band, Fighting Chance, with drummer Jared Hoffman, releasing one self-titled EP in 2003 under that name. Fighting Chance continued playing several local shows throughout the year as a three-piece band, first with Hoffman on drums, then with a handful of rotating fill-in drummers, until a permanent replacement could be found. Toward the end of 2003, the band considered recruiting a second guitarist. Having met Manuel Sanchez as a mutual acquaintance at a few prior shows, Brooks contacted him in November of that year about possibly playing with the band. Sanchez ended up inviting Brooks to his birthday party, where the two became better acquainted and arranged to practice together. Sanchez was soon officially added as second guitarist. In early 2004, while playing a show with a temporary drummer at Groundwork Coffee House in Leavenworth, Kansas, sound technician Aaron Crawford arrived to fix a problem with the building's PA System. After watching the band perform he requested to audition for the position as the band's permanent drummer. Crawford became the band's official drummer shortly afterward.

Throughout most of the year, the band performed scores of shows in the Kansas City area. On August 17, 2004, the band announced its name change to Flee the Seen. They released their second EP The Sound of Sirens (their first under the new name) in September 2004. The band continued playing several shows throughout 2004 and 2005 and gained significant airplay on local stations. 96.5 The Buzz helped arrange for the band to open for such acts as Weezer in July 2005 and Coheed and Cambria in December 2005.

Flee the Seen signed with Facedown Records on December 4, 2005 and made a formal announcement of the signing later that week. Despite the label's Christian hardcore roots, Facedown was actually looking to expand their catalog of genres and sign a more melodic act. The band's debut full-length album Doubt Becomes the New Addiction was released on March 14, 2006, having been recorded, mixed and mastered almost a year earlier. Shortly thereafter, the band was named to Alternative Press Magazine's "100 Bands To Know" in 2006. The album has sold 10,000+ copies to date. The band has toured in support of Haste The Day, Heavy Heavy Low Low and Calico System. On February 9, 2007 the band announced that Anderson would begin performing solely as a vocalist, and would no longer play bass. The band hired a fifth member, Lucas Dills, to take over bass duties. They had initially planned to spend the next months finishing songs for their second album which had been scheduled to begin recording in 2007.

Unfortunately, disagreements with Facedown and the band's management over recording time and studios impeded on the completion of the album whose recording and release was consistently pushed back throughout 2007 and into 2008. Relations finally reached a head when the band requested to be dropped from the label, with which the label complied and the two amicably parted ways in August 2007. The band self-released four demos in November 2007. By 2008, the band recorded three more songs at Covenant Studios in Parkville, Missouri, but in the meantime Crawford had left the band to take a job with the U.S. Government, requiring him to travel often. Brooks and Anderson were becoming more preoccupied with their jobs running a T-shirt/merch business, and event coordinator at Kansas City's Uptown Theater, respectively; and Sanchez re-enrolled in college to finish his degree and enter a nursing program.

The band played a handful of shows throughout the spring and summer with fill-in drummers, and occasionally a fill-in guitarist when Sanchez had prior engagements with school. Occasionally Crawford would play at some of these shows when time allowed, and during a short tour in the fall, Dills played drums, and Anderson once again took on singing and bass guitar. However, by October 2008, the band came to an agreement to split when it was evident that they could no longer devote all of their time and energy to making music. A final show was announced in January 2009 followed by the official release of the three "Covenant Studios" recordings from the prior year, exclusively onto iTunes. The band performed together for the last time at the Uptown Theater on April 3, 2009. The show featured all five official members (Anderson, Brooks, Sanchez, Crawford & Dills) who performed the entire Doubt Becomes The New Addiction album in its entirety, front-to-back, plus five songs that were featured from their final EP and Covenant recordings.

== Band members ==
- Kim Anderson (vocals) (bass:2003-2007)
- R. L. Brooks (vocals/guitars)
- Manuel Sanchez (guitars)
- Aaron Crawford (drums)
- Lucas Dills (bass)

== Discography ==
- Fighting Chance EP (2003)
- The Sound of Sirens EP (2004)
- Doubt Becomes the New Addiction (2006)
- November 2007 Demos EP (2008)
- Covenant Studios Sessions EP (2009)

== Awards ==
- "Best Vocalist: Kim Anderson" 2005 Heavy Frequency Awards
- "Best Hardcore/Punk/Crossover Band: Flee the Seen" 2005 Heavy Frequency Awards
- "Achiever of the Year: Flee the Seen" 2005 Heavy Frequency Awards
