= Bloodlined Calligraphy =

American metal/hardcore band

- Origin: Ypsilanti, Michigan
- Genres: Metalcore
- Years active: 1996–2010, 2014-present
- Labels: Facedown, Strike First, Selah
- Website: Bloodlined Calligraphy on Facebook

Bloodlined Calligraphy is an American metalcore band. Hailing from Ypsilanti, Michigan, the band started making music in 1996 under the name Friction. In 1999, the band changed its name to Bloodlined Calligraphy and the band's lineup consisted of Matt Carter (drums), Matt Fleming (aka Birdman/Pat - vocals), Ryan Hampton (guitar), Eric Cargile (bass guitar), and Josh Colvin (guitar). The band signed to Selah Records and, in 2002, they released their first full-length album, Say Hi to the Bad Guy. In 2003, Fleming left the band amicably. The band conducted a nationwide search for their next vocalist, with Fleming having a large say in who should replace him as the band's vocalist. The band asked Michigan native Ally French, who was at the time was fronting a touring metalcore band in Ohio named Forever Tearless, to audition. Ally had sung clean vocals alongside Fleming for several of Bloodlined Calligraphy's live shows and was Fleming's favored replacement. The band appointed Ally as their vocalist and played their first live shows together in late 2003. During the band's second show with Ally at the front, the group caught the eyes and ears of Jason Dunn, owner of Los Angeles-based record labels Facedown Records and Strike First Records. The group became part of Strike First Records and released an EP in 2004 titled The Beginning of the End, which was recorded by Mike Hasty, guitarist of another female-fronted, Michigan-based hardcore band, Walls of Jericho. Shortly after the album's release, guitarist Josh Colvin was replaced by Shawn Williams.

After months of touring to promote the EP, Jason Dunn signed the band to its primary label, Facedown Records. On April 26, 2005, the group released their second full-length album called, They Want You Silent, which helped catapult the group into the top tier of female-fronted rock bands and led to several successful tours with notable acts such as Kittie, The Acacia Strain, Caliban, and more. In 2006, the group went back into the studio to record their fourth studio album, Ypsilanti, which was released by Facedown Records on September 19, 2006. Shortly after the album's release, the group's drummer/founding member Matt Carter stepped down after the loss of his father and was replaced by fill-in drummers Robbie Coran and Chris Norman. At the same time, Ally left the band to focus on her family. She was temporarily replaced by Ellen Hoffman; in 2008, Nina Cislaghi (ex-Mary Shaw) joined as vocalist and Josh Badura joined as the new full-time drummer.

Tragically, the band lost founding member and bass player, Eric Cargile, who unexpectedly died on April 20, 2010. His passing came less than two months after he and Fleming survived a house fire. The band officially disbanded in 2010 until the band played a show on April 19, 2014. In 2017, the band once again reunited to play at Facedown Fest 2017. After Cargile's passing, "Birdman" officially rejoined the band as bassist.

The band has been active on and off since 2014. In 2024, they toured as a supporting act for metalcore band It Dies Today. In 2025, the band was selected as a headlining act for the Audiofeed Festival in Urbana, Illinois.

== Background ==
Bloodlined Calligraphy is a metalcore band from Ypsilanti, Michigan. The band consists of Ally French (vocals), Ryan Hampton (guitars/backing vocals), Shawn Williams (guitars), Matt Fleming aka "Birdman" or "Pat" (bass guitar, formerly vocals), and Josh Badura (drums). Bassist and founding member Eric Cargile died unexpectedly on April 20, 2010.

== Music history ==
The band commenced as a musical entity in 1996 and released their first album, Say Hi to the Bad Guy, in 2002. They released an EP titled The Beginning of the End, on Strike First Records in 2004. The group signed to Facedown Records in late 2004 and released They Want You Silent, a full-length album on April 26, 2005. Their subsequent studio album, Ypsilanti, was released on September 19, 2006 by the group's label, Facedown Records. The band is active in 2023, with rumors of new music coming in 2024-2025.

== Members ==
Current:

- Ally French - vocals, piano (2003–2006, 2014–present)
- Ryan Hampton - guitars, backing vocals (2000–2014, 2017–present), drums (2007)
- Shawn Williams - guitars (2004–present)
- Matt "Birdman/Pat" Fleming - vocals (1999–2003), bass (2012–2014, 2017–present)
- Josh Badura - drums (2008–present)

Former members:

- Eric Cargile - bass, guitars (1996–2010, died April 20, 2010)
- Joshua Colvin - guitars (1999–2004)
- Jason "Jay" Bowden - guitars (2004)
- Robbie Coran - drums (2006–2007)
- Ellen Hoffman - vocals (2006–2007)
- Chris Norman - drums (2007)
- Matt Carter - drums, backing vocals (1996–2006, 2014)
- Nina Cislaghi - vocals (2008-2010, 2014)

== Discography ==
Studio albums

- They Want You Silent (April 26, 2005, Facedown)
- Ypsilanti (September 19, 2006, Facedown)

Independent albums

- Say Hi to the Bad Guy (2002, Selah)

EPs

- The Beginning of the End (2004, Strike First)
