= Remove the Veil =

American Christian metal band

- Origin: Birmingham, Alabama, United States
- Genres: Sludge metal Christian metal metalcore
- Years active: 2005–2008
- Label: Facedown Records
- Past members: Mark Hendrix; Travis Hopkins; Pat Hood; Michael Sasser; Mark Coxwell; Cliff McCall
- Website: Remove the Veil on Myspace

Remove the Veil was a Christian metal band from Opelika, Alabama, founded in January 2005. They were most recently signed to Facedown Records. The band gets their name from 2 Corinthians 3:14.

== History ==
The band was initially a five-piece indie rock band consisting of Hendrix, McCall, Hood, Coxwell, and then-vocalist Michael Sasser, who released an EP in 2005 with 5 songs. In mid-2005 Sasser left to join With Blood Comes Cleansing, and the band decided to put Hendrix on vocals and guitar rather than find a replacement.

The band was signed to Facedown Records in March 2007, and their debut album, Another Way Home, was released in October 2007.

In September 2007, original drummer Mark Coxwell and original bassist Cliff McCall left the band. Shortly thereafter, Travis Hopkins began playing bass, and the band used a fill-in drummer for their November and December tours. In January 2008, Travis Hopkins switched instruments with Pat Hood.

On 23 May 2008, the band announced on their Myspace that they were splitting up. Their last show was 7 June 2008 at the Summer Side Show 6 in Columbus, Georgia.

== Members ==
Final lineup

- Mark Hendrix - vocals, guitar (2005–2008)
- Pat Hood - guitar (2005–2007), bass (2007–2008)
- Travis Hopkins - guitar (2007–2008), bass (2008)
- Drew Lyons - drums (2008)

Former members

- Michael Sasser - vocals (2005)
- Mark Coxwell - drums (2005–2007)
- Cliff McCall - bass (2005–2007)
- Toby Rose - drums (2007–2008)

Timeline

== Discography ==
EPs

- Remove the Veil (Independent, 2006)

Studio albums

- Another Way Home (Facedown, 2007)

== Trivia ==
Watauga, the name of the sixth track on Another Way Home was chosen by vocalist/lyricist Mark Hendrix for its "dark, foreboding sound, that belonged to a prison's name, along with the familiarity that it brings of Native American words so ingrained in the South." Watauga is also the Cherokee Indian word for "the land beyond."
