= Altars (American metal band) =

American Christian metalcore band

- Origin: Colorado Springs, Colorado
- Genres: Christian metal, metalcore
- Years active: 2010–present
- Labels: Facedown, Strike First
- Members: Canaan Smith; Seth Munson; Mike Searle; Brock Williams; Ben Reno
- Website: facebook.com/AltarsHC

Altars are an American Christian metalcore band from Colorado Springs, Colorado. The band started making music in 2010, with members, lead vocalist, Canaan Smith, guitarists, Seth Munson and Brock Williams, bass guitarist Mike Searle, and drummer, Ben Reno. The band released one extended play, Opposition, in 2011 with Strike First Records. Their first studio album, Conclusions, was released by Facedown Records in 2012. The subsequent album, Something More, was released in 2013 by Facedown Records.

== Background ==
Altars is a Christian metal band from Colorado Springs, Colorado. Their members at its inception, in 2010, were lead vocalist, Canaan Smith, guitarists, Seth Munson and Brock Williams, bass guitarist, Mike Searle, and drummer, Ben Reno.

== Music history ==
The band formed in 2010 and their first album was Opposition, an extended play that was released on July 19, 2011 by Strike First Records. They released a studio album, Conclusions, on June 5, 2012, with Facedown Records. Their subsequent studio album, Something More, released on May 14, 2013 by Facedown Records. Upon leaving Facedown Records, they released their second EP titled A Profound Respect for Life on January 6, 2015.

== Members ==
Current

- Canaan Smith - vocals
- Seth Munson - guitar
- Mike Searle - bass
- Brock Williams - guitar
- Ben Reno - drums

== Discography ==
Studio albums

- Conclusions (June 5, 2012, Facedown)
- Something More (May 14, 2013, Facedown)

EPs

- Opposition (July 19, 2011, Strike First)
- A Profound Respect for Life (January 6, 2015, self released)
