= XDeathstarx =

American Christian metal band

xDEATHSTARx
- Origin: Redlands, California, U.S.
- Genres: Christian hardcore, metalcore
- Years active: 2002–2009, 2015–2016
- Labels: Facedown, Life Sentence, I Witness
- Spinoffs: Sleeping Giant
- Members: Eric Gregson; Ryan Gregson; Tommy Green; J.R. Bermuda (Little Ryan); Josh Highland; Brandon Trahan (B-Town); Matt Boughton; Jason Keller
- Past members: Chris Fik; Ryan "The Dog" Nelson; Issac Bueno; Manny Contreras; Ryan Moger; Daniel Myerscough; Kevin Davis (Kevy-D); BeeJay Hamell; Corey Johnson; Travis Boyd (Tiny Travis); Nick Smith; Mike Dunlap; Geoff Brouillette

xDEATHSTARx /ˈdɛθstɑːr/ was an American Christian metalcore band from Redlands, California. All of the members are straight edge and they incorporate both Christian and straight edge themes within their music, with their view of the loss of values in modern society.

== History ==
The group released its first album in 2004 and is currently signed to Facedown Records. xDEATHSTARx has recorded two full-length albums and two independent EPs on independent record labels, including Facedown Records, Life Sentence Records, and I Witness Media. The band features three full-time vocalists as well as two guitarists and a bassist. They have appeared on the Discovery Channel's Jesse James' Monster Garage. In 2008, they released a remastered version of their debut album, which had been out of print. In March 2009 the band announced they were breaking up and moving on their separate ways.

It is rumored that the band members are vegans as its bio mentions a "ThanksVegan" feast in Redlands, CA.; In March 2009, the band announced that their final show would take place on April 4 at Facedown Fest 2009 in California.

All of the members of Sleeping Giant, minus Matt Weir of Remembrance, were former members of xDEATHSTARx. The band played one reunion show in 2015.

The band's line-up as of May 2015 contains members of Sleeping Giant, Impending Doom and Winds of Plague.

== Discography ==
Studio albums

- The Triumph (2004, Life Sentence Records)
- We Are the Threat (2007, Facedown Records)
- The Triumph (2008, Facedown Records (re-release, remastered, new artwork))

EPs

- Beware of the... (2003, demo EP)
- xDEATHSTARx vs. Suffocate Faster split EP with Suffocate Faster (2005, I Witness Records)

Compilation appearances

- Rise Up: Hardcore '03
- Punk Rock is Your Friend: Kung Fu Records Sampler No. 6

Other Songs

- "Generation" (2015; Single)
