= Ark of the Covenant (band) =

American Christian metalcore band

- Also known as: AOTC
- Origin: Connecticut
- Genres: Christian metal, metalcore
- Years active: 2009–present
- Labels: Facedown, Strike First
- Members: Alexander Vincelette; Jacob Johnson; Daniel Graves; Michael Hnath
- Website: facebook.com/arkofthecovenant

Ark of the Covenant is an American Christian metalcore band from Connecticut. The band started making music in 2009, and their members are lead vocalist Alexander Vincelette; lead guitarist Jacob Johnson; bass guitarist Daniel Graves; and drummer Michael Hnath.

The band released an extended play, Separation, in 2011 with Strike First Records. Their first studio album, Self Harvest, was released by Facedown Records, in 2013.

== Background ==
Ark of the Covenant is a Christian metal band from Connecticut. Their members are lead vocalist, Alexander Vincelette, guitarists, Jacob Johnson, Greg Thomas and Brad Thibodeaux, bassist, Daniel Graves, and drummer, Michael Hnath.

== Music history ==
The band commenced as a musical entity in 2009, with their first release, Separation, an extended play, that was released by Strike First Records on May 10, 2011. Their first studio album, Self Harvest, was released on April 30, 2013 by Facedown Records.

== Members ==
Current members

- Alexander Vincelette - lead vocals (2009–present)
- Tom - guitar
- Daniel Graves - bass (2009–present)
- Michael Hnath - drums (2009–present)

Former members

- Jacob Johnson - guitar (2009-2011)
- Philip Duchesne - bass, vocals (2009)
- Greg Thomas - guitar, keyboard
- Brad Thibodeaux - guitar

== Discography ==
Studio albums

- Self Harvest (April 30, 2013, Facedown)

EPs

- Separation (May 10, 2011, Strike First)
