= Letter to the Exiles =

American Christian metalcore band

- Origin: Long Island, New York, U.S.
- Genres: Metalcore; Christian hardcore
- Years active: 2008–2013
- Labels: Harvest Earth; Strike First; Facedown
- Past members: Chris King; Mark Randazzo; James Appleton; Andy Amato; Erich Barto; Ricky Taormina; Nathan Rojas; Buddy Clay
- Website: www.lettertotheexiles.com (archived)

Letter To The Exiles was an American Christian metalcore band from Long Island, New York. The band was active from 2008 through 2013 and was signed to Facedown Records in 2012.

== History ==
Letter To The Exiles was founded in 2008 and released their first EP, A Call to Arms, on August 12, 2008 on Canada-based label Harvest Earth Records (Winter Solstice, Saving Grace, Grey Lines of Perfection)

The band signed a record contract with Strike First Records in late October 2009 and released their debut full-length The Shadow Line on April 13, 2010. The Shadow Line was produced and engineered by Robert "Void" Caprio (Megadeth, The Fray, Eve 6), and the band toured nationally in support of the album. LTTE is endorsed by Truth Custom Drums, Fernandes Guitars, and has been reviewed in print publications such as AMP and HM Magazine.

=== At Facedown Records ===
Letter to the Exiles signed to Facedown Records in May 2012.

Guitarist Mark Randazzo was a vocalist for Facedown Records labelmate War of Ages's 2012 album Return to Life.

Letter To The Exiles' full-length album Make Amends, recorded with producer/engineer Joshua Barber (Norma Jean, Your Memorial, Solace) at Covenant Studio in Kansas City, MO, was released in stores and online August 14, 2012 on Facedown Records.

On May 14, 2013 they released a digital EP called Still Moving, Still Breathing that included a new song, an acoustic song from a track on Make Amends and a cover of Foo Fighters "Best of You"

On August 3, 2013 after their final tour, the "Still Moving, Still Breathing Tour", the band played its last show at Alliance Fest and then split up.

== Band members ==
- Chris King – vocals
- Mark Randazzo – guitar
- James Appleton – bass guitar
- Andy Amato – drums
- Erich Barto – vocals
- Ricky Taormina – guitar
- Nathan Rojas – guitar
- Buddy Clay – vocals
- Andrew LoPresto – vocals

== Discography ==
- A Call To Arms (Harvest Earth Records, 2008) – EP
- The Shadow Line (Strike First Records/Facedown Records, 2010)
- Make Amends (Facedown Records, 2012)
- Still Moving, Still Breathing (Facedown Records, 2013) – EP
