= Take It Back! =

American rock band

- Also known as: TIB!
- Origin: Fayetteville, Arkansas
- Genres: Hardcore punk, melodic hardcore, screamo, punk rock
- Years active: 2005–2012, 2015-present
- Labels: Facedown, Wrong Ones
- Past members: Zack Mckim; Nick Thomas; Daniel Hawkins; Cody Bradley; Josh Huskey

Take It Back! was an American hardcore band from Fayetteville, Arkansas. The band started making music in 2005, and disbanded in 2009. Their membership was vocalist, Nick Thomas, guitarists, Daniel Hawkins and Cody Bradley, and drummer, Josh Huskey. The band released an extended play, Rumors of Revolt, in 2009, with Facedown Records. Their first studio album, Can't Fight Robots, was released by Facedown Records, in 2008. The subsequent studio album, Atrocities, was released by Facedown Records, in 2009, as their final recording.

== Background ==
Take It Back! comes from Fayetteville, Arkansas. Their members were vocalist, Nick Thomas, guitarists, Daniel Hawkins and Cody Bradley, and drummer, Josh Huskey.

== Music history ==
The band commenced as a musical entity in 2005, with their first release, Can't Fight Robots, a studio album, that was released by Facedown Records on June 24, 2008. They released an extended play, Rumors of Revolt, on August 18, 2009 with Facedown Records. Their second studio album, Atrocities, was released by Facedown Records on November 10, 2009.

== Members ==
Last Known Line-up

- Daniel Hawkins - guitar
- Cody Bradley - guitar
- Josh Huskey - drums
- Zack McKim - vocals
- Devin Henderson - bass

Former Members

- Nick Thomas - vocals
- Keevan Merrill - vocals
- Anthony Morton - guitar
- Phillip Farris - vocals

== Discography ==
Studio albums

- Can't Fight Robots (June 24, 2008, Facedown)
- Atrocities (November 10, 2009, Facedown)

EPs

- Rumors of Revolt (August 18, 2009, Facedown)
