= Wrench in the Works =

American Christian mathcore/metalcore band

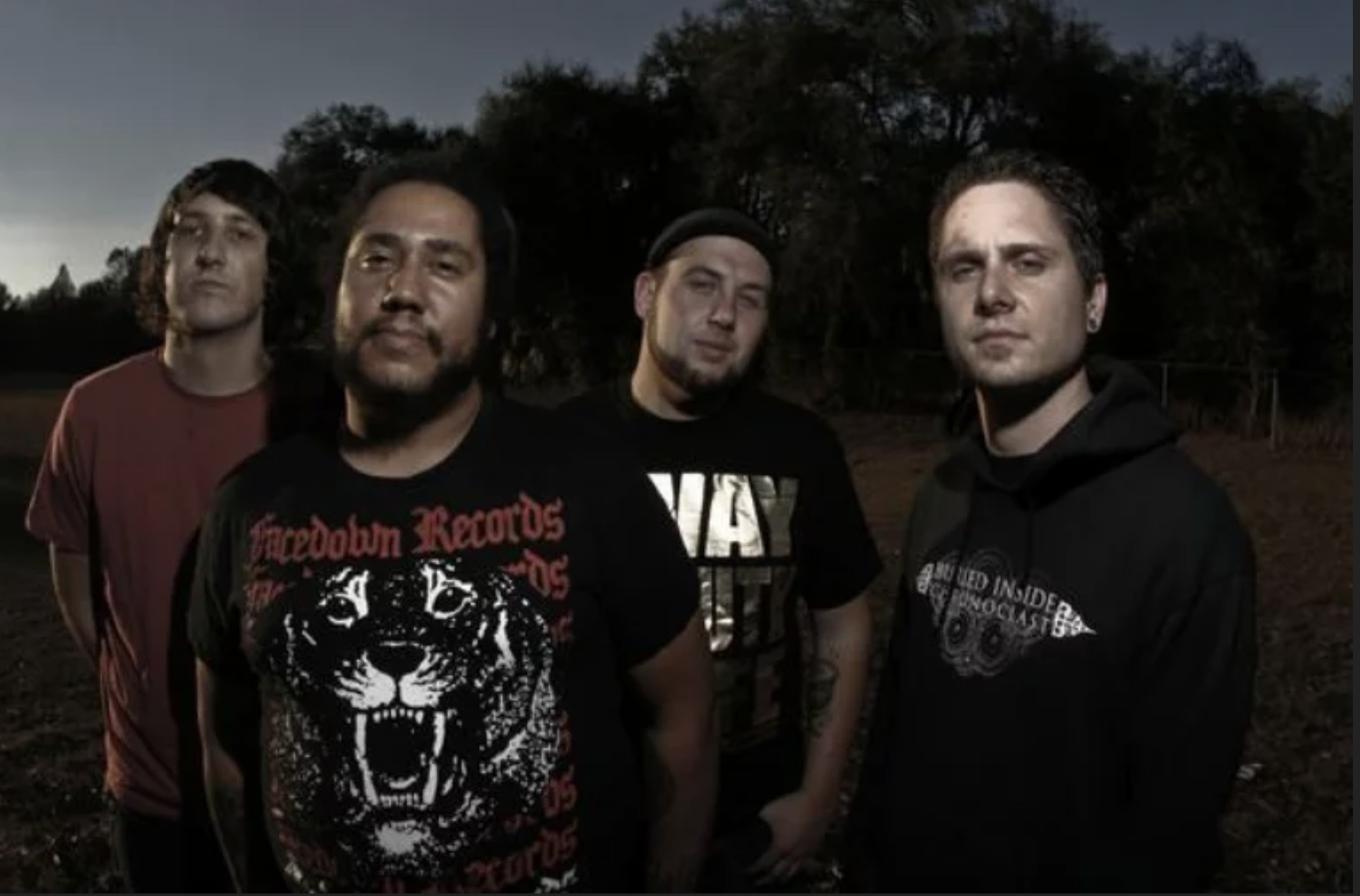

Background information
- Also known as: WrenchInTheWorks, WITW
- Origin: Hartford, Connecticut, USA
- Genres: Mathcore, metalcore, hardcore punk
- Years active: 1999–2010
- Labels: Facedown Records, Sony Red Distribution
- Past members: Darrell Tauro; Justin Mehl; Derek Anderson; Andy Nelson
- Website: Wrench in the Works on Myspace

Wrench in the Works was an American Christian mathcore/metalcore band originating from Hartford, Connecticut. Formed from members of previous bands such as CT's Groundzero, Wrench was initially birthed as a side-project to transcend traditional expectations in the current genre and allow the artists more creative space to improvise and color outside the lines. Gradually the project came into focus as the primary collective endeavor and the band toured extensively during its active years throughout the United States and Canada. Wrench in the Works would undergo lineup/personnel changes at various times including paring down from 5 members to 3 for the writing of "Lost Art of Heaping Coal" with the final lineup consisting of 4 touring/writing members for the "Decrease / Increase" release. In addition to recording music and touring, Wrench in the Works had been featured on TVU and TVU's metalcore show, Battery for the video to their hit song, "Dust Over Time Test." On September 28, 2010, Facedown Records announced that Wrench in the Works had disbanded.

== Prodigal Transmission ==
In 2005, while under the label Redscroll Records, Wrench in the Works released their debut album, Prodigal Transmission.

== Lost Art of Heaping Coal ==
By 2008, Wrench in the Works had left Redscroll Records and signed onto Facedown Records where they released their second album, Lost Art of Heaping Coal.

== Members ==
Core/Founding Members

- Darrell Tauro – vocalist/bass
- Justin Mehl – vocalist/guitar
- Andy Nelson – drums

=== Contributing members ===
- Greg Thomas – guitar ("Decrease / Increase")
- Dan Sherman – guitar
- Derek Anderson – bass
- Ryan Keefe – guitar
- Tj Oslund – vocals (historic-demo)

== Discography ==
Studio albums

Released	Title	Labels
May 16, 2005	Prodigal Transmission	Redscroll Records
August 19, 2008	Lost Art of Heaping Coal	Facedown Records
March 16, 2010	Decrease / Increase	Facedown Records
