= No Innocent Victim =

American Christian hardcore band

- Origin: San Diego, California, U.S.
- Genres: Christian hardcore; hardcore punk; metalcore
- Years active: 1992–2002, 2004–2017, 2024-Present
- Labels: Rescue; Facedown; Solid State; Victory; Blood and Ink (affiliated)
- Members: Jason Moody; Tim Mason; Dave Quiggle; Neil Hartman; Jason Dunn
- Past members: Corey Edelmann; Kurt Love; Judd Morgan; Kyle Fisher; Chris Beckett; John Harbert; Truxton Meadows; Chris Rapier; Nate Jarrell

No Innocent Victim, or N.I.V., is an American Christian hardcore punk band on Facedown Records. It was formed in 1992 in San Diego, California. They released two albums, and then toured with Agnostic Front. In 1998 they signed to Victory Records and recorded the album Flesh and Blood. Many tours followed in the United States, Europe and Japan with bands like Agnostic Front, U.S. Bombs, Terror, Hatebreed, P.O.D., and Madball.

They released Tipping the Scales in 2001, and disbanded the following year. They reformed in 2004 and in 2005, added former xDisciplex A.D. members Dave Quiggle on guitar and Neil Hartman on bass respectively, signed to Facedown Records, and released fifth studio album To Burn Again. After being disbanded for many years, the band reunited in 2017 to play Facedown Fest.

== Members ==
=== Current members ===
- Jason Moody – vocals (1992–present)
- Tim Mason – guitar (2000–present)
- Dave Quiggle – guitar (2005–present)
- Neil Hartman – bass (2005–present)
- Jason Dunn – drums (1996–present)

=== Former members ===
- Kurt Love – drums (1992–1996)
- John Harbert – bass guitar (1992–1996)
- Judd Morgan – bass guitar (1996–1998)
- Corey Edelmann – guitar (1995–2000, 2004–2005)
- Kyle Fisher – bass guitar (1998–2002, 2004)
- Chris Beckett – guitar (1992–1995)
- Truxton Meadows – vocals, guitar (1992)
- Chris Rapier – guitar (1992–1995)

== Discography ==
- Demo self-released (1993)
- Prepared for War split with Overcome and Clay (1995), Boot to Head Records
- Strength (1996), Rescue
- No Compromise (1997), Rescue
- No Innocent Victim / Phanatik split 7-inch EP (1998), Facedown Records
- Untitled Tolerance Records (1998) (compilation)
- The Crazy Engler Brothers EP (1999), Victory
- Flesh and Blood (1999), Victory
- Tipping the Scales (2001), Victory / Solid State
- To Burn Again (2005), Facedown
