= Facedown Records =

American record label

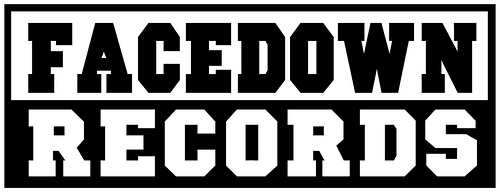
- Founded: 1997
- Founder: Jason Dunn
- Genre: Christian hardcore, Christian metal, Christian rock
- Country of origin: United States
- Location: Fallbrook, California
- Official website: facedownrecords.com

Facedown Records is a Christian rock record label based in Fallbrook, California, that is devoted to hardcore punk and metalcore bands (Christian and secular) with a few death metal acts such as Immortal Souls and Indwelling. Founded by No Innocent Victim drummer Jason Dunn in 1997, the label started small with a number of 7" record releases by Overcome, Dodgin Bullets, and Born Blind. As the label grew, it was able to sign artists for full album deals. xDISCIPLEx released material on Facedown, as well as Figure Four and Point of Recognition. The label also signs straight edge groups such as xDEATHSTARx and xLooking Forwardx.

Bands like Seventh Star and Nodes of Ranvier released well-received records through the label, but it was the release of Turn It Around by Comeback Kid (featuring members of Figure Four) that really brought the label more notice. Comeback Kid toured behind that album for the following two years, eventually leaving Facedown to sign with Victory Records.

== Strike First Records ==
Strike First Records
- Parent company: Facedown Records
- Founded: 2003-2014
- Founder: Jason Dunn
- Genre: Metalcore, post-hardcore, hardcore punk, deathcore
- Country of origin: US
- Location: Fallbrook, California
- Official website: strikefirstrecords.com at the Wayback Machine (archived July 27, 2013)

Strike First Records is Facedown's imprint label, which provides label services for smaller bands, and sometimes acts as a "Facedown training ground"; some Strike First bands, such as Bloody Sunday, Kingston Falls, Call to Preserve, and War of Ages have since moved to Facedown. All of Strike First's releases are limited edition physical issue, and are made using no plastic, from recycled cardboard.

== Dreamt Music ==
Dreamt Music
- Parent company: Facedown Records
- Founded: 2007-2013
- Genre: Hard rock, classic rock, Christian alternative rock, Christian rock
- Country of origin: US
- Location: Fallbrook, California
- Official website: Dreamt Music at the Wayback Machine (archive index)

Late in 2007, the label announced a new imprint, the rock-based Dreamt Music. Dreamt Music focuses more on Christian Alternative and Classic Rock unlike its Christian Metal counterparts Facedown and Strike First Records. See Dreamt Artists for list of Dreamt Music signed artists.

== Facedown Fest ==
Since 2000, the label also hosts an annual two-day "Facedown Fest" in southern California. The rock festival is usually made up of the entire Facedown and Strike First rosters. It has been the site of final performances by xDisciplex A.D., and xDEATHSTARx, Seventh Star, and served as the introduction of xLooking Forwardx to Facedown fans, prior to the band signing with the label. The popularity of the Fest has grown, and in November 2005, an additional two days were held in Annapolis, Maryland for the convenience of those in the eastern part of the U.S. who cannot easily make it to California. For 2017's Facedown Fest, and to celebrate their 20th anniversary, the label is hosting the festival as a three-day event, with old acts such as A Plea for Purging, Bloodlined Calligraphy and xLooking Forwardx and new acts such as Nothing Left and Comrades. The 20th anniversary had many notable acts, including Impending Doom, Sinai Beach, Gideon, Hands and War of Ages.

== Roster ==
=== Current ===
- American Arson
- Bloodlines
- Confessions of a Traitor
- Cultist
- Deathbreaker
- Dens
- Everything in Slow Motion
- Fallstar
- Fleshkiller
- For All Eternity
- HolyName
- Meadows
- Northlander
- Nothing Left
- War of Ages
- Weathered
- What We Do in Secret

=== Past ===
- A Hope for Home (unsigned)
- A Plea for Purging
- Abel (Dreamt Music)
- Ace Augustine (Strike First Records) (previously signed to Red Cord Records)
- Anchor
- Alove for Enemies (members in Letter to the Exiles)
- Altars (unsigned)
- Anam Cara (member also in Twelve Gauge Valentine)
- Ark of the Covenant (unsigned)
- As Hell Retreats (signed to Ain't No Grave Records)
- Attalus
- Bloodlined Calligraphy (Strike First Records)
- Bloody Sunday
- Brutal Fight (Strike First Records)
- Born Blind
- The Burial
- Call to Preserve
- Ceasefire
- Clear Convictions (Strike First Records) (unsigned)
- Colossus
- Comeback Kid (currently signed to Victory Records)
- Comrades
- Counting The Days (Strike First Records)
- The Deal (reunited in November 2008)
- Demise of Eros (Strike First Records; one member went on to join Once Nothing and Haste the Day)
- Dogwood (currently on Roadside Records)
- Dynasty (unsigned)
- Dodgin' Bullets
- Earth from Above
- Extol
- Falling Cycle (one member went on to join Sinai Beach)
- Figure Four (two members are also in Comeback Kid)
- Flee the Seen
- For Today (previously signed to Nuclear Blast Records)
- Gideon (currently on Equal Vision Records)
- The Great Commission (signed to Ain't No Grave Records)
- Hands (Shane Ochsner in Everything in Slow Motion)
- Hanover Saints (one member in Union Hearts)
- Hit The Deck (Strike First Records)
- Hope for the Dying
- Immortal Souls (signed to Rottweiler Records)
- Impending Doom (signed to E1 Music)
- In Due Time (Strike First Records)
- Indwelling (members now in Overcome)
- Inked in Blood
- In the Midst of Lions
- Jesus Wept (Strike First Records)
- Kingston Falls
- Leaders (last show on June 27, 2015)
- Letter to the Exiles
- Means
- Messengers (unsigned, members in Modern Pain, Heretic, Hollow Point, Never In Ruin)
- My Epic (currently signed to Tooth And Nail Records)
- No Innocent Victim
- Nodes of Ranvier
- Nothing Til Blood (Strike First, unsigned)
- One-21
- Opposition of One (Strike First Records)
- Onward to Olympas (one member went on to join Forevermore)
- Overcome
- Point of Recognition
- Poured Out
- The Redemption Song (Strike First Records)
- The Rekoning
- Remove the Veil
- Rival Choir (formerly Mouth of the South)
- Saving Grace
- Seventh Star
- Shapes Stars Make (Dreamt Music) (currently unsigned)
- Silence the Epilogue (Strike First Records)
- Sinai Beach
- Sleep for Sleepers (Dreamt Music) (member in The Wandering Tree)
- Sleeping Giant
- Symphony in Peril
- Take It Back! (Currently signed to Wrong Ones Records)
- This Runs Through (members are now in Sleepwave, Underoath, and To Speak of Wolves)
- Through Solace
- Thieves & Liars (Dreamt Music)
- Those Who Fear
- Today Forever (Strike First Records)
- Torn in Two (changed their name to Red Red, playing local shows)
- Trauma (Strike First Records)
- We the Gathered (Strike First Records)
- Within (Strike First Records)
- Wrench in the Works
- xDEATHSTARx
- xDISCIPLEx A.D. (members went on to form Jesus Wept)
- xLooking Forwardx
- Your Memorial

== See also ==
- Facedown Records discography
