= Brian Hood =

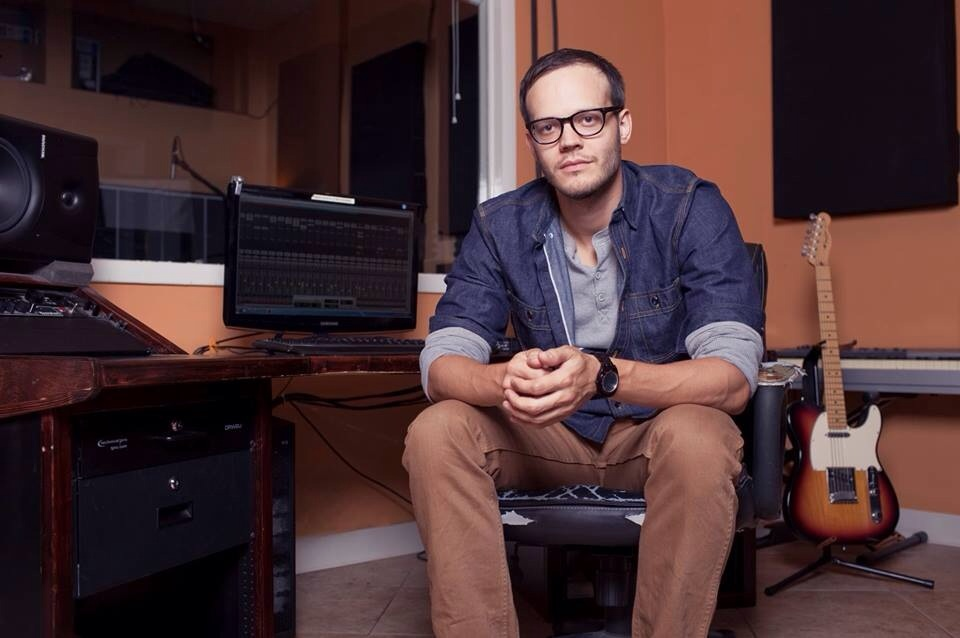
- Brian Hood

Background information
- Born: Brian David Hood; 16 November 1986 (age 39)
- Origin: Huntsville, Alabama, United States
- Occupations: Record producer, audio engineer
- Website: http://www.456recordings.com

Brian David Hood (born November 16, 1986) is an American record producer and owner of 456 Recording Studio in Nashville, Tennessee. He is the former and original drummer of Solid State Records band MyChildren MyBride. He has worked with a number of prominent bands, most notably Memphis May Fire, Erra, Sworn In, Crystal Lake, A Plea for Purging, Invent Animate, Being as an Ocean, The Crimson Armada, and Gideon.

== Production discography ==
Year recorded	Artist	Title	Label	Role
2009	Before There Was Rosalyn	The Fuhrer: An Allegory of a History of Deception	Victory Records	Produced/Engineered/Choir
2010	A Plea for Purging	The Marriage of Heaven and Hell	Facedown Records	Mixed/Mastered
2010	Wake Into the Nightmare	Wake Into the Nightmare	Self-released	N/A
2010	The Devil Wears Prada	Zombie (EP)	Ferret Music	Editing (drums)
2011	Gideon	Costs	Strike First Records	Produced/Engineered/Mixed/Mastered
2011	Hope for the Dying	Dissimulation	Facedown Records	Mixed/Mastered
2011	The Crimson Armada	Conviction	Artery Recordings	Produced/Engineered/Mixed/Mastered/Additional instruments
2011	As Hell Retreats	Volition	Ain't No Grave Recordings	Produced/Engineered/Mixed/Mastered
2011	Greg the Hero	Of Defiance	Self-released	Produced/Mixed/Mastered
2011	Erra	Impulse	Tragic Hero Records	Produced/Engineered/Mixed/Mastered
2012	Invent Animate	Waves (EP)	Self-released	Produced/Engineered/Mixed/Mastered
2012	His Statue Falls	Mistaken for Trophies	Redfield Records	Mastered
2012	Gideon	Milestone	Facedown Records	Produced/Engineered/Mixed/Mastered
2012	For All Eternity	Beyond the Gates	Shock Records, Taperjean Records	Produced
2012	Crystal Lake	"The Fire Inside / Overcome" (single)	Self-released	Mixed/Mastered
2012	Prepared Like a Bride	A Dangerous Journey (EP)	Self-released	Mixed/Mastered
2012	Being As An Ocean	Dear G-d...	InVogue Records	Produced/Engineered/Mixed/Mastered
2012	Surroundings	"Roses"	Self-released	Mastered
2013
2013	Electric Callboy	"Cinema" (Skrillex, Benny Benassi cover)	Earache Records	Mastering
2013	A Night in Texas	Invigoration (EP)	Skull and Bones Records	Mixed/Mastered
2013	I, Valiance	"The Black Sun"	Self-released	Mixed/Mastered
2013	Stand Alone Complex	Animate (EP)	Self-released	Recorded/Mixed/Mastered
2013	Sworn In	The Death Card	Razor & Tie Records	Engineered/Mixed/Mastered
2013	Greg the Hero	"Usurper"	Self-released	Mixed/Mastered
2013	Erra	Augment	Tragic Hero Records	Recorded/Mixed/Mastered
2014	Capsize	I’ve Been Tearing Myself Apart (7")	Equal Vision Records	N/A
2014	Surroundings	Of Bane, Burden & Change	Highland Records	Mixed/Mastered
2014	Eternal Void	Catharsis	Self-released, Tragic Hero Records (2018 re-release)	Mixed/Mastered
2014	Sienna Skies	Seasons	InVogue Records	Produced/Recorded
2014	Crystal Lake	Cubes (EP)	Cube Records	Mixed/Mastered
2014	The Lane Cove	Personised (EP)	Self-released	Mixed/Mastered
2014	Invent Animate	Everchanger	Tragic Hero Records	Produced/Engineered/Mixed/Mastered
2014	Colossus	Badlands	Facedown Records	Mixed/Mastered
2014	Erra	Moments of Clarity (EP)	Sumerian Records	Recorded/Mixed/Mastered
2015	A Night in Texas	The God Delusion	Skull and Bones Records	Mixed/Mastered
2015	My Ransomed Soul	Trilateral	Self-released	Mixed/Mastered
2015	Stand Alone Complex	Dreamstate (EP)	Self-released	Recorded/Mixed
2015	Gift Giver	Shitlife	Century Media Records	Mixed
2015	Sentinel	The Primordial Ruin (EP)	Self-released	Mixed/Mastered
2015	For All Eternity	Metanoia	Facedown Records	Produced/Engineered/Mixed
2015	Memphis May Fire	Unconditional (Deluxe Edition)	Rise Records	Remixed/Remastered
2015	Sirens & Sailors	Rising Moon: Setting Sun	Artery Recordings	Engineered/Mixed/Mastered
2015	In Search of Solace	From Me//From Within	Self-released	Engineered/Mixed/Mastered
2015	Codex	Glass Planet (EP)	Self-released	Mixed/Mastered
2015	Crystal Lake	The Sign	Cube Records (JPN), Artery Recordings (US), JPU Records (EU), Halfcut Records & Shock Records (AUS)	Mixed/Mastered
2016	Iconoclast	HalluciNation	Self-released	Mixed/Mastered
2016	Aerial	Foresight (EP)	Self-released	Mixed/Mastered
2016	Zephyr	"The Precipice"	Self-released	Mixed/Mastered
2016	Zephyr	"The Echo"	Self-released	Mixed/Mastered
2016	Hollow City	Hollow City (EP)	Outlive Entertainment	Recorded
2016	Arras	Hanging On (EP)	Self-released	Mixed/Mastered
2016	Crystal Lake	True North	Cube Records (JPN), Artery Recordings (US)	Mixed/Mastered
2017	Above, Below	The Sowers of Discord (EP)	Self-released	Mixed/Mastered
2017	Suasion	Singles (EP)	Self-released	Mixed/Mastered
2017	In Search of Solace	Regression/Progression	Self-released	Mixed/Mastered
2017	Tide Has Turned	Void (EP)	Self-released	Mixed/Mastered
2017	Speech Patterns	Without a Sound (EP)	Self-released	Mixed/Mastered
2017	Driftless	Still (EP)	Self-released	Mixed/Mastered
2018	Emuness	Equilibrium	Luxor Records	Mastered
2021	Evil Prevails	Dirt and Decay (EP)	Self-released	Mastered
