= List of progressive metalcore bands =

The following is a list of bands that perform progressive metalcore, a fusion of progressive metal and metalcore.

== List of bands ==
- The Afterimage
- After the Burial
- Architects
- August Burns Red
- Between The Buried and Me
- Born of Osiris
- Crystal Lake
- Currents
- Destrage
- Erra
- Forevermore
- From A Second Story Window
- Glass Cloud
- The Human Abstract
- I, the Breather
- Intervals
- Invent Animate
- Jinjer
- LOATHE
- Make Them Suffer
- Misery Signals
- Monuments
- Napoleon
- Northlane
- Novelists FR
- Oceans Ate Alaska
- Pathways
- Periphery
- Polaris
- Reflections
- Silent Planet
- Spiritbox
- Tesseract
- Textures
- Thornhill
- Trivium
- Veil of Maya
- Volumes

== See also ==
- List of metalcore bands
- List of progressive metal artists
