= Disparity (Oceans Ate Alaska album) =

Studio album by Oceans Ate Alaska
- Released: 1 September 2022
- Recorded: 2020–2021
- Genres: Metalcore, progressive metalcore
- Length: 32:19
- Label: Fearless

Oceans Ate Alaska chronology
| Hikari (2017) | Disparity (2022) | Purge (2027) |

Singles from Disparity
- 1. "Metamorph" Released: 11 November 2020; 2. "New Dawn" Released: 1 July 2022; 3. "Nova" Released: 19 August 2022; 4. "Paradigm" Released: 11 December 2022

Professional ratings
Review scores
| Source | Rating |
|---|---|
| Distorted Sound | 6/10 |
| Ghost Cult | 7/10 |

Disparity is the third full-length album by British metalcore band Oceans Ate Alaska, released on 1 September 2022 through Fearless Records. It is the last album before the band departed from the record label, and the last one to feature original vocalist James Harrison, who had previously recorded vocals for the band's 2015 album Lost Isles, and longtime lead guitarist Adam Zytkiewicz. Founding rhythm guitarist James Kennedy would later take over lead guitar, and Harrison was replaced by Spitting Teeth vocalist Joel Heywood.

== Background and release ==
After releasing a new single titled "Metamorph" in 2020, on 1 July 2022, the band released the single "New Dawn". On 19 August 2022, they released another single, "Nova", with which they announced their forthcoming album Disparity, which was released on 1 September. According to James Kennedy, the album name came from disparity, meaning 'a great difference;' "There's a lot of 'dystopian world' themes and stories lyrically in this album." On 11 December 2022, the band released a live video for the track "Paradigm". On 20 January 2023, the band released the instrumental edition of the album.

== Reception ==
Disparity has gained mixed reception on the positive side from critics. Distorted Sound Magazine has considered this album "a pretty decent effort from OCEANS ATE ALASKA. Considering it is only their third body of work, their high-energy, impactful metalcore sound is just so addictive throughout the release. Progressive melodies, warped time signatures and insane vocals make Disparity what it is – a solid record." Ghost Cult Magazine mentions that "Disparity isn't a hugely innovative album, but it doesn't set out to be; the diversity it showcases melds sublimely throughout and hints that there should be plenty more from them going forward."

== Track listing ==
All music is composed by Oceans Ate Alaska.

| No. | Title | Length |
|---|---|---|
| 1. | "Paradigm" | 2:44 |
| 2. | "Nova" | 3:32 |
| 3. | "Metamorph" | 2:43 |
| 4. | "Shallow Graves" | 3:19 |
| 5. | "Sol" | 3:21 |
| 6. | "Dead Behind the Eyes" (featuring Eric Vanlerberghe of I Prevail) | 3:01 |
| 7. | "Plague Speech" | 2:44 |
| 8. | "Disparity" | 1:32 |
| 9. | "Empty Space" | 3:15 |
| 10. | "New Dawn" | 1:49 |
| 11. | "Hallucinogen" | 4:19 |
| Total length: | | 32:19 |

== Personnel ==
Oceans Ate Alaska

- James Harrison – lead vocals
- Adam Zytkiewicz – lead guitar, backing vocals
- James "Jibs" Kennedy – rhythm guitar, backing vocals
- Chris Turner – drums, percussion
- Mike Stanton – bass guitar

Additional musicians

- Eric Vanlerberghe (I Prevail) - guest vocals on "Dead Behind the Eyes"
