= Silence Outlives the Earth =

Studio album by Erra
- Released: March 6, 2026
- Genres: Progressive metalcore; djent
- Length: 42:44
- Label: UNFD
- Producer: Daniel Braunstein

Erra chronology
Cure (2024)	Silence Outlives the Earth (2026)

Singles from Silence Outlives the Earth
- 1. "Gore of Being" Released: July 9, 2025; 2. "Echo Sonata" Released: July 18, 2025; 3. "Further Eden" Released: January 29, 2026; 4. "I. The Many Names of God" Released: February 19, 2026

Silence Outlives the Earth (stylized in lower case) is the seventh studio album by American progressive metalcore band Erra. It was released on March 6, 2026, through UNFD and was produced by Daniel Braunstein.

== Background and promotion ==
On July 9, 2025, the band released the first single "Gore of Being", ahead of Architects' North American tour, on which they were supporting, and announced another single would release that month. The track was the first to be written by guitarist Clint Tustin, who joined the band in 2023. The following week on July 18, the next single "Echo Sonata" was released.

On January 29, 2026, the band announced the title, release date, cover art and track list for the album alongside the release of the third single, "Further Eden". The release date of March 6 was also the start date for the band's The Silence Follows Tour with Currents, and support from Aviana and Caskets. On February 19, the band released the fourth single, titled "I. The Many Names of God", titled such as the first of a trilogy of songs with a "distinct shift in tone" from the rest of the record.

== Composition ==
Silence Outlives the Earth has been described by critics as progressive metalcore and djent.

== Critical reception ==
Professional ratings
Review scores
Source	Rating
Boolin Tunes	10/10
Distorted Sound	8/10
Kerrang!	3/5 stars
New Noise Magazine	5/5 stars
Wall of Sound	7.5/10

Silence Outlives the Earth received generally positive reviews from critics. Jonathan Tan of Boolin Tunes stated that it was "Erra at their best," going on to say the album "condensed [their sound] into a concise, yet extensive experience." Colin Jones of Distorted Sound Magazine said the band had "achieved the perfect balance" between the djent sound of the band's self-titled record, and the more "mainstream" sound of the previous album, Cure. Emma Wilkes of Kerrang! was slightly more critical, stating "it isn't the easiest to connect with." Lamar Ramos of New Noise Magazine however gave high praise stating the album was "packed with layers and intricate details," going further to say it "reminds you how high the ceiling for modern metalcore can still be."

== Track listing ==
All lyrics are written by Jesse Cash and J.T. Cavey; all music is composed by Alex Ballew, Daniel Braunstein, and Cash, with additional writers where noted.

Silence Outlives the Earth track listing
No.	Title	Music	Length
1.	"Stelliform"	Cavey	3:54
2.	"Further Eden"	Cavey; Clint Tustin	3:32
3.	"Gore of Being"	Cavey; Tustin	3:52
4.	"Black Cloud"		3:38
5.	"Cicada Siren"	Cavey	3:57
6.	"Echo Sonata"	Cavey; Tustin	4:28
7.	"Lucid Threshold"	Cavey; Tustin	3:49
8.	"Spiral (Of Liminal Infinity)"	Cavey	4:17
9.	"I. The Many Names of God"	Cavey	3:06
10.	"II. In the Gut of the Wolf"	Cavey; Tustin	3:31
11.	"III. Twilight in the Reflection of Dreams"	Cavey	4:40
Total length:			42:44

Notes

- All tracks are stylized in lower case.

== Personnel ==
Credits adapted from Tidal.

Erra

- J.T. Cavey – lead vocals
- Jesse Cash – guitar, clean vocals
- Clint Tustin – guitar
- Conor Hesse – bass
- Alex Ballew – drums

Additional personnel

- Daniel Braunstein – production, engineering, mixing, mastering

== Accolades ==
Awards and nominations for Silence Outlives the Earth
Year	Award ceremony	Category	Result	Ref.
2026	Morecore Music Awards	Best Album Artwork	Nominated	

== Charts ==
Chart performance for Silence Outlives the Earth
Chart (2026)	Peak position
UK Album Downloads (Official Charts)	28
