= Trilateral =

Trilateral is something having three sides or perspectives and may refer to:

- Triangle, a geometric figure with three sides and three vertices. The synonym trilateral emphasizes a definition in terms of sides rather than vertices.
- The Trilateral Ankara cooperation process, a process in Pakistani–Turkish or Afghan–Turkish relations
- Trilateral Commission, a private organization, established to foster closer cooperation among the United States, Europe and Japan.
- Trilateral Patent Offices, the European Patent Office (EPO), the Japan Patent Office (JPO) and the United States Patent and Trademark Office (USPTO).
- Trilateral Progression, the fourth album by Neuraxis.
- Trilateral symmetry, a three-fold form of rotational symmetry.
- Retinoblastoma is said to be trilateral if it occurs in both eyes and also in the pineal gland.
- North American Leaders' Summit, or Trilateral Summit, between Canada, Mexico, and the United States
- Trilateral (album)

== See also ==
- Trilateration, a method for determining the intersections of three sphere surfaces given the centers and radii of the three spheres.
- Egyptian triliteral signs are symbols which represent a specific sequence of three consonants, also vowels and consonants, in the language.
