= Hikari (Oceans Ate Alaska album) =

Studio album by Oceans Ate Alaska
- Released: 28 July 2017
- Recorded: 2016–2017
- Genre: Metalcore; progressive metalcore
- Length: 33:33
- Label: Fearless
- Producer: Nick Sampson

Oceans Ate Alaska chronology
Lost Isles (2015)	Hikari (2017)	Disparity (2022)

Singles from Hikari
- 1. "Covert" Released: 25 May 2017; 2. "Escapist" Released: 12 June 2017; 3. "Hansha" Released: 28 July 2017

Professional ratings
Review scores
Source	Rating
Team Rock	3/5 stars

Hikari is the second full-length album by British metalcore band Oceans Ate Alaska, released on 28 July 2017 through Fearless Records. It is the only album to feature Jake Noakes who replaced the original vocalist James Harrison, after the latter's departure in late 2016.

== Track listing ==
All music is composed by Oceans Ate Alaska.

No.	Title	Length
1.	"Benzaiten" (featuring Alex Teyen of Black Tongue)	3:36
2.	"Sarin"	3:08
3.	"Covert"	3:13
4.	"Hansha"	3:38
5.	"Deadweight"	3:05
6.	"Veridical"	1:50
7.	"Entrapment"	2:59
8.	"Hikari"	3:21
9.	"Birth-Marked"	3:05
10.	"Ukiyo" (featuring Josh Manuel of Issues)	1:19
11.	"Escapist"	4:19
Total length:		33:33

== Personnel ==
Oceans Ate Alaska

- Jake Noakes – lead vocals
- Adam Zytkiewicz – lead guitar, backing vocals
- James "Jibs" Kennedy – rhythm guitar, backing vocals
- Chris Turner – drums, percussions, engineering
- Mike Stanton – bass guitar

Additional musicians

- Alex Teyen (Black Tongue) - guest vocals on "Benzaiten", guest writing
- Josh Manuel (Issues) - drums on "Ukiyo", guest writing

Production

- Nick Sampson – production, engineering, mixing, mastering, guest writing
- Mike McLafferty, Clem Cherry and Tyler Riley - guest writing

Management

- Jason Mageau (Royal Division Management) - management
- Eric Powell (Spotlight Touring) - world booking excluding Europe/UK
- Maarten Janssen (Loud Noise) - Europe/UK booking
- Cody Demavivas (Fearless Records) - A&R
- Kristin Biskup (Fearless Records) - project management

Artwork

- Karl Pfeiffer - photography
- Florian Mihr - art direction, layout design
