= Augment (album) =

Studio album by Erra
- Released: October 29, 2013
- Studios: 456 Recordings, Nashville, Tennessee, U.S.
- Genre: Progressive metalcore
- Length: 52:43
- Label: Tragic Hero
- Producer: Brian Hood

Erra chronology
| Impulse (2011) | Augment (2013) | Moments of Clarity (2014) |

Singles from Augment
- 1. "Pulse" Released: September 17, 2013; 2. "Hybrid Earth" Released: October 22, 2013

Augment is the second studio album by American progressive metalcore band Erra. It was released on October 29, 2013, through Tragic Hero Records and was produced by Brian Hood. It is their last album with original vocalist Garrison Lee and guitarist Alan Rigdon, and their first with bassist Sean Price after Adam Hicks' departure. It is also their first album to chart.

Professional ratings
Review scores
| Source | Rating |
|---|---|
| AllMusic | 3.5/5 stars |

== Track listing ==
| No. | Title | Length |
|---|---|---|
| 1. | "Alpha Seed" | 4:57 |
| 2. | "Pulse" | 4:01 |
| 3. | "Dreamwalkers" | 3:56 |
| 4. | "Frostbite" | 3:52 |
| 5. | "Hybrid Earth" | 4:20 |
| 6. | "Rebirth" | 4:50 |
| 7. | "Ultraviolet" | 4:51 |
| 8. | "Spirits Away" | 4:18 |
| 9. | "Prometheus" | 4:14 |
| 10. | "Crimson" | 4:31 |
| 11. | "Augment" | 1:13 |
| 12. | "Dementia" | 7:35 |
| Total length: | | 52:43 |

== Personnel ==
Credits retrieved from AllMusic.

Erra

- Garrison Lee – lead vocals
- Jesse Cash – guitar, bass, clean vocals, backing unclean vocals
- Alan Rigdon – guitar, bass, backing unclean vocals
- Sean Price – bass (credited, but does not perform)
- Alex Ballew – drums

Additional musicians

- Trevor Hinesley – additional vocals
- Tyler Riley – additional vocals
- Leslie Thompson – additional vocals

Additional personnel

- Brian Hood – production, engineering, mastering, mixing, recording
- Aaron Marsh – artwork, design
- Luis Lopez Descartes – band photography

== Charts ==
| Chart (2013) | Peak position |
|---|---|
| Billboard 200 | 117 |
| Heatseekers Albums | 1 |
| Hard Rock Albums | 13 |
| Top Rock Albums | 35 |
