= Neon (Erra album) =

Studio album by Erra
- Released: August 10, 2018
- Genre: Progressive metalcore
- Length: 42:20
- Label: Sumerian
- Producer: Beau Burchell; Taylor Larson

Erra chronology
Drift (2016)	Neon (2018)	Erra (2021)

Singles from Neon
- 1. "Disarray" Released: June 12, 2018; 2. "Breach" Released: July 10, 2018

Neon is the fourth studio album by American progressive metalcore band Erra. It was released on August 10, 2018 through Sumerian Records. The album was produced by Beau Burchell and Taylor Larson. It is the band's first album with bassist Conor Hesse and their last release to be published on this label before the band signed to UNFD in 2020.

Professional ratings
Review scores
Source	Rating
Dead Press!	6/10
Metal Noise	6.5/10
Metal Trenches	8/10

== Track listing ==
No.	Title	Length
1.	"Breach"	4:42
2.	"Monolith"	3:57
3.	"Signal Fire"	4:17
4.	"Valhalla"	4:56
5.	"Hyperreality"	3:58
6.	"Ghost of Nothing"	4:14
7.	"Disarray"	3:50
8.	"Expiate"	3:33
9.	"Unify"	3:53
10.	"Ultimata"	4:56
Total length:		42:20

== Personnel ==
Credits retrieved from AllMusic.

Erra

- J.T. Cavey – unclean vocals, backing clean vocals
- Jesse Cash – guitar, clean vocals
- Sean Price – guitar
- Conor Hesse – bass
- Alex Ballew – drums, vocal engineering

Additional personnel

- Beau Burchell – production, engineering, recording
- Taylor Larson – production, mastering, mixing
- John Maciel – assistant engineering
- Andrew Jarrin, Cory Hajde and Jason Mageau – management
- Mete Yafet – artwork
- Nick Walters – A&R
- Daniel McBride – layout

== Charts ==
Chart (2018)	Peak position
Billboard 200	152
US Heatseekers Albums	1
