= Oceans Ate Alaska =

British metalcore band

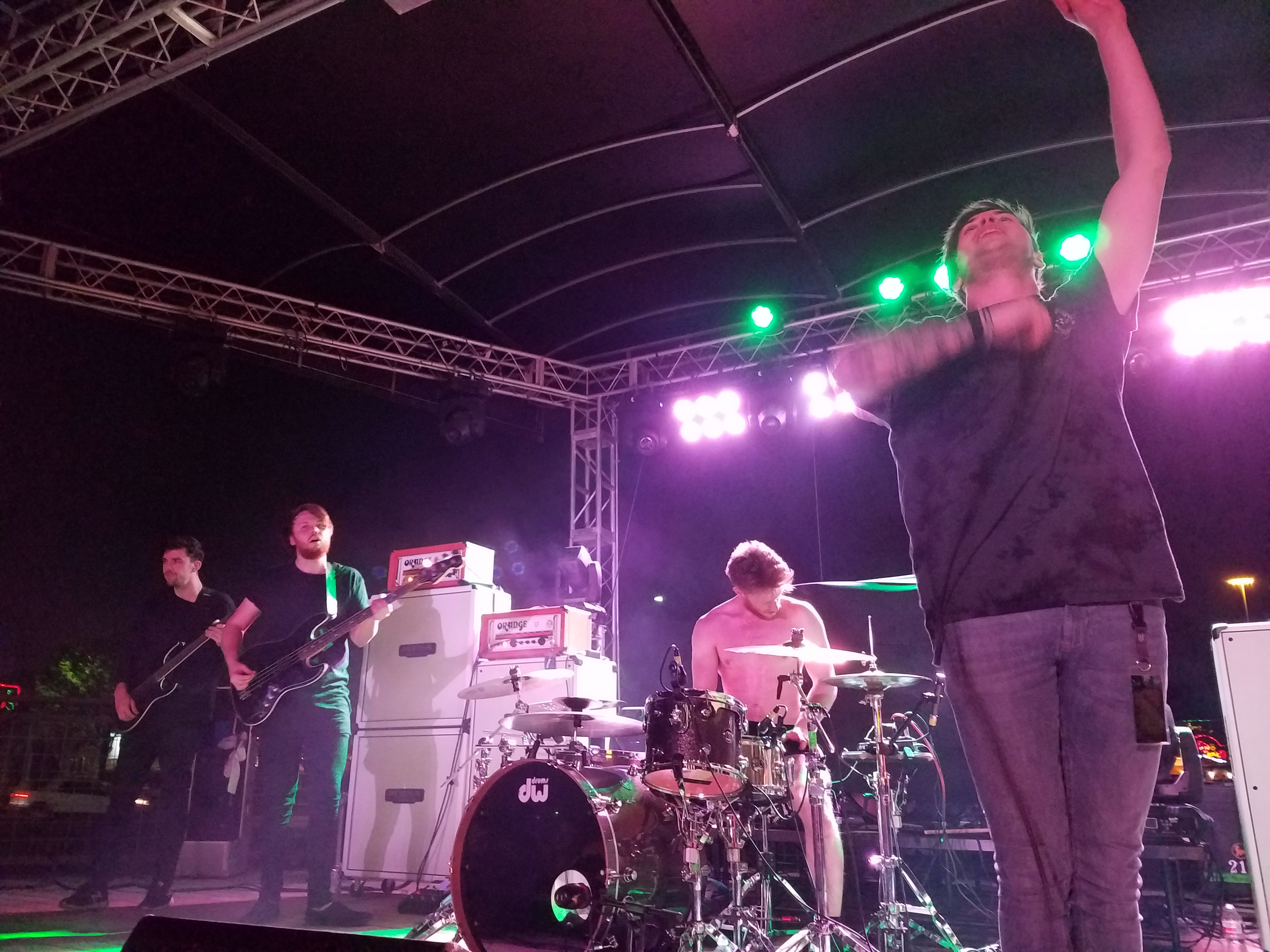
- Oceans Ate Alaska performing in 2017

Background information
- Origin: Birmingham, West Midlands, England
- Genres: Metalcore; progressive metalcore
- Years active: 2010–present
- Labels: Fearless; Density; Vagrant
- Members: Chris Turner; James "Jibs" Kennedy; Mike Stanton; Joel Heywood
- Past members: Alex Hurdley; Josh Salthouse; George Arvanitis; Jake Noakes; James Harrison; Adam Zytkiewicz
- Website: oceansatealaska.co.uk

Oceans Ate Alaska are a British metalcore band from Birmingham, formed in 2010. The band was signed to Fearless Records and are known for "uniting boundaries between multiple genres in modern metal" and for "fusing unpredictable polyrhythms and sporadic partnering of melodic and dissonant passages". Original vocalist, James Harrison came up with the band name; naming it after the 1958 Lituya Bay earthquake and megatsunami that swallowed one of Alaska's gulfs.

== History ==
Oceans Ate Alaska was founded in 2010 by Birmingham University's students James Harrison, James 'Jibs' Kennedy, Josh Salthouse, Alex Hurdley and Chris Turner. The band would go on to release their first single, "Taming Lions" on 4 August followed by their second single "Clocks" on the 26th, both accompanied by a music video and being released through Great Escape Records. On 7 May 2012 the band released their debut EP, "Into the Deep" through Vagrant Records they would go onto rerelease the EP later that year on Density Records. On 2 April the band released the music video for their song, "To Catch a Flame" from their new EP. The band released a physical edition of their "Into the Deep" EP on 13 November thanks to their new label, Density.

On 7 October 2014, the band announced that they have signed to Fearless Records and will be releasing their forthcoming debut album in 2015. Along with the announcement the band also released their first song from their new album, "Blood Brothers".

On 12 November, the band announced that they would be featured on Fearless Records' compilation album Punk Goes Pop 6, covering Beyoncé's "Drunk in Love".

On 6 January 2015, the second single and lead track from their new album, "Floorboards" was released and three days later the band released a guitar play through of the track. On the 19th the band released a video detailing the story behind their new album, Lost Isles.

On 27 January 2015, the band released their music video for the third single from their new album, "Vultures and Sharks".

The band would go on to release their debut album Lost Isles on 24 February 2015.

On 11 May, the band released a music video for their song "High Horse". Three days later Oceans Ate Alaska were announced to be playing their first ever United States tour in the Summer of 2015 as part of Northlane's Node Tour along with Like Moths to Flames and In Hearts Wake.

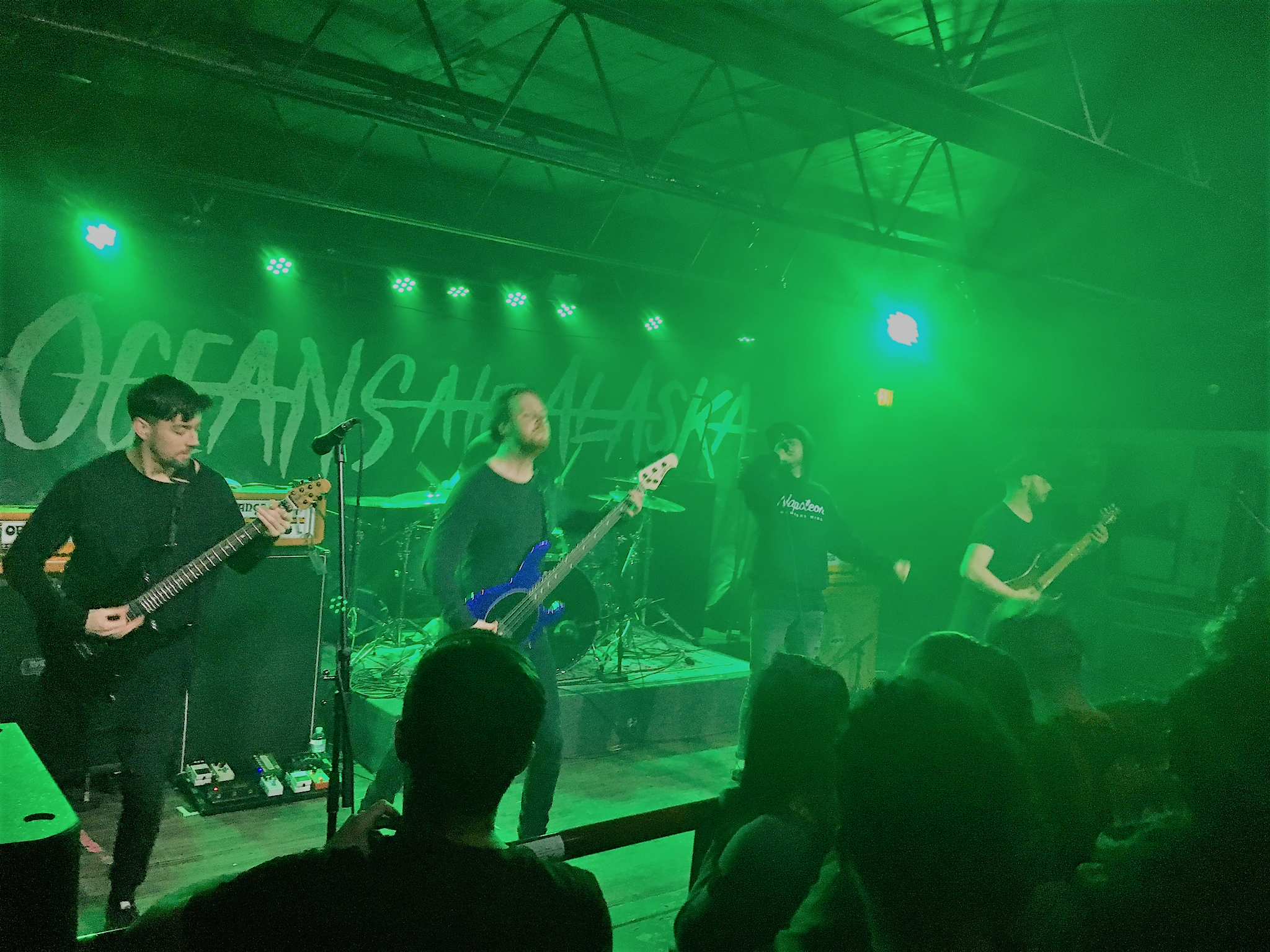
Oceans Ate Alaska in 2018.

The band would go on to play the entire 2016 Vans Warped Tour in the United States alongside bands like Atreyu, Sum 41, Wage War, Whitechapel, New Found Glory, The Word Alive and many more groups.

On 16 December 2016, the band announced that they had parted ways with vocalist James Harrison, but would remain on good terms. They added that they would reveal their new vocalist in the coming weeks.

On 3 February 2017, the band officially revealed that Jake Noakes would replace Harrison as the band's lead vocalist. The band released the following statement in regards to the replacement: " Our new vocalist is our very close personal friend and incredibly talented singer/screamer Jake Noakes from the UK! It's our honour to be performing alongside of him from here on out, he's an absolute monster!"

On 25 May 2017, the band released "Covert", the first single with Noakes performing vocals.

On 9 June 2017, the band officially announced their sophomore album, "Hikari", would be released on 28 July and would feature a blend of Japanese instruments with drummer Chris Turner, stating that "We have a huge amount of respect for Japanese culture, especially their music" and "These unique and beautiful instruments have inspired us to create something brand new, and we are beyond proud of the end result!". The following day, Fearless Records released a video introducing fans of Oceans Ate Alaska to the band's new vocalist, Jake Noakes.

On 28 July 2017, the band released their album Hikari as well as a music video for their song "Hansha".

On 14 September 2017, the band was announced to be participating as support for Wage War's massively heavy five band "Deadweight Tour Part Two" alongside Gideon, Varials and Loathe beginning on 24 November.

On 10 November 2017, the band released instrumental editions of Lost Isles and Hikari.

On 5 January 2018, the band revealed that they will be participating on We Came As Romans' "Cold Like War Tour" with The Plot in You, Currents and Tempting Fate.

On 15 August 2018, the band was announced to opening for Like Moths to Flames on their fall "Dark Divine" tour alongside Phinehas and Novelists beginning on 8 November.

On 12 November, the band released their cover of Sting's "Shape of My Heart". The song was then followed by drummer Chris Turner speaking on the songs that saved his life.

On 10 June 2019, the band announced on their Facebook page that they are currently in the studio working on their upcoming third album.

On 27 August 2019, the band was announced as part of the tenth anniversary "Macmillan Fest" along with 60 other musical acts. The event will host the "Great British Grind-Off" an epic battle of the bands and will take place on 7 September in Nottingham.

On 11 November 2020, the band released a new song and music video entitled "Metamorph", revealing the return of founding lead vocalist James Harrison to the band, while former vocalist Jake Noakes officially announcing his departure on his personal Instagram account due to his dream of prolonging his tattoo business.

On 1 July 2022, the band released the single "New Dawn", their first new music since 2020. On 19 August 2022, they released another single, "Nova", with which they announced their forthcoming album Disparity, which was released on 1 September. Per guitarist James Kennedy, the album name came from disparity, meaning 'a great difference;' "There’s a lot of ‘dystopian world’ themes and stories lyrically in this album." On 20 January 2023, the band released the instrumental edition of the album.

== Band members ==
Before coming to the current line up, the band went through various member changes. The release of 'Clocks' music video feature James Harrison on vocals, Jibs on rhythm guitar, Josh Salthouse on lead guitar, Alex Hudrey on bass, and Chris Turner on drums. In 2012, the original bassist, Alex Hurdley left the band and was replaced by George Arvanitis for a short amount of time. After the release of 'To Catch a Flame' music video, Josh Salthouse and George Arvanitis left the band and were soon replaced by Adam Zytkiewicz and Mike Stanton respectively. In late 2016, frontman James Harrison parted ways with the band due to personal differences. On 1 February 2017, via their official facebook page, the band announced that they have found a new vocalist, Jake Noakes, in addition of Jake being a long time friend with Chris. On 11 November 2020, original vocalist James Harrison returned to the line-up while Jake Noakes stepped down from his position. Jake stated on his Instagram account that he was happy to see James back. In January 2024, James Harrison left the band again, and was replaced by Spitting Teeth vocalist Joel Heywood. Adam Zytkiewicz also left the band around the same time, with James Kennedy taking over both lead and rhythm guitars.

Oceans Ate Alaska, live at With Full Force 2018

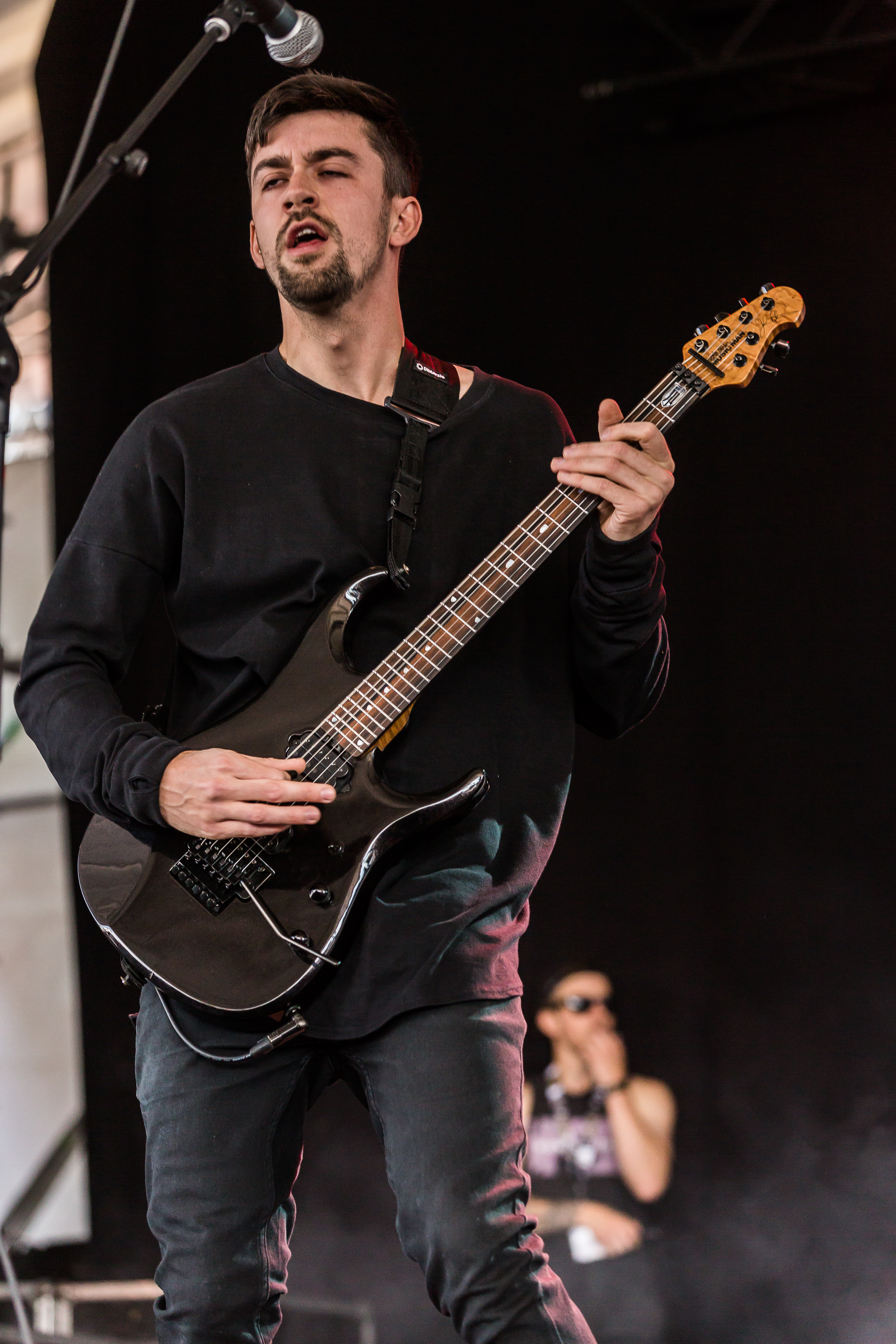
Guitarist James Kennedy

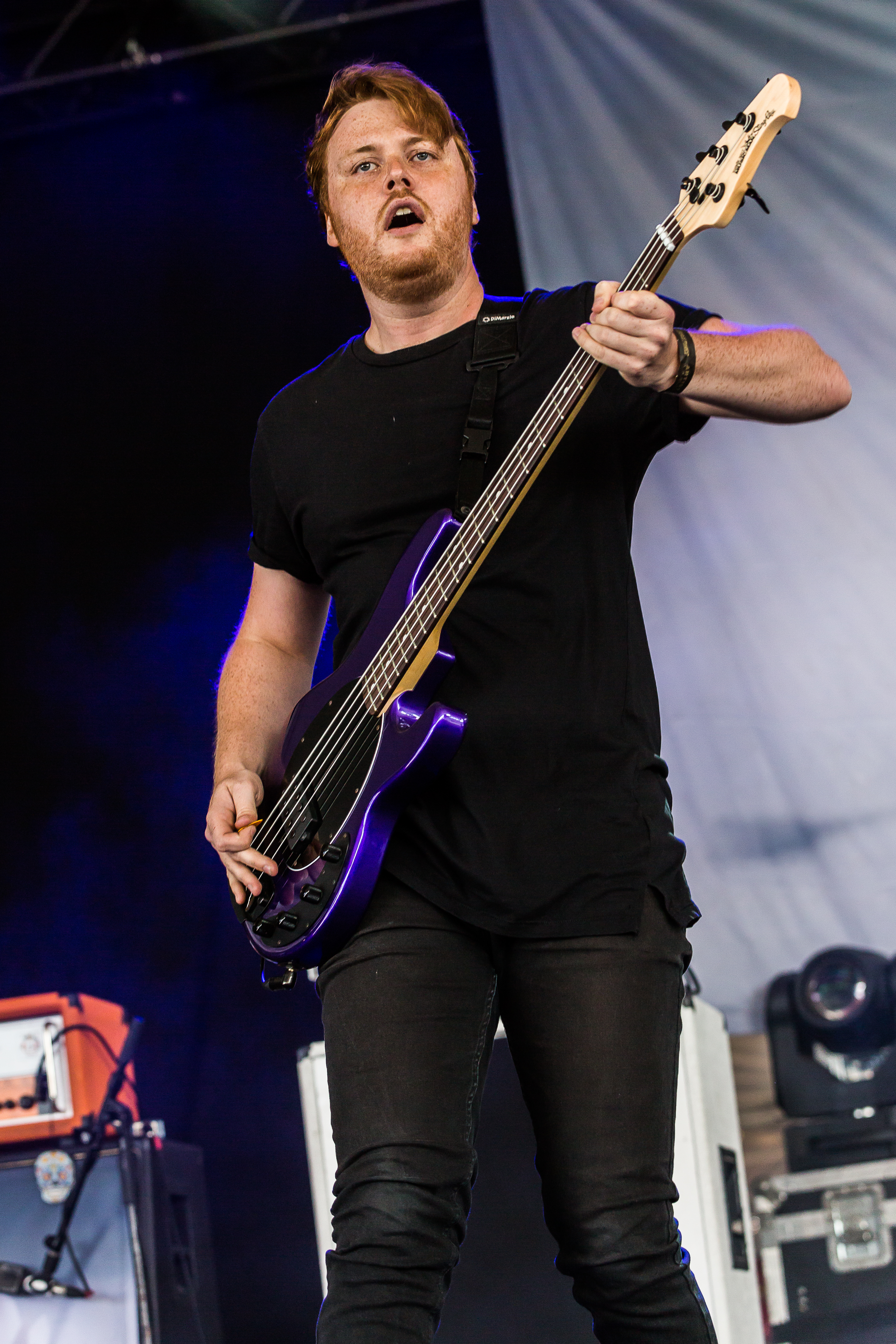
Bassist Mike Stanton

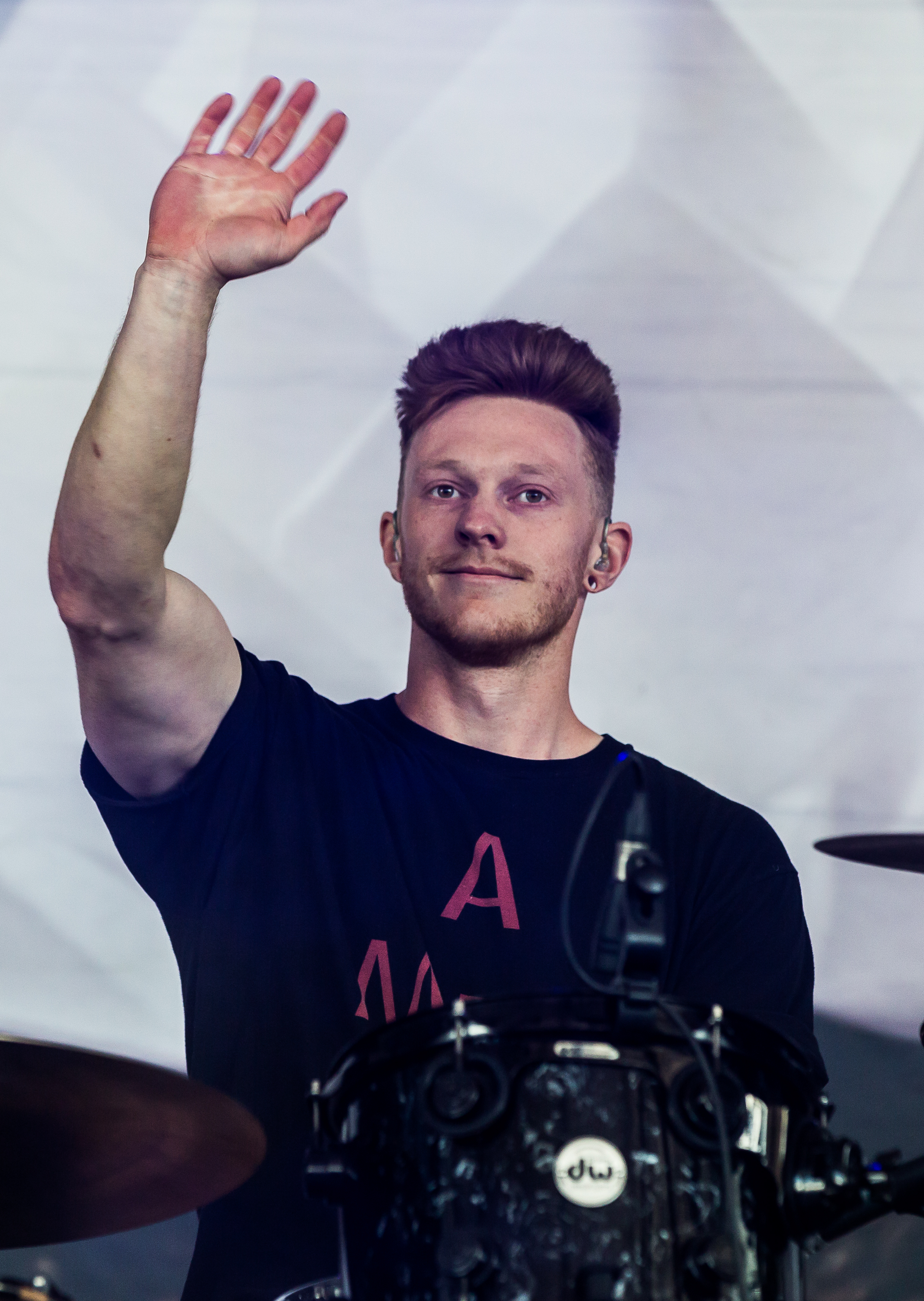
Drummer Chris Turner

Current

- Chris Turner – drums (2010–present)
- James "Jibs" Kennedy – rhythm guitar, backing vocals (2010–present), lead guitar (2024–present)
- Mike Stanton – bass (2013–present)
- Joel Heywood – lead vocals (2024–present)

Former

- Alex Hurdley – bass (2010–2012)
- Josh Salthouse – lead guitar (2010–2012)
- George Arvanitis – bass (2012)
- Matt Beale – bass (2012-2013)
- Jake Noakes – lead vocals (2017–2020)
- James Harrison – lead vocals (2010–2016, 2020–2024)
- Adam Zytkiewicz – lead guitar, backing vocals (2012–2024)

Timeline

== Discography ==
Studio albums

- Lost Isles (2015)
- Hikari (2017)
- Disparity (2022)
- Purge (2027)

EPs

- Taming Lions (2011)
- Into the Deep (2012)

Demos

- "The Puppeteer" (2010)
- "Reasons to Stare at the Sun" (2010)

Singles/music videos

- "Clocks" (2011)
- "To Catch a Flame" (2012)
- "No Strings" (2013)
- "Blood Brothers" (2014)
- "Floorboards" (2015)
- "Vultures and Sharks" (2015)
- "High Horse" (2016)
- "Covert" (2017)
- "Escapist" (2017)
- "Hansha" (2017)
- "Shape of My Heart" (2018)
- "Metamorph" (2020)
- "New Dawn" (2022)
- "Nova" (2022)
- "Sol" (2022)
- "Endless Hollow" (2024)
- "Onsra" (2024)
- "Bring You Back" (2026)
