= Badlands (Colossus album) =

Studio album by Colossus
- Released: September 16, 2014
- Genre: Christian metal, metalcore
- Length: 31:27
- Label: Facedown
- Producer: Josh Barber, Colossus

Colossus chronology
Time & Eternal (2013)	Badlands (2014)

Badlands is the second studio album from Christian metalcore band Colossus, released by Facedown Records on September 16, 2014. As with their debut album, Time & Eternal, Colossus worked with Josh Barber on the production of this album.

== Reception ==
Professional ratings
Review scores
Source	Rating
Indie Vision Music	4/5 stars
Jesus Freak Hideout	4/5 stars

Signaling in a four star review by Jesus Freak Hideout, Mark Rice recognizes, "A powerful and quality album all around, and with definite areas of improvement over an already-strong debut, this four-man group from South Dakota is firmly establishing themselves as a force in Christian metalcore." Brody B., indicating in a four star review from Indie Vision Music, realizing, "Colossus have improved in nearly every aspect since their Freshman release, 'Time & Eternal'."

== Track listing ==
No.	Title	Length
1.	"Badlands"	1:10
2.	"Demons'"	3:39
3.	"Slow Burn"	3:04
4.	"Outcast"	3:39
5.	"Worthless"	3:22
6.	"Shades of Gray"	2:44
7.	"Downcast Eyes"	4:01
8.	"Insomnia"	3:21
9.	"Recoil"	2:51
10.	"Nicotine"	3:36
Total length:		31:27

== Personnel ==
Adapted from AllMusic.

Colossus

- Alex Gutzmer – Vocals
- Jim Hughes – Engineer, Guitar, Backing Vocals
- Zach Moll – Artwork, Bass
- Israel Wipf – Drums

Additional musicians

- Jack Daniels (War of Ages, Hope for the Dying) – Guitar, Soloist
- Daniel McWhorter (Gideon) – Guest Vocals on track 4

Production

- Zach Alvey – Assistant Engineer
- Josh Barber – Engineer, Producer
- McKinney Botts – Assistant Engineer
- Cameron Brooks – Composer
- Brian Hood – Mastering, Mixing
- Dave Quiggle – Artwork
- Ben "Bob" Turkovic – Assistant Engineer

== Charts ==
Chart (2014)	Peak position
US Christian Albums (Billboard)	13
US Heatseekers Albums (Billboard)	9
US Independent Albums (Billboard)	39
