= Irreversible =

Irreversible may refer to:

- Irreversible process, in thermodynamics, a process that is not reversible
- Irréversible, 2002 French film

- Irréversible (soundtrack), soundtrack to the film Irréversible

- A 2007 album by Grieves
- A 2026 album by Brigitte Calls Me Baby
- A 2016 song by Erra from their 2016 album Drift
