= Cure (album) =

Studio album by Erra
- Released: April 5, 2024
- Recorded: 2023
- Genre: Progressive metalcore
- Length: 48:29
- Label: UNFD
- Producer: Daniel Braunstein

Erra chronology
Erra (2021)	Cure (2024)	Silence Outlives the Earth (2026)

Singles from Cure
- 1. "Pale Iris" Released: August 16, 2023; 2. "Cure" Released: February 1, 2024; 3. "Blue Reverie" Released: February 22, 2024; 4. "Crawl Backwards Out of Heaven" Released: March 14, 2024

Cure (stylized as [cure]) is the sixth studio album by American progressive metalcore band Erra. It was released on April 5, 2024, through UNFD and was produced by Daniel Braunstein. It is the first album to feature guitarist Clint Tustin.

== Background and promotion ==
In March 2023, the band played a headlining tour in Europe with bands Silent Planet, Invent Animate and Sentinels. Following their European headline tour, the band entered the studio with Dan Braunstein to record new material. The band would add Clint Tustin as the secondary guitarist to the band after touring with the band for a year. On August 16, the band released the first single "Pale Iris" and its corresponding music video.

On February 1, 2024, Erra announced the album itself and release date. At the same time, they released the title track and video for "Cure", whilst also revealing the album cover and the track list. On February 22, the band unveiled the third single "Blue Reverie" along with an accompanying music video. On March 14, one month before the album release, the band premiered the fourth single "Crawl Backwards Out of Heaven". A few weeks following the release the band will embark on North American headline tour with support from Make Them Suffer, Void of Vision, and Novelists followed by appearances at European and UK festivals such as Download Festival and Graspop.

== Critical reception ==
Professional ratings
Review scores
Source	Rating
Kerrang!	4/5 stars
Metal Hammer	4/5 stars
Wall of Sound	8/10

Cure received generally positive reviews from critics. Jake Richardson of Kerrang! considered the release to be "an album that showcases the sonic power of metalcore when the genre is executed with due care and craft. It's not quite a revolutionary work, but Cure is an undeniably strong addition to the metalcore canon." Writing for Metal Hammer, Dannii Leivers calls the album "...a natural continuation. [...] If there's any justice in the world, Cure should be the album that catapults them in front of a much larger audience." Wall of Sound gave the album a score 8/10 and saying: "Cure takes a stand and showcases why Erra are an unparalleled staple in the progressive metal genre, continuously amping up their game with explorative curiosity and sheer talent. This is not the end, but the dawn of a new Erra."

== Track listing ==
All tracks written by Daniel Braunstein and Jesse Cash; additional writers listed below. Credits adapted from Tidal.

Cure track listing
No.	Title	Writer(s)	Length
1.	"Cure"	Alex Ballew, Joseph Cavey	3:45
2.	"Rumor of Light"	Ballew, Cavey	4:02
3.	"Idle Wild"	Ballew, Cavey	4:12
4.	"Blue Reverie"	Ballew, Cavey	5:01
5.	"Slow Sour Bleed"	Ballew, Cavey	4:07
6.	"Wish"		1:25
7.	"Glimpse"	Ballew, Cavey	4:23
8.	"Past Life Persona"	Cavey	4:40
9.	"Crawl Backwards Out of Heaven"	Cavey	3:22
10.	"End to Excess"	Ballew, Cavey	4:11
11.	"Pale Iris"	Ballew, Cavey	4:23
12.	"Wave"	Ballew, Cavey	4:58
Total length:			48:29

== Personnel ==
Credits adapted from Tidal.

Erra

- J.T. Cavey – lead vocals
- Jesse Cash – guitar, clean vocals, bass (studio recording)
- Clint Tustin – guitar (credited, but does not play)
- Conor Hesse – bass (credited, but does not play)
- Alex Ballew – drums, percussion

Additional personnel

- Daniel Braunstein – production, engineering, mixing, mastering

== Charts ==
Chart performance for Cure
Chart (2024)	Peak position
Australian Albums (ARIA)	91
UK Album Downloads (Official Charts)	47
UK Independent Albums (Official Charts)	43
UK Rock & Metal Albums (Official Charts)	22
