= Moments of Clarity (EP) =

EP by Erra
- Released: November 10, 2014
- Genre: Progressive metalcore
- Length: 23:08
- Label: Sumerian
- Producer: Brian Hood

Erra chronology
Augment (2013)	Moments of Clarity (2014)	Drift (2016)

Singles from Moments of Clarity
- 1. "Dreamcatcher" Released: October 21, 2014

Moments of Clarity is the third EP by American progressive metalcore band Erra. It was released on November 10, 2014 through Sumerian Records and was produced by Brian Hood. It is their only release with vocalist Ian Eubanks, the first with Sean Price as a guitarist (after having played bass on Augment), and their first release to be published by Sumerian Records.

== Track listing ==
No.	Title	Length
1.	"Dreamcatcher"	4:59
2.	"Warrior"	3:55
3.	"Lights City"	4:57
4.	"Our Translucent Forever"	4:29
5.	"Moments of Clarity"	4:47
Total length:		23:08

== Personnel ==
Erra

- Ian Eubanks – lead vocals
- Jesse Cash – guitar, bass, vocals
- Sean Price – guitar, bass
- Alex Ballew – drums

Additional personnel

- Brian Hood – production, engineering

== Charts ==
Chart (2014)	Peak position
US Heatseekers Albums	4
US Hard Rock Albums	11
US Top Rock Albums	37
