= Volition (disambiguation) =

Volition is the process of making and acting on decisions.

Volition may also refer to:

- Volition (linguistics), a distinction to express whether the subject intended the action or not
- Volition (company), a defunct video game developer
- Volition Records, a record label
- Volition (Protest the Hero album), 2013
- Volition (As Hell Retreats album), 2011
- Volition (film), 2019 science fiction film
- Coherent Extrapolated Volition, hypothetical choices and the actions collectively taken with more knowledge and ability
