= When Lambs Become Lions =

Studio album by Nothing Til Blood
- Released: September 27, 2011
- Genre: Christian hardcore, Christian metal
- Length: 33:02
- Label: Strike First

Nothing Til Blood chronology
Bloodcry (2010)	When Lambs Become Lions (2011)	Still Standing (2014)

When Lambs Become Lions is the first studio album from Nothing Til Blood. Strike First Records released the album on September 27, 2011.

== Critical reception ==
Professional ratings
Review scores
Source	Rating
Christ Core	4/5 stars
Cross Rhythms	7/10 squares
HM Magazine	3/5 stars
Jesus Freak Hideout	3.5/5 stars
Mind Equals Blown	6.5/10
The New Review	2/5 stars

Awarding the album three stars from HM Magazine, Nick Cotrufo states, "The lyrics may be powerful, but the vocals are sloppy and hard to follow at points. The album has its repetitive moments, but for the most part it stays on track and keeps changing things up." Ian Webber, rating the album a seven out of ten for Cross Rhythms, writes, "Whilst not yet a finished package as their music is still a tad formulaic, this is one band worth looking out for in the future." Giving the album three and a half stars at Jesus Freak Hideout, Scott Fryberger describes, "Nothing Til Blood's overall sound doesn't stand out too much, but they've put their hearts into what they do have, and I have to respect that."

Jason Gardner, rating the album a 6.5 out of ten by Mind Equals Blown, writes, "When Lambs Become Lions is a solid first full-length for the group, showing a hint of promise among the moments of intrigue and interjection to keep this record from being completely lost in the sea of budding hardcore artists – religious, political or otherwise." Giving the album two stars for The New Review, Jonathan Anderson says, "When Lambs Become Lions is your run of the mill ten tracks, thirty minute album with an interlude and acoustic closing track ... The vocals are generally lackluster to me and come across as uninspired." Anthony Ibarra, awarding the album four stars at Christ Core, states, "this spirit-filled hardcore band has infused their metal and hardcore punk influences to take the current music scene by storm."

== Track listing ==
No.	Title	Length
1.	"Toe to Toe"	2:52
2.	"Entitled"	3:30
3.	"Tragedies"	3:01
4.	"Stands True"	3:46
5.	"Lambs"	2:51
6.	"Interlude"	1:37
7.	"Gabriel"	4:51
8.	"Lions"	3:28
9.	"Rise Up"	4:42
10.	"Depths of the Sea"	2:24
Total length:		33:02

== Credits ==
Nothing Til Blood

- Amadeus Pryor - Lead Vocals
- Travis Higginbotham - Guitar, Backing Vocals
- Cameron White - Guitar
- Matthew White - Bass
- William-Allen Johnson - Drums

Production

- Jamie King - Producer
- Dave Quiggle - Artwork
- Ryan Russell - Photography
