= Time & Eternal =

Studio album by Colossus
- Released: June 11, 2013
- Genre: Christian metal, metalcore
- Length: 31:39
- Label: Facedown
- Producer: Josh Barber

Colossus chronology
Time & Eternal (2013)	Badlands (2014)

Time & Eternal is the debut studio album by Christian metal band Colossus. Facedown Records released the album on June 11, 2013. Colossus worked with Josh Barber on the production of this album.

== Reception ==
Professional ratings
Review scores
Source	Rating
Cross Rhythms	8/10 squares
HM Magazine	4/5 stars
Indie Vision Music	3/5 stars
Jesus Freak Hideout	4.5/5 stars

Specifying in a four star review by HM Magazine, Anthony Bryant reveals, "Time and Eternal is overflowing with crisp drums and clean guitars; it is tight instrumentally. But it’s the lyrics that really set this release apart... If Time and Eternal is just the beginning, we could be looking at a long career for Colossus, with releases that continue to progress and impress." Graeme Crawford, indicating in an eight out of ten review from Cross Rhythms, recognizes, "Colossus in name, and colossal in nature in both lyrical and musical content. Deep, searching and intense lyrics combine with gigantic, thundering vocals and a soundtrack that could demolish buildings... Alex Gutzmer narrates with a passionate and brutal roar. It is quite a short album, with only 10 tracks and two of those combine for one minute 52 seconds, but this is an excellent start from the Sioux Falls-based band who display ability, passion and enough diversity to stand out from their labelmates." Signaling in a four and a half star review by Jesus Freak Hideout, Wayne Reimer replies, "Let me remind you one more time that this is Colossus' first album. Brilliance could be argued in the fact that they have written a near flawless album, yet left lots of room for improvement/progression. Time & Eternal isn't the most creative album ever written, but it is excellent." Lee Brown, writes in a three star review from Indie Vision Music, realizing, "Time and Eternal is a classical tale of sin and redemption, brokenness and restoration, death and life set to the backdrop of some very solid progressive heavy music. Though the album does not break new ground musically or thematically for the genre, it brings a polish and sheen far beyond a debut record. Colossus has built a mighty strong foundation from which to build a promising musical career upon."

== Track listing ==
No.	Title	Length
1.	"Time"	3:49
2.	"Superficial Saviour"	3:30
3.	"Counterfeit Kingdoms"	3:34
4.	"Dirge"	0:52
5.	"Bereavement"	3:59
6.	"Transgressor"	2:57
7.	"Pentecost"	0:59
8.	"Beacons"	2:59
9.	"Approaching the Throne"	4:16
10.	"Eternal"	4:44
Total length:		31:39
