= The Marriage of Heaven and Hell (album) =

Studio album by A Plea for Purging
- Released: July 6, 2010
- Genre: Metalcore
- Length: 39:35
- Label: Facedown
- Producer: Joey Sturgis

A Plea for Purging chronology
Depravity (2009)	The Marriage of Heaven and Hell (2010)	The Life & Death of A Plea for Purging (2011)

The Marriage of Heaven and Hell is the third release by American metalcore band A Plea for Purging. It was engineered and produced by Joey Sturgis and mixed and mastered by Brian Hood. This was the last album with guitarist Tyler Wilson.

== Track listing ==
No.	Title	Length
1.	"The Eternal Female"	3:31
2.	"Sick Silent America"	4:43
3.	"Shiver"	2:55
4.	"Golden Barriers"	3:37
5.	"The Fall"	3:45
6.	"And Weep" (featuring Nate Click)	3:45
7.	"Trembling Hands"	3:44
8.	"Finite"	4:13
9.	"The Jealous Wings"	4:16
10.	"The New Born Wonder"	5:01
Total length:		39:35

== Critical reception ==
The NewReview gave the album a perfect 5 out of 5 and states "Quite simply, this is a record steeped in heart-racing psychedelic, bleak melodies, and wound together by an aching atmosphere and captivating concept, which proves The Marriage of Heaven and Hell to be the group's most impressive outing yet."

Sound In The Signals Magazine also gave the album a positive review stating:

"Overall, I'd say this is a good release from a genre that has been bled dry with copycats and dull ideas. Not the most original album you'll hear this year, but a fine addition to your metal library if you like this kind of thing. It should fit well between Norma Jean's O God, the Aftermath and The Chariot Wars and Rumors of Wars."

Jesusfreakhideout.com gave the album 4 stars out of 5, praising the band's "more mature and complete sound"; also stating that "the [general] song structure is more chaotic and dissonant, which is exactly where this band should be musically". The review also noted the band's use of clean vocals in some of the tracks as a significant "surprising... new development".

== Personnel ==
A Plea for Purging

- Andy Atkins – vocals
- Blake Martin – lead guitar, clean vocals
- Tyler Wilson – rhythm guitar
- John Wand – bass
- Aaron Eckermann – drums, percussion

Production

- Produced by Joey Sturgis at The Foundation recording studio in Connersville, Indiana.
- Mixed and Mastered by Brian Hood at 456 Recordings
- Artwork by Dave Quiggle

Additional Musicians

- Nate Click on track 6
