= Drift (Erra album) =

Studio album by Erra
- Released: April 8, 2016
- Genre: Progressive metalcore
- Length: 45:13
- Label: Sumerian
- Producer: Nick Sampson

Erra chronology
| Moments of Clarity (2014) | Drift (2016) | Neon (2018) |

Singles from Drift
- 1. "Luminesce" Released: February 5, 2016; 2. "Drift" Released: February 16, 2016; 3. "Orchid" Released: March 24, 2016; 4. "Hourglass" Released: April 1, 2016

Drift is the third studio album by American progressive metalcore band Erra. It was released on April 8, 2016 through Sumerian Records and was produced by Nick Sampson. It is the band's first album with former Texas in July vocalist J.T. Cavey.

== Track listing ==
| No. | Title | Length |
|---|---|---|
| 1. | "Luminesce" | 3:23 |
| 2. | "Irreversible" | 4:23 |
| 3. | "Skyline" | 4:43 |
| 4. | "Hourglass" | 3:54 |
| 5. | "Orchid" | 4:22 |
| 6. | "Drift" | 4:33 |
| 7. | "Sleeper" | 3:18 |
| 8. | "Continuum" | 4:15 |
| 9. | "Safehaven" | 6:22 |
| 10. | "The Hypnotist" | 5:55 |
| Total length: | | 45:13 |

== Personnel ==
Credits retrieved from AllMusic.

Erra

- J.T. Cavey – unclean vocals, backing clean vocals
- Jesse Cash – guitar, bass, clean vocals
- Sean Price – guitar, bass
- Alex Ballew – drums

Additional musicians

- Ryan Arini – background vocals
- Janna and Travis Bobier – background vocals
- Mike Morris – background vocals
- Scott Solomon – background vocals

Additional personnel

- Nick Sampson – production, engineering, mastering, mixing, bass
- Ian Eubanks – composition
- Aaron Marsh – artwork
- Nick Walters – A&R
- Daniel McBride – layout

== Charts ==
| Chart (2016) | Peak position |
|---|---|
| Billboard 200 | 101 |
| US Heatseekers Albums | 1 |
| US Hard Rock Albums | 3 |
| US Top Rock Albums | 12 |
