= Conviction (The Crimson Armada album) =

Studio album by The Crimson Armada
- Released: June 21, 2011
- Recorded: 456 Recordings, Huntsville, Alabama
- Genre: Metalcore
- Length: 37:07
- Label: Artery
- Producer: Brian Hood

The Crimson Armada chronology
Guardians (2009)	Conviction (2011)	Ceremony (2025)

Professional ratings
Review scores
Source	Rating
Mind Equals Blown	5/10
Review Rinse Repeat	2/5 stars

Conviction is the second studio album by American heavy metal band The Crimson Armada. The album was released on June 21, 2011. It is the band's first (and only) release through Artery Recordings. It is also the band's only album to feature clean vocals, and the band's album to feature vocalist/guitarist Brandon McMaster. Conviction would be The Crimson Armada's final release prior to their breakup in 2012.

== Background ==
The Crimson Armada signed with Ricochet Management in July 2010, despite being dropped by Metal Blade Records. In early October 2010, the band posted a new track titled "Conviction" on its MySpace profile. In January 2011, the band signed a record deal with Artery Recordings, a joint venture between The Artery Foundation and Razor & Tie. On signing a new deal, vocalist Saud Ahmed stated "We are excited to finally have people behind us who believe in what we stand for and are ready to back us and help us become the band we are meant to be. We are happy to call Artery our home."

The band entered the studio with producer Brian Hood (A Plea for Purging, Hope for the Dying) to record their Artery debut. Hood would handle engineering, mastering, mixing, and production for the release.

In March, the band commented on the then-recent departures of guiarist Josh Jardim and drummer David Puckett. Sharing that they had recruited guitarist Brandon McMaster (Sleeping with Sirens) and drummer Jordan Matz (Like Moths to Flames) on drums as replacements. The band shared that Josh and David had departed earlier in the year on mutual terms after deciding that a career in full-time touring was not for them.

In April, the band embarked on a two week tour alongside Legacy and Legion.

In May 2011, the band made another track from the album, titled "Call to Arms," available for streaming. In promotion of the album, the band joined "The Nocturnal Alliance Tour" in the summer of 2011 alongside Impending Doom and MyChildren MyBride. The band premiered another track from the album "Composed of Stone" on June 7 through Noisecreep. The track features Andy Adkins of A Plea For Purging.

A music video was recorded for the track "Forgive Me." The band shared a teaser for the video in early September 2011. In response to the negative reaction the teaser video received, the band posted a statement clarifying that they were not a Christian band and never were. The video officially debuted exclusively through absolutepunk.net on September 30, 2011. On the video's subject matter, vocalist Saud Ahmed stated "It's one of those things that everyone can relate to where you see yourself with all of your friends and the great times we have together."

In late 2011, the band would tour alongside Vanna and The Chariot, but would be forced to drop off the tour due to a medical emergency. The band would also support Chelsea Grin on "The Sick Tour."

The album would be the Crimson Armada's final LP before breaking up in 2012.

== Track listing ==
No.	Title	Length
1.	"Conviction"	3:17
2.	"Juggernaut"	3:58
3.	"Forgive Me"	3:19
4.	"Composed of Stone" (featuring Andy Atkins of A Plea for Purging)	3:44
5.	"You've Changed"	4:15
6.	"Napalm" (featuring Levi Benton of Miss May I)	3:29
7.	"Questioning God"	3:33
8.	"Relief"	1:01
9.	"Call to Arms"	3:25
10.	"Soulcrusher"	2:01
11.	"Worthy"	5:05
Total length:		37:07

== Personnel ==
Credits for Conviction adapted from AllMusic.

The Crimson Armada

- Saud Ahmed – Lead vocals, keyboards, synthesizers, piano, programming, guitars
- Brandon McMaster – Lead guitar, clean vocals
- Dan Hatfield – Rhythm guitar
- Chris Yates – Bass
- Jordan Matz – Drums, percussion

Additional musicians

- Andy Atkins (A Plea for Purging) - Guest Vocals on track 4
- Levi Benton (Miss May I) - Guest Vocals on track 6

Production

- Produced by Brian Hood & Saud Ahmed
- Engineered, Mixed, Mastered & additional instruments by Brian Hood
- Composed by The Crimson Armada
- Management by Thomas Gutches (The Artery Foundation)
- A&R & layout by Mike Milford
