= Calloused =

Studio album by Gideon
- Released: October 14, 2014
- Genre: Metalcore, melodic hardcore
- Length: 31:36
- Label: Facedown
- Producer: Will Putney

Gideon chronology
Milestone (2012)	Calloused (2014)	Cold (2017)

Calloused is the third album by American metalcore band Gideon. Facedown Records released the project on October 14, 2014. Gideon worked with Will Putney on the production of this album.

== Reception ==
Professional ratings
Review scores
Source	Rating
AllMusic	3.5/5 stars
Cross Rhythms	8/10 squares
HM Magazine	3/5 stars
Indie Vision Music	3/5 stars
Jesus Freak Hideout	3/5 stars 4/5 stars

Signaling in a three-star review by HM Magazine, Collin Simula replies, "All in all, Calloused is a solid, enjoyable listen." Mark Deming, indicating in a three-and-a-half-star review from AllMusic, recognizes, "Gideon show off both their bone-snapping force and exacting precision on Calloused." Mentioning in an eight out of ten review at Cross Rhythms, Tony Cummings reports, "Facedown Records are still delivering the hardcore goods."

Specifying in a three-star review by Jesus Freak Hideout, Wayne Reimer retorts, "Musically, Gideon could have (and have) done better, but considering the target demographic and the wholesome lyrics, all their young fans may just want another big mouthful of knobs to chew on." Brody Barbour, representing a three star review from Indie Vision Music, realizes, "Gideon have created an album packed to the rafters with energy and passion in 'Calloused'."

== Track listing ==
No.	Title	Length
1.	"Calloused"	3:40
2.	"Savage"	2:46
3.	"Survive" (featuring Caleb Shomo of Beartooth)	3:29
4.	"Expose"	2:45
5.	"World of Hurt"	3:18
6.	"The Limit"	3:39
7.	"The Pulse"	2:30
8.	"Prison Eyes"	3:43
9.	"Momentum"	3:02
10.	"Drifter"	2:44
Total length:		31:36

== Personnel ==
Gideon

- Daniel McWhorter - vocals
- Daniel McCartney – lead guitar, vocals
- Tyler Riley - rhythm guitar, vocals
- Timothy Naugher – bass
- Jake Smelley – drums

Additional musicians

- Caleb Shomo - guest vocals on "Survive"

== Charts ==
Chart (2014)	Peak position
US Billboard 200	77
US Top Christian Albums (Billboard)	5
US Top Hard Rock Albums (Billboard)	4
US Independent Albums (Billboard)	15
US Top Rock Albums (Billboard)	21
