= Guardians (The Crimson Armada album) =

Studio album by The Crimson Armada
- Released: July 7, 2009
- Studios: The Foundation, Connersville, Indiana
- Genres: Metalcore, deathcore
- Length: 41:33
- Label: Metal Blade
- Producer: Joey Sturgis

The Crimson Armada chronology
Behold the Architect (2008)	Guardians (2009)	Conviction (2011)

Singles from Guardians
- 1. "The Serpent's Tongue" Released: September 17, 2009

Professional ratings
Review scores
Source	Rating
About.com	3/5 stars
AbsolutePunk	71%
AllMusic	3.5/5 stars
Indie Vision Music	4/5 stars
Jesusfreakhideout	4/5 stars

Guardians is the debut studio album by American metalcore band The Crimson Armada. The album was released on July 7, 2009. 5 of the tracks on this album were the re-recorded tracks from their previous 6-tracks release, Behold the Architect, which were "Desecrated," "The Final Words," "Revelations (featuring Travis Kempton)," "A Filthy Addiction" and "The Architect."

== Background ==
Metal Blade Records announced in August 2008 that they had signed The Crimson Armada to a record deal. They additionally shared that the band's debut-LP "Guardians" was tentatively scheduled for a spring release. On November 1, 2008, the band entered Foundation Studios to record their debut LP. Recording would be led by Joey Sturgis, who would also handle mixing and mastering.

In May 2009, the band posted the track "The Serpent's Tongue" to its MySpace profile. On June 7, 2009, the band shared a "making of" video, providing background on the music video the band was recording for "The Serpent's Tongue."

Following the release, lead guitarist Kyle Barrington and drummer David Puckett would depart the band in early 2011.

== Music videos ==
The Crimson Armada released a video for the song "The Serpents Tongue," produced by Thunder Down. The video begins with the band playing inside a home then going to a woman sorting photos. Meanwhile, a member of the 82nd Airborne wanders in Normandy during WWII, he is ambushed by German soldiers and shot. After a few more scenes of the band, the man begins to read a letter, he then dies. At that time the woman then begins to sprout angel wings. She then appears with the soldier in Normandy. She touches him and his eyes open again as she smiles. The video ends with her putting his photo (which used to have the eyes covered) down into a pile with other photos.

== Track listing ==
No.	Title	Length
1.	"Guardians"	5:36
2.	"A Filthy Addiction"	4:59
3.	"The Sound, the Flood, the Hour"	4:30
4.	"In the Eyes of God"	4:15
5.	"The Serpent's Tongue"	4:20
6.	"Revelations" (featuring Mattie Montgomery of For Today)	2:44
7.	"Desecrated"	4:03
8.	"The Final Words" (featuring Joey Sturgis)	5:07
9.	"The Architect"	5:24
10.	"Outro"	0:35
Total length:		41:33

== Personnel ==
The Crimson Armada

- Saud Ahmed – lead vocals, keyboards, synthesizers, piano, programming
- Kyle Barrington – lead guitar
- Dan Hatfield – rhythm guitar
- Chris Yates – bass guitar
- David Puckett – drums

Additional personnel

- Mattie Montgomery – additional vocals on track 6
- Joey Sturgis – production, additional programming, sound effects, additional vocals on track 8
- McBride Design – artwork
