= Depravity (album) =

Studio album by A Plea for Purging
- Released: March 3, 2009
- Recorded: November 29 – December 20, 2008
- Studio: The Foundation Recording Studios, Connersville, Indiana
- Genre: Metalcore, Christian death metal
- Length: 42:50
- Label: Facedown
- Producer: Joey Sturgis

A Plea for Purging chronology
A Critique of Mind and Thought (2007)	Depravity (2009)	The Marriage of Heaven and Hell (2010)

Professional ratings
Review scores
Source	Rating
ThrashMagazine	9.5/10 stars
NotPopular.com	9/10 stars
Jesus Freak Hideout	3/5 stars

Depravity is the second studio album by metalcore band A Plea for Purging. It was released on hardcore and metal label, Facedown Records and was produced by Joey Sturgis (The Devil Wears Prada, Attack Attack!). The album received generally positive reviews.

== Track listing ==
All tracks by A Plea for Purging

1. "Descension" - 0:27
2. "Retribution" - 3:37
3. "Malevolence - 4:00
4. "Holocausts" - 3:48
5. "Motives" - 3:23
6. "Devourer" - 4:29
7. "Prevaricator" - 4:27
8. "Traitor" - 4:12
9. "Misanthropy" (featuring guest vocals by Devin Leach of Alert The Sky) - 3:18
10. "Reputation" - 4:35
11. "Depravity" - 6:34

B-sides

1. "Live Your Life" - 4:53 cover of "Live Your Life" by T.I. feat. Rihanna)

== Personnel ==
A Plea for Purging

- Andy Atkins - vocals
- Blake Martin - lead guitar, clean vocals on "Reputation"
- Tyler Wilson - rhythm guitar
- John Wand - bass
- Aaron Eckermann - drums

Guest musicians

- Devin Leach (ex-Alert the Sky) - vocals on "Misanthropy"

Production

- Produced, Mixed, Mastered, Additional vocals and programming by Joey Sturgis
- Engineered by Joey Sturgis and Andy Walker
- Layout design by Dave Quiggle
- Photography by Taylor Foiles
