= Erra (album) =

Studio album by Erra
- Released: March 19, 2021
- Genre: Progressive metalcore
- Length: 53:27
- Label: UNFD
- Producers: Carson Slovak; Grant McFarland

Erra chronology
Neon (2018)	Erra (2021)	Cure (2024)

Singles from Erra
- 1. "Snowblood" Released: August 27, 2020; 2. "House of Glass" Released: November 19, 2020; 3. "Divisionary" Released: January 13, 2021; 4. "Scorpion Hymn" Released: February 3, 2021; 5. "Shadow Autonomous" Released: March 11, 2021; 6. "Vanish Canvas" Released: October 7, 2021; 7. "Nigh to Silence" Released: January 21, 2022; 8. "Stockholm Syndrome" Released: February 23, 2022

Deluxe edition cover
- Artwork used for the deluxe edition cover.

Erra (stylized in all caps) is the fifth studio album by American progressive metalcore band Erra. It was released on March 19, 2021, through UNFD. The album was produced by Carson Slovak and Grant McFarland. It is the band's first studio release with the label and the last album to feature guitarist Sean Price before he left the band in March 2022.

== Background and promotion ==
On August 27, 2020, the band announced that they had parted ways with Sumerian Records and signed with UNFD, and they released a new single "Snowblood" along with a corresponding music video. On November 19, the band released another single "House of Glass".

On January 13, 2021, the band released the third single "Divisionary" along with an accompanying music video. At the same time, the band officially announced the album itself, the album cover, the track list, and release date. On February 3, one and a half months before the album's release, the band unveiled the fourth single, "Scorpion Hymn". On March 11, the band released the fifth single, "Shadow Autonomous". On September 10, just under six months after the album's original release, the band released an instrumental version of the album.

On October 7, the band unveiled a new version of the song "Vanish Canvas" featuring Courtney LaPlante of Spiritbox along with its music video. On January 21, 2022, the band released the seventh single "Nigh to Silence" while also announcing the deluxe edition of the album which is set to be released on March 18. At the same time, the band officially revealed the album cover and the track list. On February 23, one month before the release, the band released their cover of Muse's "Stockholm Syndrome" on streaming music services.

== Critical reception ==
Professional ratings
Review scores
Source	Rating
Distorted Sound	8/10
Metal Injection	8.5/10
New Noise	4/5 stars
Rock 'n' Load	10/10
Wall of Sound	9/10

Erra received generally positive reviews from critics. Distorted Sound scored the album 8 out of 10 and said: "Undeniably the most pivotal moment of their metalcore span so far – ERRA have delivered the goods when it mattered most. Laser focused on highlighting their pros, this self titled-record makes its incredible production job pay dividends. It's modern metalcore as you know it, but just done really, really well." Metal Injection rated the album 8.5 out of 10 and stated, "Defined by polished experimentation and a breathtaking balance between melody and heaviness, we witness Erra reaching for and finally fully grasping greatness on this self-titled." New Noise gave the album 4 out of 5 and stated: "ERRA is a mesmerizing distillation of ERRA's thirteen-year career, one that boldly refracts and refines the group's sound for the uncertain future ahead."

Rock 'N' Load praised the album saying, "ERRA is, in short, phenomenal. Every single instrument works in perfect unison to create these massive soundscapes that fit effortlessly around the crushing walls of aggressive sound Erra have mastered the creation of. From the opening notes to the closing seconds, I found myself completely absorbed within the evolved sound that Erra has crafted and can recommend this release to metal fans without a single second thought." Wall of Sound gave the album almost a perfect score 9/10 and saying: "Honestly, this album is a HUGE development from their last. It is unpredictable, memorable and precisely executed in every aspect. I think they'll find a lot of their older original fans returning with this album and a huge number of new fans as well. Strong, driving, technical metalcore riffs and melodic undertones are ERRA's bread and butter, but this album really takes all of that to another level."

The album was elected by Loudwire as the 14th best rock/metal album of 2021.

== Track listing ==
All songs written by Alexander Ballew, Jesse Cash and Joseph Cavey. Credits adapted from Tidal.

Erra track listing
No.	Title	Length
1.	"Snowblood"	4:13
2.	"Gungrave"	4:00
3.	"Divisionary"	3:41
4.	"House of Glass"	4:20
5.	"Shadow Autonomous"	5:17
6.	"Electric Twilight"	4:25
7.	"Scorpion Hymn"	3:50
8.	"Lunar Halo"	5:51
9.	"Vanish Canvas"	4:46
10.	"Eidolon"	4:37
11.	"Remnant"	4:20
12.	"Memory Fiction"	4:07
Total length:		53:27

Deluxe edition bonus tracks
No.	Title	Length
13.	"Sol Absentia"	4:03
14.	"Psalm of Sedition"	4:02
15.	"Nigh to Silence"	5:04
16.	"Vanish Canvas" (new version; featuring Courtney LaPlante of Spiritbox)	4:46
17.	"Stockholm Syndrome" (Muse cover)	5:21
18.	"Light My Way" (Audioslave cover)	5:28
19.	"Heresy" (Nine Inch Nails cover)	4:32
Total length:		86:43

== Personnel ==
Erra

- J.T. Cavey – lead vocals
- Jesse Cash – guitar, clean vocals
- Sean Price – guitar, backing vocals
- Conor Hesse – bass, backing vocals
- Alex Ballew – drums, backing vocals

Additional personnel

- Carson Slovak – production, mixing, mastering, recording
- Grant McFarland – production, mixing, mastering, recording
- Josh Johnson – assistant engineering
- Jeff Kardos – artwork, design

== Charts ==
Chart performance for Erra
Chart (2021)	Peak position
Australian Albums (ARIA)	52
US Hard Rock Albums (Billboard)	20
US Heatseekers Albums (Billboard)	4
