= A Plea for Purging =

American Christian metalcore band

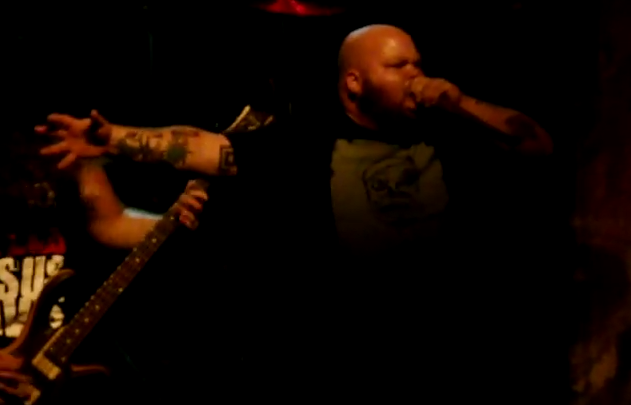
- A Plea for Purging at Scream the Prayer Tour 2011

Background information
- Also known as: Silas
- Origin: Nashville, Tennessee, U.S.
- Genres: Metalcore, Christian metal
- Years active: 2005–2012, 2017, 2023–present
- Labels: Facedown; El Shaddai (Australia)
- Past members: Andy "Dozer" Atkins; Ryan Blake Martin; John Wand; Aaron Eckermann; Lyle Paschal; Tyler Wilson; Justin Lewis

A Plea for Purging is an American Christian metalcore band based out of Nashville, Tennessee. During their time active, they released four full-length albums on Facedown Records and two EPs. Their final release, The Life & Death of A Plea for Purging, reached No. 24 on the US Billboard Rock Albums chart and No. 11 on the Heatseekers chart. Guitarist Blake Martin played on Project 86's record, Wait for the Siren and was a touring member for Haste the Day. Drummer Aaron Eckermann was a touring musician for Corpus Christi. Vocalist Andy Atkins was featured on The Crimson Armada's song "Composed of Stone", from their album Conviction.

== History ==
In 2005, Blake Martin (lead guitar) and John Wand (bass) recruited Justin Lewis (vocals), Aaron Eckermann (drums), and Lyle Paschal (rhythm guitar) to join their band, which they had originally called Silas. They later changed it to A Plea for Purging. The band recorded a self-titled EP with this line up, and soon after Justin Lewis quit the band.

The band then asked Andy Atkins to join the band. The band recorded an EP before signing to Facedown Records. Their Facedown debut was A Critique of Mind and Thought, with this line up, before guitarist Lyle Paschal quit.

In 2008, the band then recruited guitarist Tyler Wilson, and recorded the albums, Depravity and The Marriage of Heaven and Hell. In 2010, Wilson left, and the band continued on as a quartet. They played on the Haste the Day final tour, along with MyChildren MyBride and The Chariot.

The band announced they would disband in 2012, and recorded The Life & Death of A Plea for Purging.

The Quit Your Band and Get A Job Tour alongside As Hell Retreats took place from August 10 to September 8, 2012, culminating with a final show in A Plea for Purging's hometown of Nashville, Tennessee. This was the last for both A Plea for Purging and As Hell Retreats, with both bands disbanding following the tour. The band reunited for a one-time show at Facedown Fest 2017.

On January 4, 2023, the band announced they would reunite for a second time to play at Furnace Fest in September 2023.

== Band members ==
Current members

- Amos Andrew "Andy" Atkins – unclean vocals (2006–2012, 2017, 2023–present)
- Blake Martin – lead guitar, clean vocals (2005–2012, 2017, 2023–present)
- John Wand – bass (2005–2012, 2017, 2023–present)
- Aaron Eckermann – drums (2005–2012, 2017, 2023–present)

Former members

- Justin Lewis – vocals (2005–2006)
- Lyle Paschal – rhythm guitar (2005–2008)
- Tyler Wilson – rhythm guitar (2008–2010)

Timeline

== Discography ==
EPs

- A Plea for Purging (2006)
- Quick Is the Word; Steady is the Action (2007)
- Heart of a Child/Fat Pride (7-inch) (2011)

Studio albums

Year	Title	Label	Chart peaks		
Year	Title	Label	US Hard Rock	Independent	Heatseekers
2007	A Critique of Mind and Thought	Facedown Records	—	—	—
2009	Depravity	Facedown Records	—	—	24
2010	The Marriage of Heaven and Hell	Facedown Records	21	40	7
2011	The Life & Death of A Plea for Purging	Facedown Records	24	—	11

Videography

- "Malevolence" (Depravity)
- "Shiver" (The Marriage of Heaven and Hell)
- "The Eternal Female" (The Marriage of Heaven and Hell)
- "Heart of a Child" (The Life & Death of A Plea for Purging)
- "The Life" (The Life & Death of A Plea for Purging)
