= Costs (album) =

Studio album by Gideon
- Released: March 1, 2011
- Genres: Metalcore, hardcore punk
- Length: 28:19
- Label: Strike First
- Producer: Brian Hood

Gideon chronology
Costs (2011)	Milestone (2012)

Costs is the first studio album by American metalcore band Gideon. Facedown Records released the album on March 1, 2011. Gideon worked with Brian Hood, in the production of this album.

== Critical reception ==
Professional ratings
Review scores
Source	Rating
Cross Rhythms	8/10 squares
HM Magazine	3/5 stars
Indie Vision Music	4/5 stars
Jesus Freak Hideout	4/5 stars
Mind Equals Blown	6.5/10
The New Review	4.5/5 stars

Awarding the album three stars from HM Magazine, Rob Shameless states, "Costs is one of those records every nu hardcore kid is going to jock." Graeme Crawford, rating the album an eight out of ten for Cross Rhythms, writes, "In the future Gideon may look to give a little more variety in the song structures, however, their uncompromising stance is what gives them the impact that they have." Giving the album four stars at Jesus Freak Hideout, Timothy Estabrooks describes, "It's a blessedly simple, fists-in-the-air, headbang-worthy hardcore album that will definitely satisfy any fans of the genre. And there's no need to be pretentious about it."

Luke Amos, awarding the album four and a half stars by The New Review, writes, "Costs is a great addition to anyone's collection but especially those that enjoy a good musical thrashing along with some positive lyrics." Giving the album four stars from Indie Vision Music, BMer states, "The tightness of the music matched with the well-placed intense vocals really mesh well, adding with the occasional gang-vocals or clean vocals keeps Costs from being just another hardcore album." Sebastian Fonseca, rating the album a 6.5 out of ten for Mind Equals Blown, says, "Costs is an album that should not be disregarded by fans of the genre."

== Track listing ==
All tracks are written by Gideon and they are joined on track Nos. 4, 6, and 8 by Scooter Lee

No.	Title	Length
1.	"Costs"	1:20
2.	"Unworthy"	3:20
3.	"False Profits"	2:52
4.	"Gutcheck"	4:10
5.	"Foundation"	3:01
6.	"Brave New World"	3:34
7.	"Virtue"	3:15
8.	"Kingdom Minded"	3:58
9.	"Dreams"	2:49
Total length:		28:19

== Personnel ==
Gideon

- Daniel McWhorter – vocals
- Daniel McCartney – lead guitar, vocals
- Blake Hardman – rhythm guitar
- Timothy Naugher – bass
- Jake Smelley – drums
