= Nothing Til Blood =

American Christian hardcore/metal band

- Also known as: Aim for the Day
- Origin: Birmingham, Alabama
- Genres: Christian hardcore, Christian metal
- Years active: 2010–present
- Label: Strike First
- Members: Hector Becarra; Travis Higginbotham; Cameron White; Matthew White; William Allen-Johnson
- Past members: Amadeus Pryor
- Website: facebook.com/nothingtilblood

Nothing Til Blood, formerly known as Aim for the Day, is an American Christian hardcore and Christian metal band from Birmingham, Alabama. The band started making music in 2010, and their members at the time were lead vocalist, Amadeus Pryor, background vocalist and guitarist, Travis Higginbotham, guitarist, Cameron White, bassist, Matthew White, and drummer, William-Allen Johnson. They released one independently made album, Bloodcry, while they were Aim for the Day. The band released their first studio album, When Lambs Become Lions, in 2011 with Strike First Records. Their lead vocalist changed to Hector Becarra, at this juncture of leaving Strike First Records. They went independent, releasing another studio album, Still Standing, in 2014.

== Background ==
Nothing Til Blood, formerly Aim for the Day, is a Christian hardcore and Christian metal band from Birmingham, Alabama. Their members at its inception were lead vocalist, Amadeus Pryor, background vocalist and guitarist, Travis Higginbotham, guitarist, Cameron White, bassist, Matthew White, and drummer, William-Allen Johnson. Amadeus Pryor left the group after their first studio album was released, and they picked up a new front man and lead vocalist, Hector Becarra.

== Music history ==
The band commenced as a musical entity in 2010, with their first release, Bloodcry, that was released by independently, while they were, Aim for the Day. Their first studio album, When Lambs Become Lions, was released by Strike First Records on September 27, 2011. The subsequent album, Still Standing, was released on February 18, 2014.

== Members ==
Current members

- Hector Becarra - lead vocals (2012–present)
- Travis Higginbotham - background vocals, guitar (2010–present; Gideon)
- Cameron White - guitar (2010–present)
- Matthew White - bass (2010–present)
- William-Allen Johnson - drums (2010–present)

Former members

- Amadeus Pryor – lead vocals (2010-2012)

== Discography ==
Albums

- Bloodcry (2010, Independent), As Aim for the Day
- When Lambs Become Lions (September 27, 2011, Strike First)
- Still Standing (February 18, 2014, Independent)

EPs

- Ego Death + Rebirth (May 25, 2016, Independent)
