= Revival (As Hell Retreats album) =

Studio album by As Hell Retreats
- Released: May 25, 2010
- Genre: Christian metal, thrash metal, deathcore
- Length: 27:04
- Label: Strike First

As Hell Retreats chronology
| Acknowledgement (2008) | Revival (2010) | Volition (2011) |

Revival is the first studio album from As Hell Retreats. Strike First Records released the album on May 25, 2010.

== Critical reception ==
Professional ratings
Review scores
| Source | Rating |
|---|---|
| Christian Music Zine | B− |
| Cross Rhythms | 8/10 squares |
| Indie Vision Music | 4/5 stars |
| Jesus Freak Hideout | 3/5 stars 3.5/5 stars |

Awarding the album three stars from Jesus Freak Hideout, Wayne Reimer states, "Revival is a superbly written, face-breaking, volume-cranking monster, but the sound mix is less than professional and the band performance could use some improvement". Scott Fryberger, giving the album three and a half stars for Jesus Freak Hideout, writes, "Revival is a good debut, though. It's not amazing, but it has its moments of good instrumentation, making As Hell Retreats a band to check out for any hardcore fans". Rating the album an eight out of ten at Cross Rhythms, Andy Shaw says, "The production on the album is excellent with thunderously heavy bass really adding to the richness of the sound. I would have to say that it is all over rather too quickly though." Tyler Hess, giving the album a B− for Christian Music Zine, states, "As Hell Retreat's debut is not only a good album for any metalhead, but it's the great start for a band with a bright future ahead of them." Awarding the album four stars from Indie Vision Music, Steve writes, "As Hell Retreats is not lacking in talent and passion, which makes this album a must buy for any death metal or metal fan. If you like brutal breakdowns and great screaming, then this is the album for you."

== Track listing ==
All tracks are written by As Hell Retreats

| No. | Title | Length |
|---|---|---|
| 1. | "Intro" | 1:35 |
| 2. | "Inferior" | 3:03 |
| 3. | "The Holy Thief" | 2:55 |
| 4. | "Raze" | 3:55 |
| 5. | "Resting with Closed Eyes" | 3:06 |
| 6. | "Messengers" | 2:56 |
| 7. | "Contradiction" | 2:50 |
| 8. | "Revival" | 2:55 |
| 9. | "Poor God" | 3:49 |
| Total length: | | 27:04 |
