= My Ransomed Soul =

US musical group

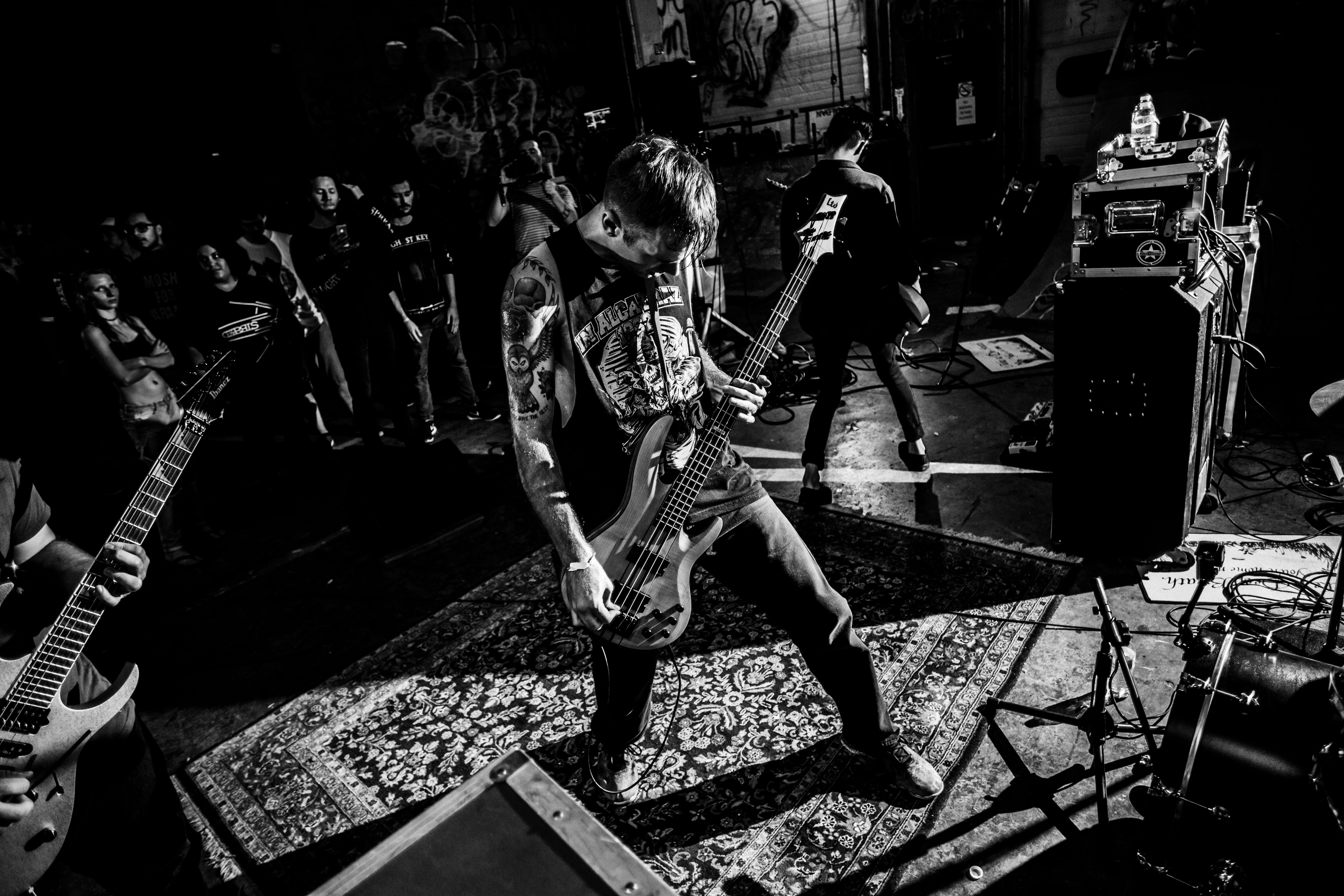

Background information
- Origin: Baltimore, Maryland
- Genres: Metalcore
- Years active: 2007–2017
- Labels: Red Cord Records
- Members: Brendan Frey; Garrison Frey; Hector Fernandez; Andrew Markle; Fredy Menjivar
- Past members: Daniel Proffitt; Daniel Busche; Jon Brentlinger; Kenny Patrick; Taylor Beard; Michael Mannarino; Tyler Scully; Oz Wittenbach; Mickey Basil; Jesse White; Jonathan Shonk
- Website: myransomedsoul.bandcamp.com

My Ransomed Soul was an American metalcore band from Maryland. Formed in 2007, the band's final lineup consisted of Brendan Frey (vocals), Garrison Frey (guitar), Hector Fernandez (guitar), Andrew Markle (Bass), and Fredy Menjivar (drums). The group released three full-length albums: The Chains That Bind Us (2012), Falsehoods (2013), and Trilateral (2015) as well as three EPs.

== History ==
The band was formed by vocalist Brendan Frey, guitarist Garrison Frey, and drummer Daniel Proffitt in 2007. The band's first release, My Ransomed Soul, was an extended play, that was released independently in 2009, while they released another extended play independently, Hourglass, in 2010, and their third independent extended play, Perceptions, in 2011. The band released an independently made album, The Chains That Bind Us, on May 8, 2012. The band's second studio album, Falsehoods, was released by Red Cord Records on March 26, 2013. The subsequent studio album, Trilateral, was released independently on February 24, 2015. In February 2017, the band announced that they would be disbanding to pursue a new project now known as Hostile Array.

== Members ==
Final members

- Brendan Frey – vocals (2007-2017); bass (2007-2008)
- Garrison Frey – guitar (2007-2017)
- Hector Fernandez – guitar (2014-2017)
- Andrew Markle – bass (2015-2017)
- Fredy Menjivar – drums (2014-2017)

Past members

- Daniel Busche – drums (2013-2014)
- Mickey Basil – bass (2013–2014)
- Michael Mannarino – guitar (2012-2013)
- Taylor Beard – bass (2011-2013)
- Jesse White – drums (2012)
- Daniel Proffit – drums (2007-2012)
- Kenny Patrick – guitar, bass (2009-2011)
- Oz Wittenbach – bass (2010)
- Jon Brentlinger – keyboards (2009)
- Jonathan Shonk – bass (2008)
- Tyler Scully – keyboards (2008)

Touring members

- Devon Scott - guitar, bass, drums (2013, 2014)
- Carlos Rivas – bass (2014)
- Daniel Macon – drums (2014)
- Austin Reed - guitar, bass (2010, 2011)
- Jake Drnec – bass (2007)

Timeline

== Discography ==
Studio albums

- The Chains That Bind Us (May 8, 2012, Independent)
- Falsehoods (March 26, 2013, Red Cord Records)
- Trilateral (February 24, 2015, Independent)

EPs

- My Ransomed Soul (2009, Independent)
- Hourglass (2010, Independent)
- Perceptions (2011, Independent)
