= The Crimson Armada =

American metalcore band

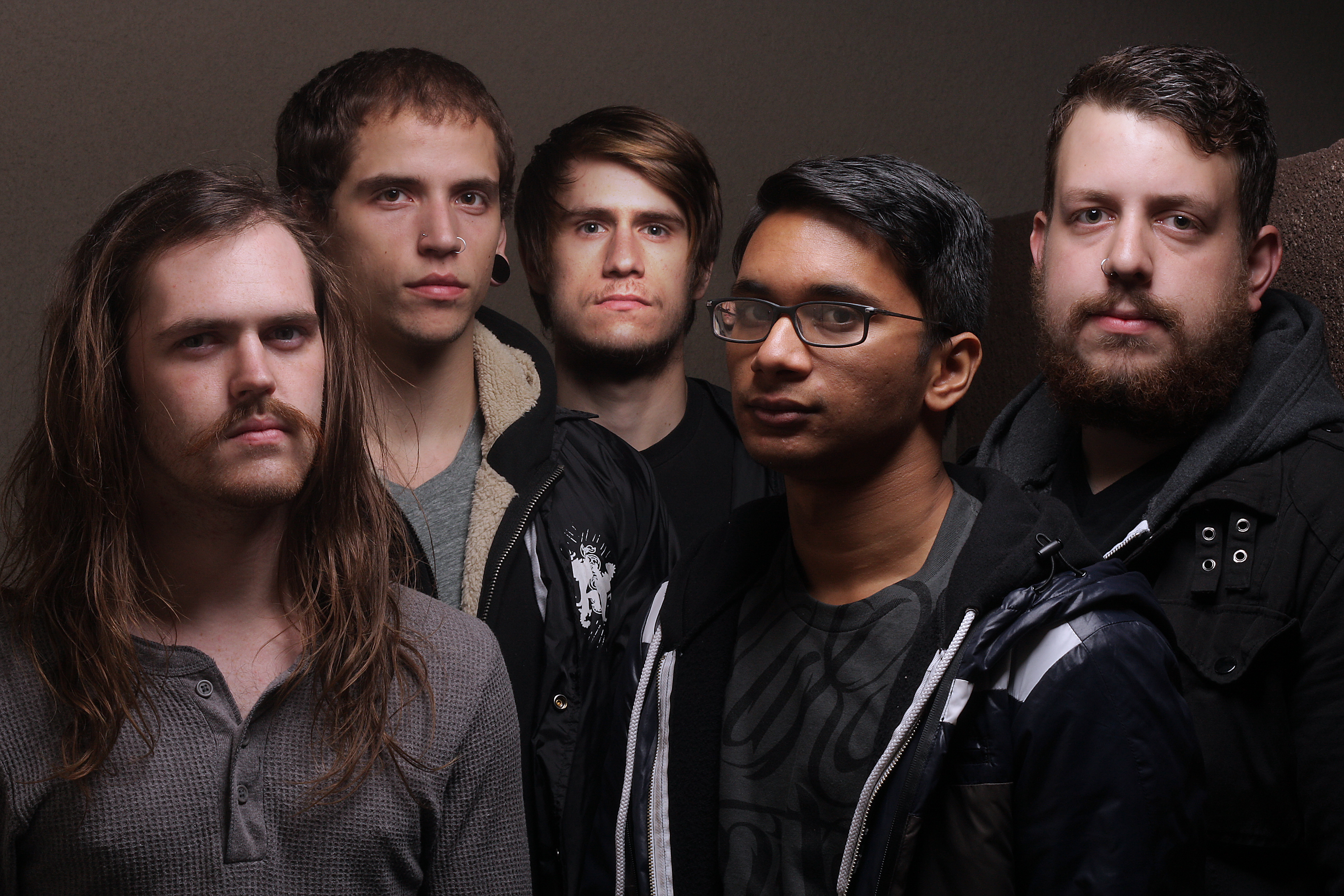
- The Crimson Armada in 2010

Background information
- Origin: Westerville, Ohio, U.S.
- Genres: Metalcore; deathcore
- Years active: 2007–2012, 2025–present
- Labels: Artery, Metal Blade
- Members: Saud Ahmed; Michael Newman; Stefan Orozco; Jaxson Tackett; Jonah Young
- Past members: Chris Yates; Kyle Barrington; David Puckett; Brandon McMaster; Dan Hatfield; Jordan Matz

The Crimson Armada is an American metalcore/deathcore band that Kyle Barrington and David Puckett formed in Westerville, Ohio in 2007. They are currently based in Columbus, Ohio.

== History ==
=== 2007–2010: Formation and Guardians ===
Following a one-year hiatus in 2008, the band returned to increased popularity, releasing its first EP, Behold the Architect. Following the release of Behold the Architect, the Crimson Armada signed a deal with Metal Blade Records. In July 2009, the band released its debut album, Guardians. Following the album's release, the band went on several tours with acts such as the Chariot, and MyChildren MyBride. In mid-2010, the group headed out on the Scream the Prayer Tour.

=== 2011–2012: Conviction and break-up ===
In January 2011, Crimson Armada signed a deal with Artery Recordings, and announced Conviction, released June 21, 2011. Conviction contained guest vocals by Andy Adkins of A Plea for Purging and Levi Benton of Miss May I. That April, the band performed at the 13th annual New England Metal and Hardcore Festival. In February 2012, Brandon McMaster left the band and Cye Marshall replaced him. On October 29, 2012, the band announced that they would disband due to their lead vocalist, Saud Ahmed, leaving the band.

=== 2024–present: Reunion ===
In June 2024, on the 15th anniversary of their debut album Guardians, it was announced that Metal Blade Records had licensed rights to Deathly Decibels Records to press Guardians on vinyl with both the original cover art and a limited edition alternative cover. Pre-orders went live on June 14th, 2024 and sold out in over one hour. Due to popular demand, Deathly Decibels Records announced on June 22, 2024 that Metal Blade "happily obliged" to a second run vinyl pressing of Guardians. The second run went live for pre-orders on June 24, 2024.

On October 16, 2024, the band released a new track, "Ancient Call", with Saud Ahmed returning on vocals. On November 26, the band released another new song, "Revelations II". The band released a third new track, "Man and Beast", in January 2025. The song features Joey Sturgis on guest vocals.

On February 6th, 2025, the band self-released the five-song EP Ceremony. On June 7, 2025, The Crimson Armada played a reunion show at Ace of Cups in Columbus, Ohio. They were supported by local hardcore and metalcore acts Price 2 Pay, Goroh, Samarrah, and Former.

== Band members ==
Current members

- Saud Ahmed – lead vocals, studio instruments (2008–present)
- Michael Newman – lead guitar (2025–present)
- Stefan Orozco – rhythm guitar, backing vocals (2025–present)
- Jaxson Tackett – drums (2025–present)
- Jonah Young - bass (2026-present)

Former members

- Chris Yates – bass (2008–2010, 2025)
- Kyle Barrington – lead guitar (2007–2009)
- David Puckett – drums (2007–2011)
- Brandon McMaster – guitar, clean vocals (2010–2012)
- Dan Hatfield – guitar(2007–2012)
- Jordan Matz – drums (2011–2012)

== Discography ==
Studio albums

- Guardians (Metal Blade Records, 2009)
- Conviction (Artery Recordings, 2011)

EPs

- Behold the Architect (self-released, 2008)
- Demo 2010 (self-released, 2010)
- Ceremony (self-released, 2025)

== Videography ==
- "The Serpent's Tongue"
- "Forgive Me"
