= Volition (As Hell Retreats album) =

Studio album by As Hell Retreats
- Released: July 26, 2011
- Genre: Christian metal, thrash metal, deathcore
- Length: 39:12
- Label: Ain't No Grave Records
- Producer: Brian Hood

As Hell Retreats chronology
Revival (2010)	Volition (2011)

Volition is the second studio album from As Hell Retreats. Ain't No Grave Records released the album on July 26, 2011. As Hell Retreats worked with Brian Hood, in the production of this album.

== Critical reception ==
Professional ratings
Review scores
Source	Rating
HM Magazine	2/5 stars
Jesus Freak Hideout	4/5 stars
The New Review	4.5/5 stars

Rating the album two stars from HM Magazine, Matthew Leonard says, "it's a weak attempt at the hardcore/metalcore genre." Scott Fryberger, awarding the album four stars for Jesus Freak Hideout, writes, "Volition isn't a huge step up from Revival, soundwise, but I do think As Hell Retreats has surpassed it in general quality." Giving the album four and a half stars at The New Review, Josh Velliquette states, "Volition is not a joyous listening experience. Volition is a musically varied album that stretches straight for the heart, praising and damning the privilege of decision making."

== Track listing ==
All tracks are written by Jackson Greene, As Hell Retreats

No.	Title	Length
1.	"Young Heretic"	3:14
2.	"The Loss"	0:55
3.	"Matriarch"	3:38
4.	"Shun"	3:11
5.	"Heaven's Bane"	3:20
6.	"Misanthropist"	3:34
7.	"A Beggar..."	2:45
8.	"...And His Faith"	3:11
9.	"Transgress"	3:38
10.	"Desperation"	3:07
11.	"Creator(s)"	2:10
12.	"Only Hope"	6:29
Total length:		39:12
