= Colossus (band) =

American Christian metal band

- Origin: Sioux Falls, South Dakota
- Genres: Christian metal, metalcore, progressive metal
- Years active: 2010–2014
- Label: Facedown
- Members: Alex Gutzmer; Jim Hughes; Zach Moll; Israel Wipf

Colossus was an American Christian metal band from Sioux Falls, South Dakota. The band started making music in 2010. Facedown Records signed the band. Time & Eternal is the first work by Colossus. Their second work is Badlands.

== Background ==
The band derives their name from the X-Men, Colossus.

== Members ==
Current

- Alex Gutzmer: lead vocals (2010–present)
- Jim Hughes: guitar, backing vocals (2010–present)
- Zach Moll: bass (2010–present)
- Israel Wipf: drums (2010–present)

Former

- Cameron Brooks: guitar (2010–2013)

== Discography ==
Studio albums

List of studio albums, with selected chart positions
Title	Details	Peak chart positions		
Title	Details	US Christ	US Heat	US Indie
Time & Eternal	Released: June 11, 2013; Label: Facedown Records; Format: CD, digital download	—	—	—
Badlands	Released: September 16, 2014; Label: Facedown Records; Format: CD, digital download	13	9	39

Singles

- "In the End", originally performed by Linkin Park, released on Goes Undercover compilation (2013)
