= Milestone (Gideon album) =

Studio album by Gideon
- Released: July 3, 2012
- Genres: Metalcore, hardcore punk, Christian hardcore
- Length: 33:10
- Label: Facedown
- Producer: Brian Hood

Gideon chronology
| Costs (2011) | Milestone (2012) | Calloused (2014) |

Milestone is the second studio album by American metalcore band Gideon. Facedown Records released the album on July 3, 2012. Gideon worked with Brian Hood in the production of this album.

== Critical reception ==
Professional ratings
Review scores
| Source | Rating |
|---|---|
| The Christian Music Review Blog | 8/10 |
| Cross Rhythms | 8/10 squares |
| HM Magazine | 3/5 stars |
| Indie Vision Music | 5/5 stars |
| Jesus Freak Hideout | 4/5 stars |
| Mind Equals Blown | 7/10 |

Awarding this album three stars from HM Magazine, Tim Hallila states, "A refreshingly tight sound". Gareth Hills, rating the album an eight out of ten for Cross Rhythms, writes, "an album which doesn't give up in its passion, energy and rawness, and an example of a Christian metal band doing it right." Giving the album four stars at Jesus Freak Hideout, Scott Fryberger describes, "Milestone shows that Facedown Records still has game."

Steven Cosand, awarding the album five stars from Indie Vision Music, says, "There is something so youthful and refreshing about this band. Milestone stands out lyrically and musically in comparison to recent releases from both secular and Christian bands. Listening to Milestone is like a breath of fresh air. Gideon is hands down the band that has renewed my faith in Christian hardcore." Rating the album an eight out of ten by The Christian Music Review Blog, Jonathan Kemp writes, "It shows great maturity by the band, and is impeccably well done for a sophomore album."

== Track listing ==
All tracks are written by Gideon.

| No. | Title | Length |
|---|---|---|
| 1. | "Gutter" | 3:50 |
| 2. | "Bad Blood" | 2:44 |
| 3. | "No Acceptance" | 2:51 |
| 4. | "Overthrow" | 2:43 |
| 5. | "Prodigal Son" | 2:52 |
| 6. | "Mask" | 2:35 |
| 7. | "Still Alive (featuring Matt Honeycutt of Kublai Khan)" | 3:04 |
| 8. | "Milestone" | 3:02 |
| 9. | "Maternity (featuring Justice Tripp of Trapped Under Ice)" | 2:56 |
| 10. | "Coward" | 2:33 |
| 11. | "Faceless" | 4:00 |
| Total length: | | 33:10 |

== Personnel ==
Gideon

- Daniel McWhorter – vocals
- Daniel McCartney – lead guitar, vocals
- Tyler Riley – rhythm guitar, vocals
- Timothy Naugher – bass
- Jake Smelley – drums

Additional musicians

- Matt Honeycutt – guest vocals on "Still Alive"
- Justice Tripp – guest vocals on "Maternity"

== Charts ==
| Chart (2012) | Peak position |
|---|---|
| US Top Christian Albums (Billboard) | 20 |
| US Heatseekers Albums (Billboard) | 18 |
