= Lost Isles =

Studio album by Oceans Ate Alaska
- Released: 24 February 2015
- Recorded: 2013–2014
- Genres: Metalcore, mathcore
- Length: 41:20
- Label: Fearless
- Producer: Josh Wickman

Oceans Ate Alaska chronology
Into the Deep (2012)	Lost Isles (2015)	Hikari (2017)

Singles from Lost Isles
- 1. "Blood Brothers" Released: 7 October 2014; 2. "Floorboards" Released: 6 January 2015; 3. "Vultures and Sharks" Released: 26 January 2015

Professional ratings
Review scores
Source	Rating
AllMusic	(positive)

Lost Isles is the debut full-length album by British metalcore band Oceans Ate Alaska, released on 24 February 2015 through Fearless Records.

== Track listing ==
All music is composed by Oceans Ate Alaska.

No.	Title	Length
1.	"Fourthirtytwo (Intro)"	1:30
2.	"Blood Brothers"	3:34
3.	"High Horse"	2:46
4.	"Vultures and Sharks"	3:31
5.	"Downsides"	3:38
6.	"Floorboards"	3:55
7.	"Linger"	4:10
8.	"Equinox (Interlude)"	1:31
9.	"Part of Something"	3:03
10.	"Over the Edge"	2:59
11.	"Entity"	3:35
12.	"Lost Isles"	3:35
13.	"Mirage"	6:13
Total length:		41:20

== Personnel ==
Oceans Ate Alaska

- James Harrison – lead vocals
- Adam Zytkiewicz – lead guitar, backing vocals
- James "Jibs" Kennedy – rhythm guitar, backing vocals
- Chris Turner – drums, percussions
- Mike Stanton – bass guitar

Production

- Josh Wickman – production, mixing, mastering
- Chris Turner – engineering

== Charts ==
Chart (2015)	Peak position
US Top Rock Albums (Billboard)	30
