= As Hell Retreats =

American Christian metal band

- Origin: Hendersonville, Tennessee
- Genres: Christian metal, metalcore, deathcore
- Years active: 2005–2012, 2022–present
- Labels: Strike First, Ain't No Grave
- Past members: Jackson Greene; Clint Clayton; Blake Hardman; Tyler Riley; Taylor Jones; Nate Landreth; Seth Steele; Shibby; Cameron Lindmark; Trent Davenport

As Hell Retreats is an American Christian metal band from Hendersonville, Tennessee. The band started making music in 2005, and their membership was lead vocalist, Jackson Greene, lead guitarists, Clint Clayton, Blake Hardman, and Tyler Riley, bass guitarists, Nate Landreth, Seth Steele, and Taylor Jones, and drummer, Trent Davenport. The band released two independently made extended plays, Demo, in 2007, and, Acknowledgement, in 2008. Their first studio album, Revival, was released by Strike First Records, in 2010. The subsequent studio album, Volition, was released by Ain't No Grave Records, in 2011.

== Background ==
As Hell Retreats was Christian metal band from Hendersonville, Tennessee. Their members are lead vocalist, Jackson Greene, lead guitarists, Clint Clayton, Blake Hardman, and Tyler Riley, bass guitarists, Nate Landreth and Taylor Jones, and drummer, Trent Davenport.

== Music history ==
The band commenced as a musical entity in 2005, with their first release, Demo, an extended play, that was released independently in 2007. They release another extended play, Acknowledgement, in 2008, also independently. Their first studio album, Revival, was released by Strike First Records on May 25, 2010. The subsequent studio album, Volition, was released by Ain't No Grave Records on July 26, 2011. This was their final release, as they disbanded in 2012.

== Members ==
Final (known) lineup

- Jackson Greene – lead vocals (2007–2012), bass (2005–2007)
- Trent Davenport – drums (2005–2012)
- Tyler Riley (currently with Gideon) – guitar (2008–2012)
- Taylor Jones – bass (2009–2011, 2012)
- Drew Creal – guitar (2012)

Past members

- Clint Clayton – lead guitar (2005–2007) (2008)
- N.L Carey – vocals (2005–2007)
- Shibby Poole (currently with Yautja) – guitar (2006–2008)
- Blake Hardman (ex–Gideon, ex–Hundredth) – lead guitar (2007–2010)
- Cameron Lindmark – guitar (2007–2008)
- Nate Landreth – bass (2007–2009)
- Seth Steele – bass (2009)

Timeline

== Discography ==
Studio albums

- Revival (May 25, 2010, Strike First)
- Volition (July 26, 2011, Ain't No Grave)

EPs

- Demo (2007, Independent)
- Acknowledgement (2007, Independent)
