= Trilateral (album) =

Studio album by My Ransomed Soul
- Released: February 24, 2015
- Genre: Metalcore
- Length: 28:26
- Label: My Ransomed Soul

My Ransomed Soul chronology
Falsehoods (2013)	Trilateral (2015)

Trilateral is the third studio album from My Ransomed Soul. They released the album on February 24, 2015.

== Critical reception ==
Professional ratings
Review scores
Source	Rating
Cross Rhythms	8/10 squares
HM Magazine	3/5 stars
Indie Vision Music	3/5 stars
Mind Equal Blown	8.0/10
Substream Magazine	3.5/5 stars

Awarding the album three stars from HM Magazine, David Stagg states, "Trilateral has bite", yet "My Ransomed Soul's curse: pantomiming the same dramatic turns most metalcore albums take." Andy Shaw, rating the album an eight out of ten at Cross Rhythms, writes, "My Ransomed Soul are a band that is creatively growing with each album with this set providing a perfect balance between brutality and beauty, anger and a passion for God." Giving the album three and a half stars for Substream Magazine, Eric Spitz describes, "The themes prevalent on the album, in addition to the aggressive melodies and lyrics, complement each other very well, producing a sound that motivates a change of thought to the listeners." Rating the album three stars for Indie Vision Music, Brody Barbour says, "These Maryland natives have unleashed one heck of a record with Trilateral, which is sure to keep them on my radar and get them onto the radar of any fan of metalcore." Craig Roxburgh, awarding the album an 8.0 out of ten from Mind Equals Blown, writes, "My Ransomed Soul is a unique band that draws on so many influences, but manage to condense it in a manner that becomes their own", with a release "That is powerful stuff."

== Track listing ==
No.	Title	Length
1.	"Rise"	0:14
2.	"Mockingbird"	3:25
3.	"Revolt"	3:11
4.	"Rehab"	3:12
5.	"Mockingbird"	2:52
6.	"Trilateral"	1:39
7.	"Apparitions"	1:09
8.	"Reflections"	3:31
9.	"Inundate"	3:22
10.	"Revive"	3:51
Total length:		28:26
