= Erra (band) =

American progressive metalcore band

- Erra performing in 2026. From left to right it depicts Jesse Cash, J.T. Cavey, Alex Ballew, Conor Hesse, and Clint Tustin.

Background information
- Origin: Birmingham, Alabama, U.S.
- Genre: Progressive metalcore
- Years active: 2009–present
- Labels: UNFD; Sumerian; Tragic Hero
- Members: Alex Ballew; Jesse Cash; J.T. Cavey; Conor Hesse; Clint Tustin
- Past members: Adam Hicks; Garrison Lee; Alan Rigdon; Ian Eubanks; Sean Price

Erra (stylized as ERRA) is an American progressive metalcore band from Birmingham, Alabama, formed in 2009. The band has released seven studio albums and three EPs to date. Their latest album, titled Silence Outlives the Earth, was released on March 6, 2026. They have toured with bands such as August Burns Red, TesseracT, Born of Osiris, Ice Nine Kills, Glass Cloud, Within the Ruins, Bad Omens, I See Stars, and Texas in July.

== History ==
=== Early years and Impulse (2009–2011) ===
Erra was formed in 2009 by high school friends Alex Ballew, Jesse Cash, Adam Hicks, Garrison Lee, and Alan Rigdon, in Birmingham, Alabama. The band wrote and self-released two EPs: a self-titled in 2009 and Andromeda in 2010. This gained the attention of Tragic Hero Records, which had signed them in 2011. Later that year, the band released their first studio album Impulse and toured with bands such as Born of Osiris and Upon a Burning Body.

=== Augment and line-up changes (2012–2014) ===
In 2012, Adam Hicks left the band to pursue other career options and the band began writing their second studio album with Cash tracking both guitar and bass for the album. Augment was released and gained the band considerably more attention from touring bands, and they began touring more extensively. Hicks was replaced by guitarist Sean Price, who was included in the "Hybrid Earth" music video. The band toured the following year to promote their second release. Vocalist Garrison Lee and guitarist Alan Rigdon announced their departure from the band in 2014 and left on good terms.

=== Moments of Clarity and Drift (2014–2017) ===
Following the end of their record deal with Tragic Hero, Erra signed to Sumerian Records in mid-2014. Bassist Sean Price moved to rhythm guitar and vocalist Ian Eubanks replaced Garrison Lee's position. In 2014, their third EP Moments of Clarity was released through Sumerian. It reached No. 1 on the Billboard Heatseekers Albums chart. Throughout 2015, Erra opened up for bands such as August Burns Red on their Frozen Flame Tour and TesseracT on their 2015 Polaris album tour. In late 2015, Eubanks parted ways with the band, citing an impact on his health as the main reason.

In 2016, vocalist J.T. Cavey, a former member of Texas in July, joined the band to replace Ian Eubanks's position. Cavey and the band entered the studio and wrote and released their third studio album Drift. The album reached No. 1 on the Billboard Heatseekers Albums chart. The band toured on the Sumerian 10-year tour, along with Born of Osiris, Veil of Maya, After the Burial and Bad Omens. By the end of the year, bassist Conor Hesse was added full time as the band's new bassist.

=== Neon (2018–2019) ===
On June 12, 2018, the band issued the first single from their album Neon. The album was released on August 10, 2018, and is the band's third release on the label Sumerian Records, and the second album to feature J.T. Cavey on vocals. It peaked at No. 1 on the US Billboard 200's Heatseekers Albums chart. In September 2018, the band departed on tour with After the Burial and The Acacia Strain.

On August 8, 2019, the band released a new single titled "Eye of God"; it was made available to pre-save. In August 2019, Erra went on the Neon/Alien tour through North America with Northlane, Crystal Lake and Currents. On October 10, the band released their cover of Queens of the Stone Age's "You Think I Ain't Worth a Dollar, But I Feel Like a Millionaire" on streaming music services.

=== Self-titled fifth album (2020–2022) ===
On August 27, 2020, the band announced that they had parted ways with Sumerian Records and signed with UNFD, and they released a new single "Snowblood" along with a corresponding music video. On November 19, the band released another single "House of Glass".

On January 13, 2021, the band released the third single "Divisionary" along with an accompanying music video. That same day, the band revealed the tracklist, album's official artwork and announced that their new upcoming self-titled fifth studio album is set for release on March 19, 2021. On February 3, one and a half months before the album's release, the band unveiled the fourth single, "Scorpion Hymn". On March 11, the band released the fifth single, "Shadow Autonomous". On September 10, just under six months after the album's original release, the band released an instrumental version of the album.

On October 7, the band unveiled a new version of the song "Vanish Canvas" featuring Courtney LaPlante of Spiritbox along with its music video. On January 21, 2022, the band released the seventh single "Nigh to Silence" while also announcing the deluxe edition of the album which is set to be released on March 18. At the same time, the band officially revealed the album cover and the track list. On February 23, one month before the release, the band released their cover of Muse's "Stockholm Syndrome" on streaming music services. On March 28, the band announced that guitarist Sean Price departed from the band on good terms.

On July 7, the band released a new single titled "Pull from the Ghost", which featured Clint Tustin as the touring guitarist after Price's departure. The band performed a headlining tour throughout July and August of the same name with bands Alpha Wolf, Thornhill, and Invent Animate. On December 1, Erra featured on PhaseOne's single "World Unknown".

=== Cure (2023–2024) ===
In March 2023, the band played a headlining tour in Europe with bands Silent Planet, Invent Animate and Sentinels. Following their European headline tour, the band entered the studio with Dan Braunstein to record new material. The band would add Clint Tustin full time as the secondary guitarist to the band after touring with the band for a year. On August 16, the band released the first single "Pale Iris" and its corresponding music video.

On February 1, 2024, Erra announced that their sixth studio album, Cure, would be released on April 5, 2024. At the same time, they released the title track and video for "Cure", whilst also revealing the album cover and the track list. On February 22, the band unveiled the third single "Blue Reverie" along with an accompanying music video. On March 14, one month before the album release, the band premiered the fourth single "Crawl Backwards Out of Heaven".

=== Silence Outlives the Earth (2025–present) ===
On July 9, 2025, Erra released the first single "Gore of Being" along with a music video and announced the second single "Echo Sonata" which was released on July 18. In December 2025, the band announced that they would be set to co-headline "The Silence Follows Tour" in the United States and Canada from March to April 2026 with Currents, having Aviana and Caskets as supporting acts.

On January 29, 2026, the band unveiled the third single, "Further Eden", and announced their seventh studio album, titled Silence Outlives the Earth, would release on March 6, 2026, whilst also revealing the album cover and the track list. On February 19, the band released their fourth and final single from the album titled, "I. The Many Names of God", the first of a trilogy of songs that closes the album and represents a distinct shift in tone from the previous on the record according to the band.

== Musical style and influences ==
The band has been referred to as "the spearhead of the whole modern/progressive metalcore movement" and have referred to their own style as "melodic-ambient".

They have cited August Burns Red, Misery Signals, Born of Osiris, and Saosin as musical influences.

== Members ==
Current

- Alex Ballew – drums (2009–present)
- Jesse Cash – guitar, clean vocals (2009–present); bass (2014–2016)
- J.T. Cavey – lead vocals (2016–present)
- Conor Hesse – bass (2016–present)
- Clint Tustin – guitar (2023–present; touring member 2022–2023)

Touring

- Trey Celaya – bass (2015)
- Blakeley Townson – bass (2015–2016)
- Dustin Davidson – guitar (2021)

Former

- Adam Hicks – bass (2009–2012)
- Garrison Lee – lead vocals (2009–2014)
- Alan Rigdon – guitar, backing vocals (2009–2014)
- Ian Eubanks – lead vocals (2014–2015)
- Sean Price – guitar (2014–2022; touring member 2023); bass (2012–2016)

Timeline

== Discography ==
=== Studio albums ===
List of studio albums, with selected details and peak chart positions
| Title | Album details | Peak chart positions | | | |
| Title | Album details | US | US Heat | AUS | UK Dig. |
|---|---|---|---|---|---|
| Impulse | Released: November 30, 2011; Label: Tragic Hero; Format: CD, digital download | — | — | — | — |
| Augment | Released: October 29, 2013; Label: Tragic Hero; Format: CD, digital download | 117 | 1 | — | — |
| Drift | Released: April 8, 2016; Label: Sumerian; Format: CD, digital download | 101 | 1 | — | — |
| Neon | Released: August 10, 2018; Label: Sumerian; Format: CD, digital download | 152 | 1 | — | — |
| Erra | Released: March 19, 2021; Label: UNFD; Format: CD, digital download | — | 4 | 52 | 25 |
| Cure | Released: April 5, 2024; Label: UNFD; Format: CD, digital download | — | — | 91 | 47 |
| Silence Outlives the Earth | Released: March 6, 2026; Label: UNFD; Format: CD, digital download | — | — | — | 28 |
"—" denotes a recording that did not chart.

=== Extended plays ===
List of extended plays
| Title | EP details | Peak chart positions |
| Title | EP details | US Heat |
|---|---|---|
| Erra | Released: May 4, 2009; Label: Self-released; Format: Digital download | — |
| Andromeda | Released: December 21, 2010; Label: Self-released; Format: CD, digital download | — |
| Moments of Clarity | Released: November 10, 2014; Label: Sumerian; Format: CD, digital download | 4 |
"—" denotes a recording that did not chart.

=== Singles ===
| Title | Year | Album |
|---|---|---|
| "White Noise" | 2011 | Impulse |
| "Pulse" | 2013 | Augment |
| "Hybrid Earth" | 2013 | Augment |
| "Dreamcatcher" | 2014 | Moments of Clarity |
| "Luminesce" | 2016 | Drift |
| "Drift" | 2016 | Drift |
| "Orchid" | 2016 | Drift |
| "Hourglass" | 2016 | Drift |
| "Disarray" | 2018 | Neon |
| "Breach" | 2018 | Neon |
| "Eye of God" | 2019 | Non-album singles |
| "You Think I Ain't Worth a Dollar, But I Feel Like a Millionaire" (Queens of the Stone Age cover) | 2019 | Non-album singles |
| "Snowblood" | 2020 | Erra |
| "House of Glass" | 2020 | Erra |
| "Divisionary" | 2021 | Erra |
| "Scorpion Hymn" | 2021 | Erra |
| "Shadow Autonomous" | 2021 | Erra |
| "Vanish Canvas" (New version; featuring Courtney LaPlante of Spiritbox) | 2021 | Erra |
| "Nigh to Silence" | 2022 | Erra |
| "Stockholm Syndrome" (Muse cover) | 2022 | Erra |
| "Pull from the Ghost" | 2022 | Non-album single |
| "Pale Iris" | 2023 | Cure |
| "Cure" | 2024 | Cure |
| "Blue Reverie" | 2024 | Cure |
| "Crawl Backwards Out of Heaven" | 2024 | Cure |
| "Gore of Being" | 2025 | Silence Outlives the Earth |
| "Echo Sonata" | 2025 | Silence Outlives the Earth |
| "Further Eden" | 2026 | Silence Outlives the Earth |
| "I. The Many Names of God" | 2026 | Silence Outlives the Earth |

==== As featured artist ====
| Song | Year | Album |
|---|---|---|
| "World Unknown" (PhaseOne featuring Erra) | 2022 | PhaseOne x UNFD |
| "Anything > Human" (Erra featuring Bad Omens) | 2024 | Concrete Jungle [The OST] |
