= Gideon (band) =

American metalcore band

- Origin: Tuscaloosa, Alabama
- Genres: Hardcore punk; metalcore; melodic hardcore; Christian hardcore (early)
- Years active: 2008–present
- Labels: Facedown, Strike First, Equal Vision, Sumerian
- Members: Daniel McWhorter; Tyler Riley; Jake Smelley; Caleb DeRusha
- Past members: Kris Gottlieb; Blake Hardman; Scooter Lee; Timmy Naugher; Daniel McCartney
- Website: www.gideonal.com

Gideon is an American metalcore band formed in Tuscaloosa, Alabama in 2008. The group are currently signed to Sumerian Records, having formerly been with Facedown Records, Equal Vision Records and Strike First Records. They have released a total of six studio albums and two EPs.

== Background ==
The band began in Tuscaloosa, Alabama, in 2008. Gideon are currently made up of vocalist Daniel McWhorter, lead guitarist Tyler Riley, bassist Caleb Derusha and drummer Jake Smelley.

The outfit released an independent extended play project in 2010 with their self-titled Gideon EP. The band were picked up by the smaller label division Strike First Records of Facedown Records in 2011 shortly before they debuted their first studio album Costs. Eventually, the band got the attention of Facedown, who signed the band before the release of Milestone in 2012, making it their second studio album. The album made progress on a few Billboard charts, including the likes of the Christian Albums and Heatseekers Albums. In February 2016, Gideon announced that they had left Facedown Records and had signed to Equal Vision Records and would go on to release their fourth album, "Cold", in May 2017. Cold earned Gideon their best-received and most-successful album debut to date, finding impressive spots on multiple Billboard Charts including: No. 5 on Top Hard Music, No. 15 on Independent Record Label, No. 23 on Top Rock, No. 86 on Top Digital and No. 87 on Top Current.

On February 1, 2019, Gideon released their second EP, No Love/No One, marking a heavier change in their sound. On October 11, 2019, they released their fifth album, Out of Control, on Equal Vision. They also announced that they are no longer a Christian band. “We’re just very open-minded and loved making friends with people,” said vocalist and guitarist Tyler Riley. “And we didn’t understand why — if they believe something else — they would go to a different place when they die. I think that’s what kind of opened the door for me: making all these friends that believe totally different things to me and having to ask myself, 'What did they do to deserve Hell?'” The band had said they had started abandoning their faith as early as 2016.

On June 12, 2026, the band released an EP, 4×4.

== Musical style ==
Sources have put their music into various genres, from hardcore punk to melodic hardcore to metalcore. However, the band have slowly started to pursue a harder style eschewing the more melodic styles in favor towards the thrash side of the spectrum. Until 2019, the band identified as a Christian band, and so their music was built around a Christian atmosphere. As of 2019 the band is no longer a Christian band.

== Members ==
Current members

- Jake Smelley – drums (2008–present)
- Daniel McWhorter – vocals (2010–present) (formerly of The Advocate)
- Tyler Riley – guitar, vocals (2012–present) (formerly of As Hell Retreats), bass (2015–2019)
- Caleb DeRusha – bass (2019–present) (formerly of Those Who Fear)

Past members

- Kris Gottlieb – guitar (2008–2010)
- Scooter Lee – vocals (2008–2010)
- Kevin Davis – guitar (2010–2011)
- Blake Hardman – guitar (2011–2012) (Hundredth, Counterparts)
- Timothy "Timmy" Naugher – bass (2008–2015)
- Daniel McCartney – guitar, vocals (2008–2017), bass (2015–2017)

Former touring musicians

- Travis Higginbotham – bass (2015–2019) (Nothing Til Blood)

Timeline

== Discography ==
=== Studio albums ===
List of studio albums, with selected chart positions
Title	Album details	Peak chart positions	
Title	Album details	US Christ	US Heat
Costs	Released: March 1, 2011; Label: Strike First Records; CD, digital download	—	—
Milestone	Released: July 3, 2012; Label: Facedown Records; CD, digital download	20	18
Calloused	Released: October 14, 2014; Label: Facedown Records; CD, digital download	5	N/A
Cold	Released: May 12, 2017; Label: Equal Vision; CD, digital download, vinyl	—	—
Out of Control	Released: October 11, 2019; Label: Equal Vision; CD, digital download, vinyl	—	—
More Power. More Pain.	Released: March 17, 2023; Label: Equal Vision; CD, digital download, vinyl	—	—

=== EPs ===
- Gideon EP (2010)
- No Love/No One (2019)
- 4×4 (2026)
