= Progressive metalcore =

Music genre

- Other names: Technical metalcore; ambient metalcore
- Stylistic origins: Progressive metal; metalcore
- Cultural origins: Mid 1990s, United States
- Typical instruments: Electric guitar; bass guitar; keyboard; drums; percussion; vocals

Other topics
- Technical death metal; post-metal; deathcore; mathcore; djent

Progressive metalcore (also called technical metalcore or ambient metalcore) is a fusion of progressive metal and metalcore characterized by highly technical lead guitar, "atmospheric" elements, and complex instrumentation. Some notable practitioners take influence from djent.

== History ==
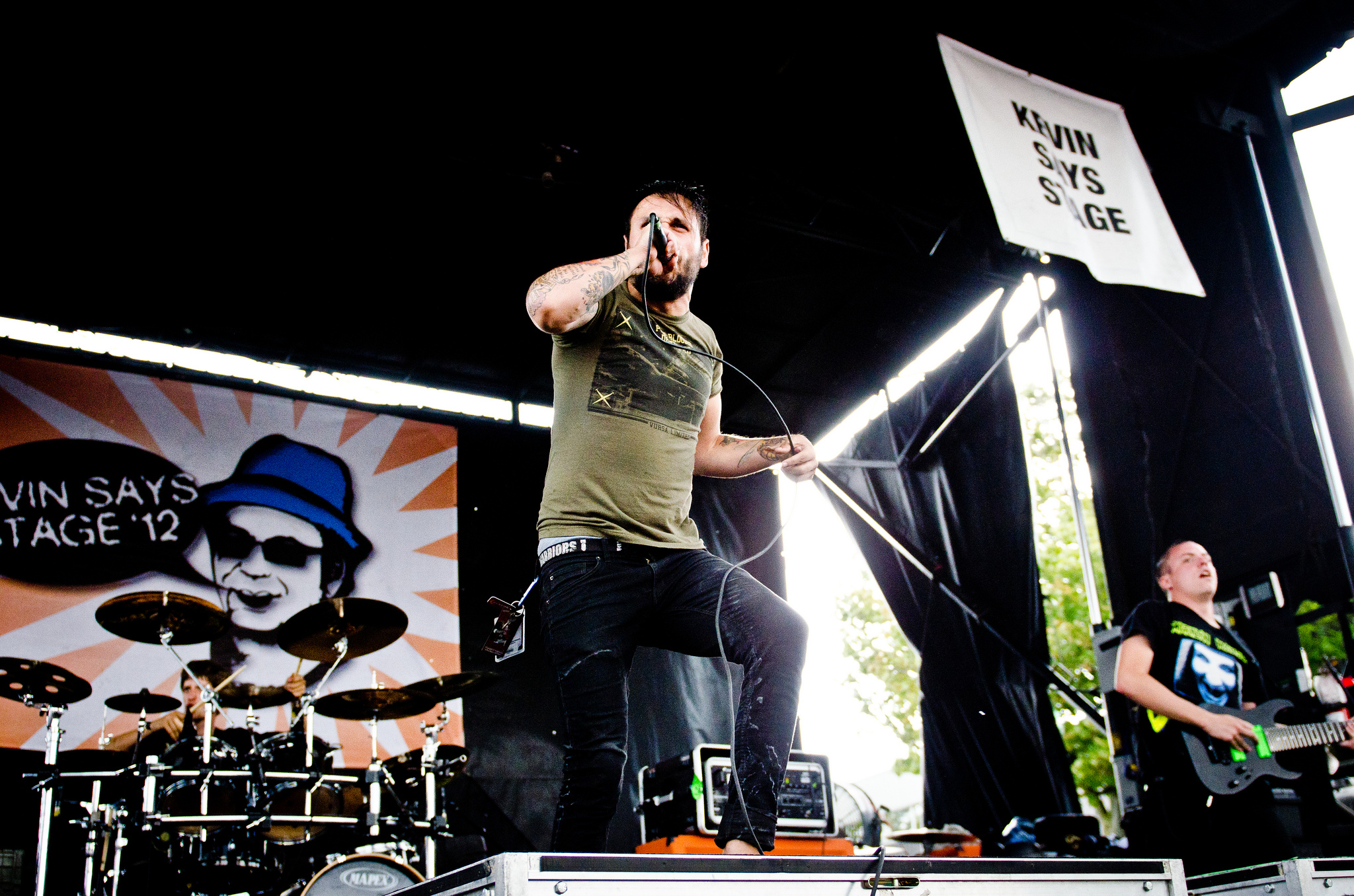
Progressive metalcore band After the Burial in Toronto in 2012

Progressive metalcore evolved from progressive metal and metalcore in the 90s. After the Burial is a pioneer of the genre, forming in 2004 and promoting "a sound that pushed the boundaries of heaviness through the use of extended-scale guitar work." According to the digital ticketing corporation AXS, "After The Burial play progressive metalcore and have been a key contributor to the sound of djent." Erra has been referred to as "the spearhead of the whole modern/progressive metalcore movement" and noted for their "balance between involved riffs, beautiful clean moments and tasty solos." They were formed in 2009 and express their unique version of "progressive technical metalcore" by utilizing "precise stop-and-start arrangements."

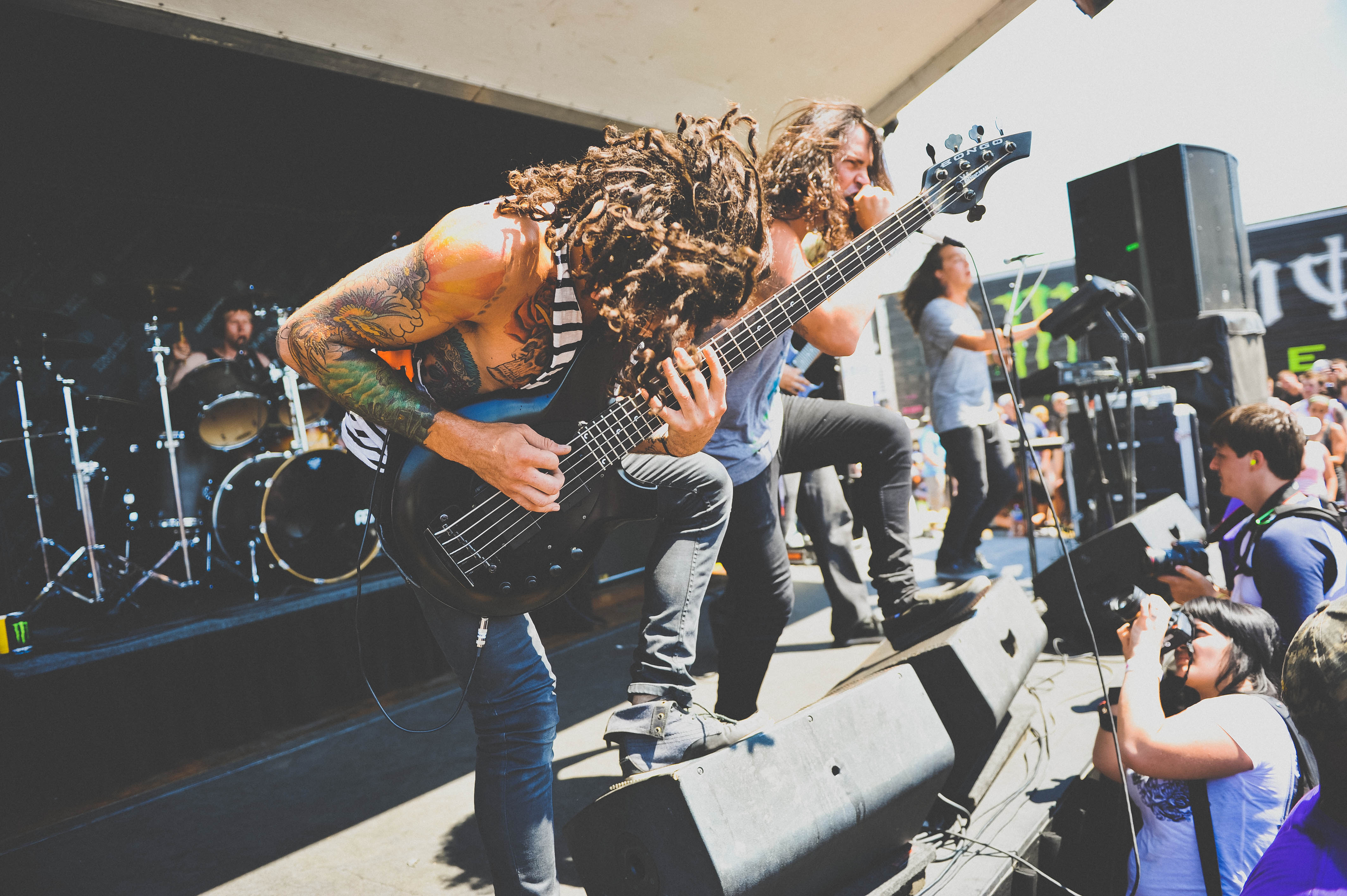
Born of Osiris in 2012 in Shakopee, Minnesota

According to Metal Insider in 2010, "progressive metalcore bands are now appearing all over the place." I, the Breather "weren’t exactly the first" to perform "technical metalcore," but are noted for their "well constructed" instrumentation; they have influenced the style alongside For Today and Born of Osiris, who have been referred to as "the bastions of modern technical metalcore" for their 2013 release Tomorrow We Die Alive. Carcer City is a progressive metalcore band that showcases "technical riffs amid more prominent atmospheric sections." They have been described as "ambient metalcore." According to Corey Deiterman of the Houston Press, Northlane is a primary contributor of the style, and is "making waves with their particular brand of progressive metalcore, which features ... interesting use of space and ambiance." Invent Animate is a progressive metalcore band that formed in Texas in 2011. They have been compared with Northlane and Erra. They focus on "syncopating their music to help build ... ambient soundscapes." The band I Am Noah formed in 2015; rooted in "ambient metalcore," their debut album was "defined by its progressive riffing and percussive assault." Volumes is a djent-influenced progressive metalcore band that has received critical acclaim for their "career-defining" song "Edge Of The Earth," and their 2017 release, Different Animals.

== Characteristics ==
"Seven" by Erra
"Seven" from Erra's debut album, Impulse, demonstrates progressive metalcore's signature emphasis on technical guitar work, distorted riffing, and atmospheric breakdowns.

Progressive metalcore can be distinguished by a marked emphasis on technical guitar-driven songs, sometimes featuring guitar solos. Often "intricate guitar playing dominate(s) the rest of the instruments." Like progressive metal in general, unconventional song structures and varying tempos may be used. Singing may be included, but death growls are more prevalent. The genre is also reliant on the incorporation of "atmospheric sections," ambient instrumentation and repetitive melodies. Progressive metalcore songs often feature intense breakdowns with heavily distorted palm-muted riffs. Some bands utilize keyboard or piano sections as a backdrop.

== Related musical styles ==
- Mathcore is a fusion of heavy metal and hardcore punk that is characterized by dissonant, fast-paced, loosely structured songs, and progressive elements.
- Technical death metal is a progressive heavy metal subgenre that focuses on complex rhythms, riffs, and song structures.

== See also ==
- List of progressive metalcore bands
