= Lonely God (album) =

Studio album by Fit for a King
- Released: August 1, 2025
- Recorded: Los Angeles, CA
- Genres: Metalcore; alternative metal; djent
- Length: 40:08
- Label: Solid State
- Producer: Daniel Braunstein

Fit for a King chronology
The Hell We Create (2022)	Lonely God (2025)

Singles from Lonely God
- 1. "Technium" Released: July 26, 2024; 2. "No Tomorrow" Released: April 25, 2025; 3. "Lonely God" Released: May 30, 2025; 4. "Begin the Sacrifice" Released: June 27, 2025; 5. "Witness the End" Released: July 18, 2025

Lonely God is the eighth studio album by American metalcore band Fit for a King. It was released on August 1, 2025, and was produced by Daniel Braunstein (Spiritbox, Silent Planet), making it their first album since 2016's Deathgrip to not be produced by frequent collaborator Drew Fulk.

== Background ==
On September 27, 2023, Fit for a King announced that they would be slowing down album releases, citing a focus on making "intentional albums". According to vocalist Ryan Kirby, the band was worn down by the touring complications COVID-19 caused and the uncertainty of scheduling shows post-COVID. “We thought, ‘What’s the point of even trying to write? The world has so much other stuff going on, plus there is no guarantee of playing any new material, domestically or internationally.’ We felt defeated in the studio.” There was also the realization that they "weren’t doing what we wanted. We were doing what other people wanted—That’s why The Hell We Create frustrated me. Not because I don’t like the songs, but because we didn’t take any real chances. With The Path, even if people didn’t like it, we tried new things. We pushed boundaries and we asked, 'What will people tolerate from us?'–we used to take risks–writing to avoid losing fans doesn’t help you grow. I like striving for bigger things – and that’s what this record became about.”

For the album's development, the band opted to work with Daniel Braunstein rather than their longtime producer Drew Fulk. For the songwriting, they aimed for more equal collaboration amongst all five band members, giving guitarist Daniel Gailey and drummer Trey Celaya more significant contributions than they had in the past. The album was recorded at Braunstein's studio in Los Angeles throughout 2024, with additional sessions during recording for better cohesion, resulting in the standalone single "Keeping Secrets" which was released in January 26 of that year (and would later be included as a bonus track on the deluxe edition of the album)."One thing we kept telling ourselves this time was: ‘Let’s give people something they can’t find anywhere else.’ On the last record, there were elements of Killswitch Engage or As I Lay Dying, and The Path had Parkway Drive vibes. That’s fine, but if people like those bands…they can just go and listen to their albums instead."

The first single for the album, "Technium" was released in mid-July of 2024; nine months later, on April 25th, 2025, "No Tomorrow" was unveiled. On May 30th, 2025 with the title track released they announced the album and track listing; two more singles, "Begin the Sacrifice" and "Witness the End", followed before the album was ultimately published.

A deluxe edition of the album was released in October 30, 2026, with "Keeping Secrets" and three new songs, of which two were released as singles ahead of the release.

== Critical reception ==
Professional ratings
Review scores
Source	Rating
Boolin Tunes	7.5/10
CaliberTV	9/10
Spotlight Report	3.5/5 stars
Summa Inferno	4/5 stars
Wall of Sound	8.5/10

The album received positive reviews from critics. Wall of Sound wrote that "With Lonely God, Fit for a King invites listeners to confront their struggles head-on, offering both catharsis and hope through an album that showcases the band’s growth and uncompromising energy. This album offers the day one fans familiar styles which would never get old, while also experimenting with new dynamics, as seen in ‘Between Us’ and ‘Shelter’. The result is a record that feels both comfortingly classic and refreshingly bold, cementing Fit For a King’s place at the forefront of modern metalcore." Boolin Tunes called the album an improvement over its predecessors, noting that while leaning "a bit too heavily on convention, the album nonetheless displays new strengths for the band. While themes of Armageddon and the heavily stylised production style give the album a sense of cohesion, there is definitely room for improvement in terms experimentation of structure and instrumentation. As it is, Lonely God is a glimpse into a new Fit for a King; one that could turn out to be sharper than before with subsequent releases." Writing for CaliberTV, Matthew Abraham concluded: "All in all, Lonely God feels like a true return to form for Fit for a King and feels like their best record since 2018’s Dark Skies. These songs feel more fresh and provide a pretty pleasant experience across 12 tracks, and fans of the band will be very pleased with this record." The Spotlight Report was also positive, noting that "Created in the context of our current, highly fractious times, Fit for a King has ignited, unleashing their eighth studio album into a world divided. Lonely God provides a poignant soundtrack to the constructs which challenge us, and is delivered in a quintessential manner: embracing strength, unity and belief in the enduring ‘Brotherhood’ of man." Jorge Tapia of Summa Inferno concluded: "The general consensus is positive: it's a convincing comeback (even being called 'the best since Dark Skies'), a focused evolution without forgetting its heavier roots. While it doesn't reinvent the genre, it reinforces what it does best. Still, Lonely God proves that Fit For a King is far from running out of steam. It’s emotionally charged, technically precise, and crafted with vision. A sharp evolution without losing their core."

== Track listing ==
All tracks are written by Fit for a King and Daniel Braunstein, with additional writers noted.

Lonely God track listing
No.	Title	Writer(s)	Length
1.	"Begin the Sacrifice"		3:59
2.	"The Temple"	Jonathan Gering	3:46
3.	"Extinction"		2:12
4.	"No Tomorrow"		4:12
5.	"Shelter"	Josh Gilbert	3:26
6.	"Monolith" (featuring Lochie Keogh of Alpha Wolf)	Ryan Leitru	2:48
7.	"Lonely God"		3:18
8.	"Between Us"		3:41
9.	"Sentient"		3:40
10.	"Blue Venom"		1:53
11.	"Technium" (featuring Landon Tewers of The Plot in You)		3:05
12.	"Witness the End" (featuring Chris Motionless of Motionless in White)		4:08
Total length:			40:08

Deluxe Edition bonus tracks
No.	Title	Length
1.	"Keeping Secrets"	4:18
2.	"Steady Doom"	2:51
3.	"Blood Pact"	2:52
4.	"Dirt"	3:33
Total length:		53:42

== Personnel ==
Credits adapted from the album's liner notes.

=== Fit for a King ===
- Ryan Kirby – vocals
- Ryan "Tuck" O'Leary – bass
- Daniel Gailey – guitar
- Trey Celaya – drums
- Bobby Lynge – guitar

=== Additional contributors ===
- Daniel Braunstein – production, mixing, mastering
- Lochie Keogh – guest vocals on "Monolith"
- Landon Tewers – guest vocals on "Technium"
- Chris "Motionless" Cerulli – guest vocals on "Witness the End"
- Jackson Eudy – cover artwork
- Jonathan Weiner – photography
- Jim Hughes – layout

== Charts ==
Chart performance for Lonely God
Chart (2025)	Peak position
French Rock & Metal Albums (SNEP)	79
