= Confessions of a Traitor =

British Christian metalcore band

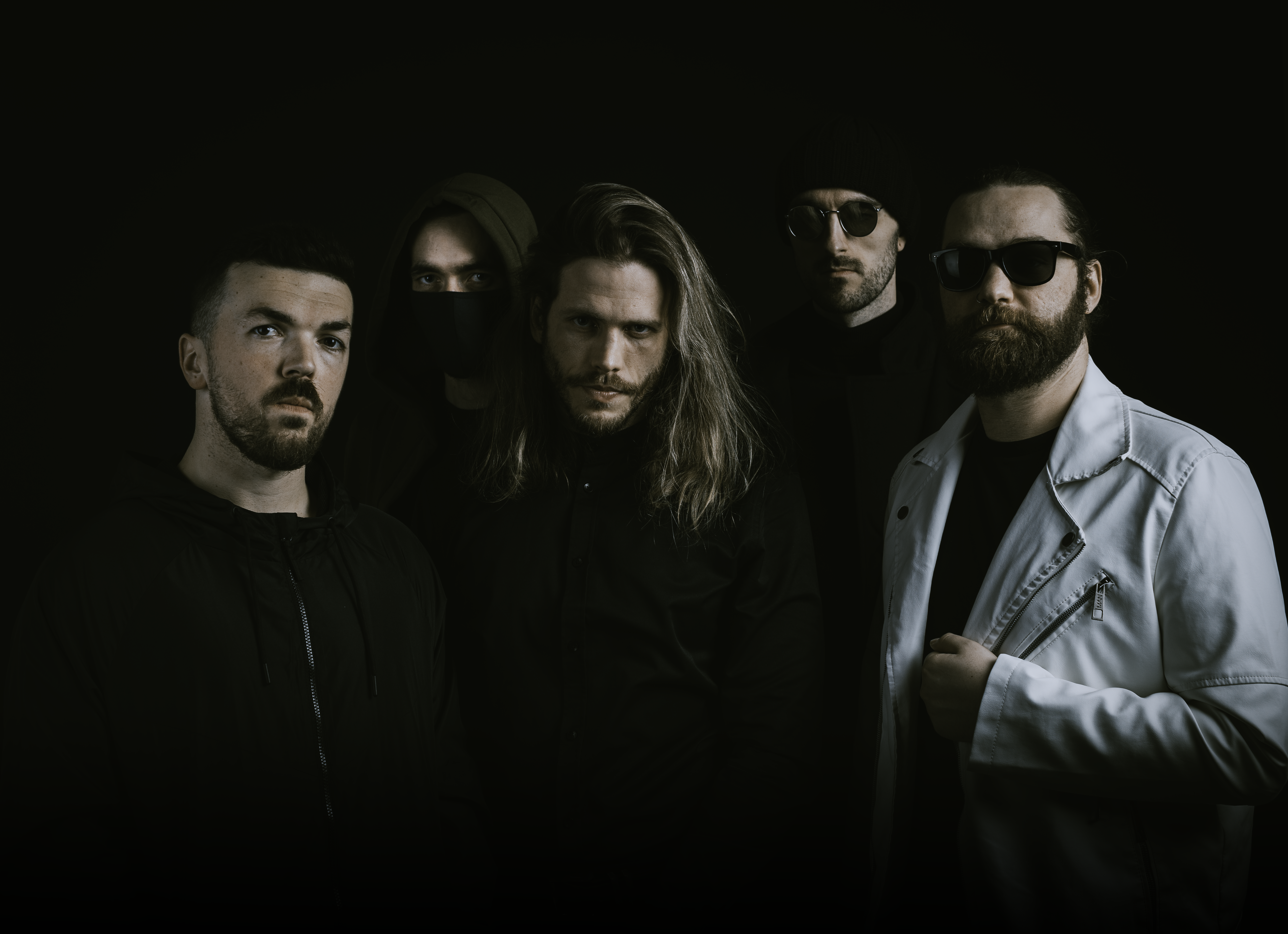
- Promotional image from the release of the band's 2022 album Punishing Myself Before God Does

Background information
- Origin: London, England
- Genres: Metalcore, Christian metal
- Years active: 2015–present
- Labels: Facedown, Sliptrick
- Members: Stephen MacConville; Jack Darnell; Sebastian Olrog
- Past members: Tony Nagle; Dominic Pool; Chris Wallace; Jacob Brand

Confessions of a Traitor (COAT) is a British Christian metalcore band from London. It was formed in 2015 by vocalist and frontman Stephen MacConville, guitarist Jack Darnell, and bassist Tony Nagle. The band was later joined by drummer Sebastian Olrog and rhythm guitarist and vocalist Jacob Brand. They released their debut album, Guided, on Sliptrick Records in 2019. Their second album, Punishing Myself Before God Does, was released in 2022 on Facedown Records.

== History ==
Confessions of a Traitor was formed in 2015 by vocalist and frontman Stephen MacConville, lead guitarist Jack Darnell, and bassist Tony Nagle. The band was joined later by drummer Sebastian Olrog and rhythm guitarist and vocalist Jacob Brand.

The band garnered label interest following tours in the European Union and United Kingdom tours supporting Upon a Burning Body and I Set My Friends on Fire. They signed to Sliptrick Records in 2016 ahead of the release of their 2017 EP, Illuminate.

Following the release of Illuminate, Confessions of a Traitor toured Europe and Russia to support Caliban, Crazy Town, Trapt, Feed Her to The Sharks, and Architects, with subsequent appearances at large European Festivals, such as Rockstad Extreme Fest in Romania and ZaxidFest in Ukraine.

In early 2019, the band went viral after a video of them playing a show in a Denny's in Romania was posted on UNILad Sound's Facebook page. As of December 2023, the video, entitled "Titled Heavy Metal Band Shows up at Café", has 2.5 million views.

Later that year, Confessions of a Traitor released their debut album, Guided, on 18 October through Sliptrick Records. The album features Fit for a King's Ryan Kirby and Bleed From Within's Scott Kennedy.

Throughout 2021, the band released four singles as a part of the Press Start to Play EP, which debuted on 4 June. The EP was a concept record with lyrics based on the video games: Halo, Bioshock, Control, and Life is Strange.

In April 2022, Confessions of a Traitor signed to Facedown Records and subsequently released their debut single "Peacekeeper". They are the first British band to sign to the California-based Christian metal label. In total, five singles were released off the 10 track album ahead of launch.

The band released their sophomore album, Punishing Myself Before God Does, on 16 September 2022. The album charted on four separate Billboard charts: Hard Music (#40), New Artist (#69), and Indie Label (#137). It charted highest on the US Top Christian/Gospel Albums chart at number 12.

In 2022, the band performed at Takedown Festival and Download Festival in the United Kingdom, as well as and Brainstorm and Blast of Eternity Festival in Europe.

During 2023, they completed their first North America tour as main support on "The Aggressive Worship Tour" with Convictions in August 2023. They were supported by Facedown Records' bands Bloodlines and Cultist.

The band released their third studio album, This Pain Will Serve You, on 16 May 2025.

== Band members ==
=== Current members ===
- Stephen MacConville: lead vocals (2015–present)
- Jack Darnell: guitar (2015–present)
- Sebastian Olrog: drums (2015–present)
- Jacob Brand: guitar and vocals (2017–present)

=== Former members ===
- Dominic Pool: guitar (2015-2017)
- Chris Wallace: guitar and vocals (2015)
- Tony Nagle: bass (2015–2023)

== Discography ==
Year	Title	Label	Chart Peaks				
Year	Title	Label	US Top Christian/Gospel Albums	US Top Hard Music Albums	US Top New Artist Albums	US Top Independent Label	US Top Current Digital Albums
2017	Illuminate (EP)	Sliptrick Records					
2019	Guided	Sliptrick Records					
2021	Press Start to Play (EP)	Self Released					
2022	Punishing Myself Before God Does	Facedown Records	12	40	68	137	
2025	This Pain Will Serve You	Facedown Records	6	24		104	103

=== Singles ===
Confessions of a Traitor singles
Year	Album	Title	Ref.
2016	Illuminate	Illuminating The Night	
2016	Illuminate	Through Struggle Hope wIll Anchor Our Souls (ft. JT Cavey of Erra)	
2017	Illuminate	In Darkness Ignite The Spark	
2019	Guided	Ocean Air	
2019	Guided	Myra (ft. Ryan Kirby of Fit For a King)	
2019	Guided	Twelve	
2020	Press Start to Play	Papercut (Linkin Park cover)	
2020	Press Start to Play	Don't Make A Girl A Promise	
2021	Press Start to Play	Man About Town	
2021	Press Start to Play	All The Devils Are Here	
2021	Press Start to Play	Hostile Work Environment	
2022	Punishing Myself Before God Does	Peacekeeper	
2022	Punishing Myself Before God Does	Punishing Myself Before God Does	
2022	Punishing Myself Before God Does	Forever Hollow (ft. Brian Wille of Currents)	
2022	Punishing Myself Before God Does	Lovecraft	
2022	Punishing Myself Before God Does	A Place Where Your Hope Dies	
2024	This Pain Will Serve You	Fatal Frame	
2024	This Pain Will Serve You	Hail Mary (ft. Convictions)	
2025	This Pain Will Serve You	Noble Bloom	
