= Fit for a King (band) =

American metalcore band

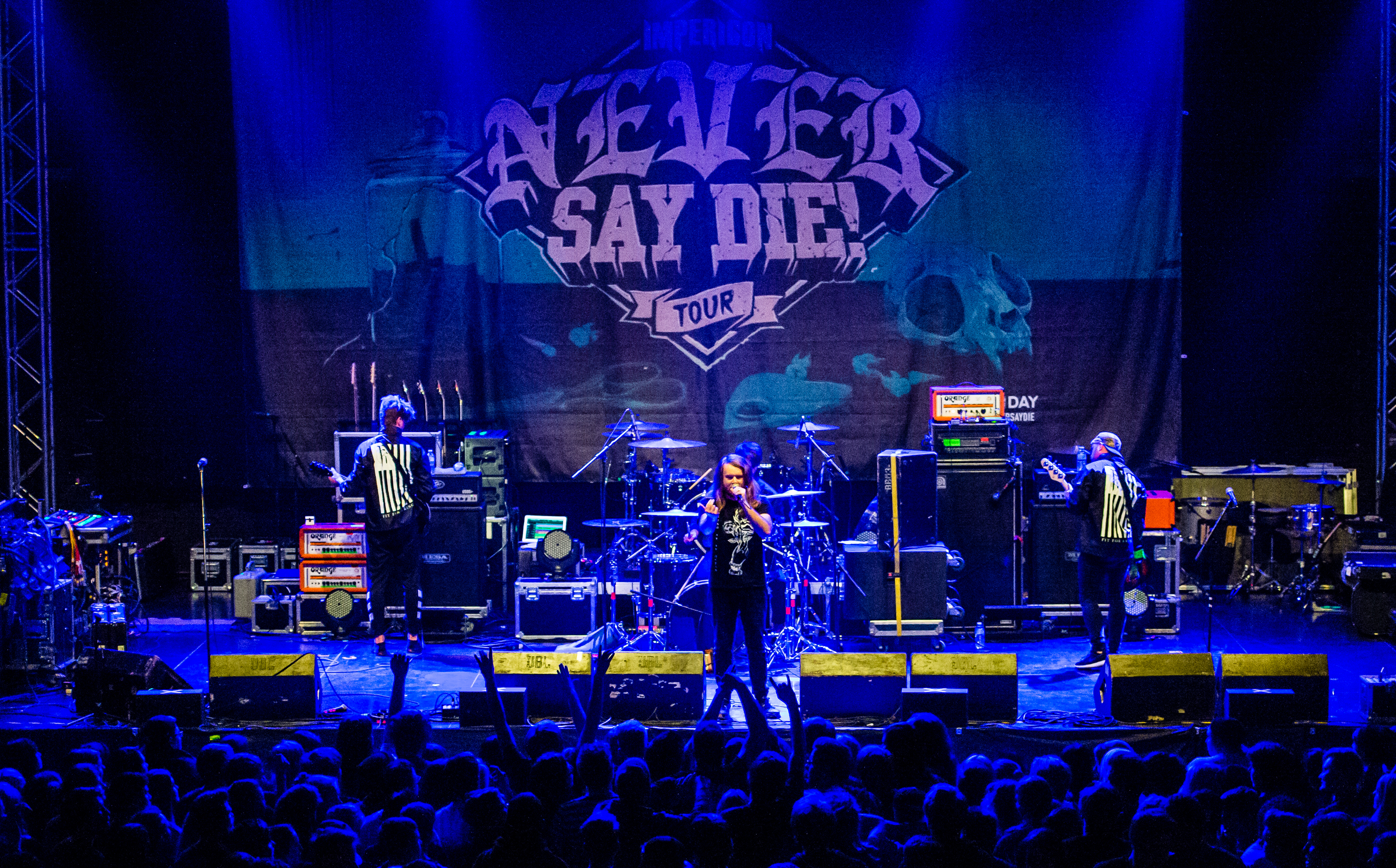
- Fit for a King performing in 2015

Background information
- Origin: Tyler, Texas, U.S.
- Genres: Metalcore; melodic metalcore; deathcore
- Years active: 2007–present
- Label: Solid State
- Members: Ryan Kirby; Bobby Lynge; Ryan "Tuck" O'Leary; Daniel Gailey; Trey Celaya
- Past members: Justin Juno; Alex Danforth; Jed McNeill; Jared McFerron; Mason Wilson; Aaron Decur; Justin Hamra; Ethan Gibson; Aaron "Olan" Kadura; Jared Easterling
- Website: fitforakingband.com

Fit for a King, also known as FFAK, is an American metalcore band from Tyler, Texas, formed in 2007. The band comprises guitarists Bobby Lynge and Daniel Gailey, vocalist Ryan Kirby, bassist Ryan "Tuck" O'Leary, and drummer Trey Celaya. Since the departure of drummer Jared Easterling in 2021, no original members remain in the band. They released two independent EPs entitled Fit for a King in 2008 and Awaken the Vesper in 2009. They also released one independent album, Descendants, in 2011. After the band signed to Solid State Records, they released seven studio albums through this label: Creation/Destruction (2013), Slave to Nothing (2014), Deathgrip (2016), Dark Skies (2018), The Path (2020), The Hell We Create (2022), and Lonely God, which was released on August 1, 2025. In addition, a redux version of their debut studio album was released through the label in 2013.

== History ==
=== Independent days (2007–2012) ===
Fit for a King was formed in Tyler, Texas in 2007 by Jared Easterling, Aaron Decur, Justin Juno, Jared McFerron, Alex Danforth and Jed McNeill. The band had performed locally and regionally and released two EPs in their beginning years. In 2009, the band decided to begin touring full-time, and McNeill and McFerron left the band to pursue their education. Ryan Kirby from the band Bodies Awake (based in Fort Worth) joined the band in 2010 to replace Mason Wilson, who had recently replaced Danforth as the frontman. Kirby's Bodies Awake bandmate Bobby Lynge joined the band to play guitar. The band tracked their first independent debut studio album, Descendants, in 2011. With the release of their music video "Ancient Waters", the band started to gain a following. Bassist Decur left the band in 2011 to pursue a career in law enforcement and was replaced by Aaron Kadura who performed clean vocals alongside Easterling as well.

=== Solid State Records (2012–present) ===
In July 2012, the band had signed to Solid State Records. They released their second studio album Creation/Destruction on March 12, 2013 which also their first album through this label. The album sold more than 3,100 copies in its first week of sales. Billboard charted Creation/Destruction at No. 175, No. 17 on the Christian Albums chart, and No. 6 on the Hard Rock Albums.

In 2013, the band released the redux of their independent debut studio album, Descendants, which came out on November 25, 2013. Billboard charted Descendants at No. 38 on the Christian Albums chart, and at No. 8 on the Heatseekers Albums chart.

The band's third studio album, Slave to Nothing, was released on October 14, 2014 along with three singles including "Slave to Nothing" featuring Mattie Montgomery of For Today. The band released their fourth studio album Deathgrip on October 7, 2016.

The band announced their fifth studio album, Dark Skies, which was released on September 14, 2018. With this announcement the band also released the first single, "Tower of Pain", on June 1, 2018. This single was then followed by four other singles, "The Price of Agony", "Backbreaker", "When Everything Means Nothing" and "Oblivion".

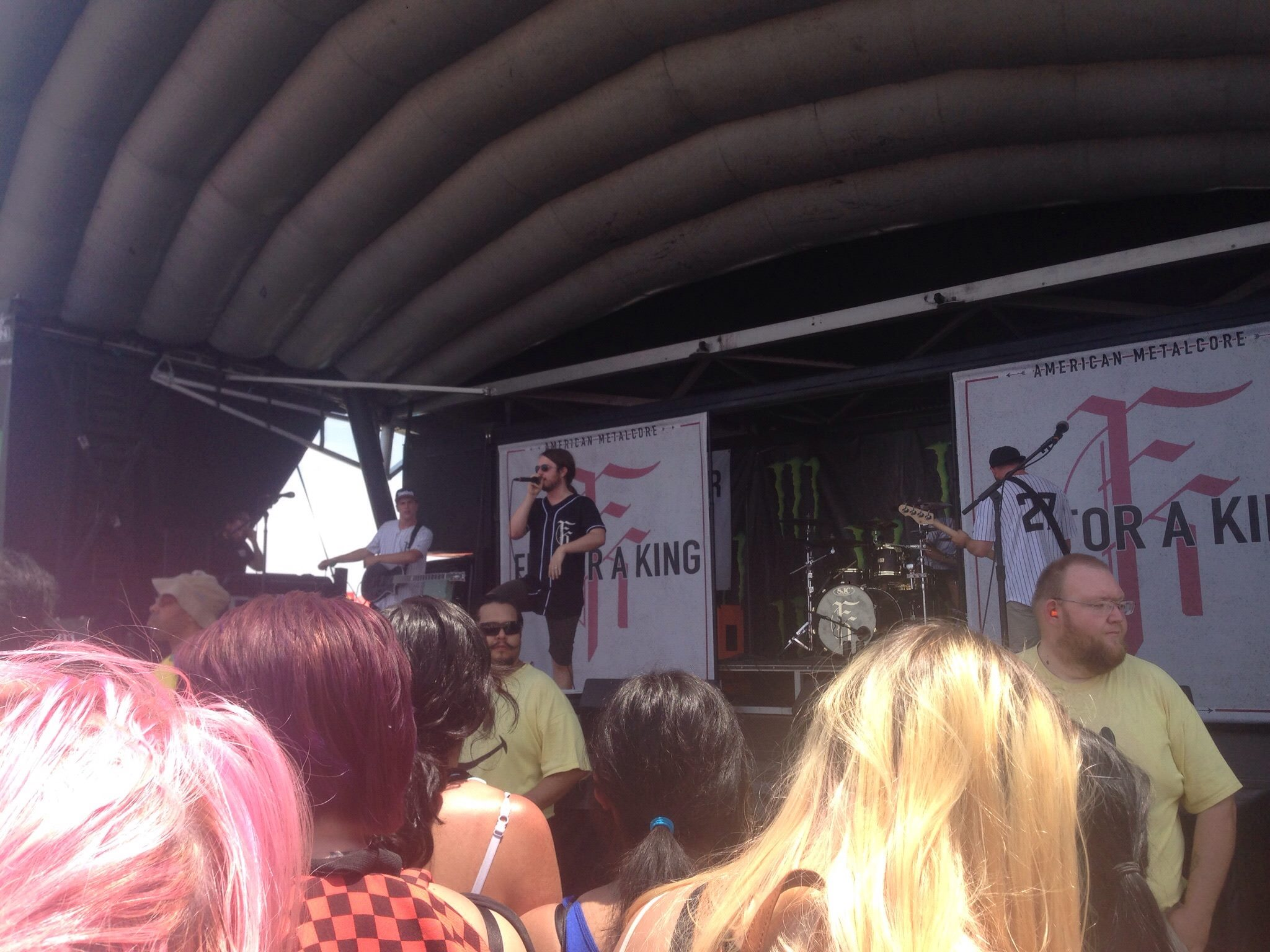
Fit for a King performing on Warped Tour 2015 in Mesa, Arizona

On September 30, 2018, Bobby Lynge announced he would take a break from touring and partially part ways with the band on good terms, citing a need to be with his family and an interest in new business ventures. However, Lynge says he will still be involved in the writing process for the band's next album and he does not exclude to go on tour again with the band.

On March 13, 2020, the band unveiled a new single titled "Breaking the Mirror" along with an accompanying lyric video. On May 14, after unveiling some artworks the prior couple days, the band announced during the global COVID-19 pandemic a surprise collaboration with We Came as Romans. The collaboration included both bands' vocalists being featured on reworked version of their recent tracks and both bands will also release a limited merch line to promote the collaboration.

On July 8, the band announced that their sixth studio album The Path would be released on September 18, 2020. On July 10, the band released the second single "God of Fire" featuring Ryo Kinoshita of Crystal Lake. On August 6, the band released the third single "Locked (In My Head)".

On August 25, the band teased on their social media accounts that the fourth and final single titled "Annihilation" would be released on August 28. On that day, three weeks before the album release, the band released the single. On September 18, the day of the album release, the band released a music video for the title track. On April 9, 2021, the band unveiled another new version of their recent tracks with Silent Planet. On July 16, they dropped a new collaboration EP, Guardians of the Path, with August Burns Red. On December 3, it was announced that founding drummer Jared Easterling had departed the band to play in Koe Wetzel's backing band. Later, it was announced that Trey Celaya of Invent Animate was the band's new drummer.

On June 23, 2022, Fit for a King released the single "Reaper" along with an accompanying music video. On August 10, the band unveiled another single called "End (The Other Side)" and its corresponding music video. They announced that their seventh studio album, The Hell We Create, would be released on October 28, 2022, while also revealed the album cover and the track list. On September 8, the third single "Falling Through the Sky" was published along with a music video. On October 13, two weeks before the album release, the band released the fourth and final single "Times Like This" featuring Jonathan Vigil of The Ghost Inside. On September 27, 2023, the band announced that they would be slowing down album releases, citing a focus on making "intentional albums".

On January 12, 2024, Fit for a King surprise released the brand new single "Keeping Secrets" along with a music video. On July 26th, 2024, the band released another single, "Technium", alongside an accompanying music video, featuring Landon Tewers of The Plot in You. Later, on November 22nd, 2024, the band revealed via posts that they were working on their next album with producer Daniel Braunstein and Josh Gilbert, and that the album would have 13 songs and release sometime in 2025. On May 30th, 2025, the band released another single, "Lonely God", along with the official announcement of the album of the same name, scheduled for release on August 1st, 2025. On June 27th, the fourth single for the album, "Begin the Sacrifice", was released with an accompanying music video. On July 18th, the fifth and final single for the album, "Witness the End", was released. In an interview with Valentino Petrarca from The Aquarian, the band confirmed Lonely God is their first album with completely hand-drawn artwork.

In 2026, the band released a deluxe edition of Lonely God, with four bonus songs, including the 2024 single "Keeping Secrets".

== Influences ==
Fit for a King have cited influences including Linkin Park, A Day to Remember, As I Lay Dying, Parkway Drive, Underoath, the Receiving End of Sirens, Impending Doom, Dredge, For the Fallen Dreams, Leeland, Danyew, Hillsong United, Phil Wickham, the Plot in You, Polaris, Erra, Northlane, Architects, Beartooth, Currents, Silent Planet, Crystal Lake, Like Moths to Flames, the 1975, Paramore, Young Guns, Real Friends, Creeper, Tigers Jaw, Deaf Havana, Logic, the Dillinger Escape Plan, Nails and Incendiary.

== Band members ==
Current members

- Ryan Kirby – lead vocals (2014–present); unclean vocals (2010–2014)
- Bobby Lynge – guitars, backing vocals (2010–present)
- Ryan "Tuck" O'Leary – bass guitar, vocals (2014–present)
- Daniel Gailey – guitars, backing vocals (2018–present)
- Trey Celaya – drums (2021–present); guitars (touring member 2018)

Touring members

- Ryan Leitru – guitars, backing vocals (2025–present, substitute for Bobby Lynge)

Former members

- Jared Easterling – drums (2007–2021); clean vocals (2007–2014)
- Aaron Decur – bass (2008–2011); guitars (2007–2008)
- Jared McFerron – guitars (2007–2009)
- Jed McNeill – keyboards (2007–2009)
- Alex Danforth – unclean vocals (2007–2008)
- Justin Juno – bass (2007–2008)
- Justin Hamra – guitars (2008–2013); backing vocals (2008–2010)
- Mason Wilson – lead vocals (2008–2010); guitars (2008)
- Aaron "Olan" Kadura – bass, clean vocals (2011–2014)

Timeline

== Discography ==
=== Studio albums ===
List of studio albums, with selected chart positions
Title	Album details	Peak chart positions					
Title	Album details	US	US Christ	US Rock	US Hard	US Heat	US Sales
Descendants	Released: September 23, 2011; Label: None (self-released); Formats: CD, digital download	—	38	—	—	8	—
Creation/Destruction	Released: March 12, 2013; Label: Solid State; Formats: CD, digital download, LP	175	17	43	6	3	—
Slave to Nothing	Released: October 14, 2014; Label: Solid State; Formats: CD, digital download, LP	49	3	11	3	—	49
Deathgrip	Released: October 7, 2016; Label: Solid State; Formats: CD, digital download, LP	71	2	18	5	—	32
Dark Skies	Released: September 14, 2018; Label: Solid State; Formats: CD, digital download, LP	69	2	6	3	—	13
The Path	Released: September 18, 2020; Label: Solid State; Formats: CD, digital download, LP	70	1	6	2	—	10
The Hell We Create	Released: October 28, 2022; Label: Solid State; Formats: CD, digital download, LP	—	3	—	12	—	12
Lonely God	Released: August 1, 2025; Label: Solid State; Formats: CD, digital download, LP	—	—	—	—	—	—

=== EPs ===
- Fit for a King (2008)
- Awaken the Vesper (2009)

=== Singles ===
Year	Song	Album
2011	"Ancient Waters"	Descendants
2013	"Warpath"	Creation/Destruction
2013	"Bitter End"	Creation/Destruction
2013	"Hollow King (Sound of the End)"	Creation/Destruction
2013	"Keep Me Alive"	Descendants
2014	"A Greater Sense of Self"	Slave to Nothing
2014	"Young & Undeserving"	Slave to Nothing
2014	"Slave to Nothing" (featuring Mattie Montgomery of For Today)	Slave to Nothing
2016	"Pissed Off"	Deathgrip
2016	"Cold Room"	Deathgrip
2016	"Shadows & Echoes"	Deathgrip
2016	"Dead Memory" (featuring Jake Luhrs of August Burns Red)	Deathgrip
2018	"Tower of Pain"	Dark Skies
2018	"The Price of Agony"	Dark Skies
2018	"Backbreaker"	Dark Skies
2018	"When Everything Means Nothing"	Dark Skies
2018	"Oblivion"	Dark Skies
2020	"Breaking the Mirror"	The Path
2020	"God of Fire" (featuring Ryo Kinoshita of Crystal Lake)	The Path
2020	"Locked (In My Head)"	The Path
2020	"Annihilation"	The Path
2022	"Reaper"	The Hell We Create
2022	"End (The Other Side)"	The Hell We Create
2022	"Falling Through the Sky"	The Hell We Create
2022	"Times Like This" (featuring Jonathan Vigil of The Ghost Inside)	The Hell We Create
2024	"Keeping Secrets"	Non-album single
2024	"Technium" (featuring Landon Tewers of The Plot in You)	Lonely God
2025	"No Tomorrow"	Lonely God
2025	"Lonely God"	Lonely God
2025	"Begin the Sacrifice"	Lonely God
2025	"Witness the End" (featuring Chris Motionless of Motionless in White)	Lonely God
2026	"Blood Pact"	Lonely God (Deluxe Edition)
2026	"Dirt"	Lonely God (Deluxe Edition)

=== Music videos ===
Year	Song	Director	Album
2011	"Ancient Waters"	Stephen Hudgins	Descendants
2012	"Descendants"	Stephen Hudgins	Descendants
2013	"The Roots Within"	Colby Moore	Descendants
2013	"Hollow King (Sound of the End)"	Ryan Valdez	Creation/Destruction
2013	"Keep Me Alive"	Ryan Valdez	Descendants
2014	"Slave to Nothing"	Unknown	Slave to Nothing
2014	"Forever Unbroken"	Unknown	Slave to Nothing
2015	"Impostor"	Unknown	Slave to Nothing
2015	"Hooked"	Unknown	Slave to Nothing
2016	"Dead Memory"	Kevin Johnson	Deathgrip
2017	"Deathgrip"	Kevin Johnson	Deathgrip
2018	"The Price of Agony"	Unknown	Dark Skies
2018	"Oblivion"	Braden Buckner	Dark Skies
2019	"When Everything Means Nothing"	Kevin Johnson	Dark Skies
2020	"Locked (In My Head)"	Kevin Johnson	The Path
2020	"The Path"	Unknown	The Path
2022	"Reaper"	Orie McGinness	The Hell We Create
2022	"End (The Other Side)"	Unknown	The Hell We Create
2022	"Falling Through the Sky"	Unknown	The Hell We Create
2022	"Times Like This"	Unknown	The Hell We Create
2024	"Keeping Secrets"	Unknown	Non-album single
2024	"Techinum"	Garrett Drake	Lonely God
2025	"No Tomorrow"	Josh Hart & Garrett Drake	Lonely God
2025	"Lonely God"	Max Moore	Lonely God
2025	"Begin the Sacrifice"	Garrett Drake	Lonely God
2025	"Witness the End"	Max Moore	Lonely God

=== Collaborations ===
Year	Song	Album	Artist
2011	"Muted Eyes, Deaf Voice" (featuring Ryan Kirby)	Muted Eyes, Deaf Voice	Flood Mercia
2013	"Betrayed" (featuring Ryan Kirby)	Testimony	Yesterday as Today
2013	"The Search, the Scheme" (featuring Ryan Kirby)	Non-album single	A Faylene Sky
2013	"Rebuilt" (featuring Ryan Kirby)	Reconstruction	Silence the Assembly
2013	"Heart of Fire" (featuring Ryan Kirby)	Unworthy	Convictions
2013	"Blood Is Blood" (featuring Ryan Kirby)	Non-album single	My Only Hope
2014	"Thicker Than Water" (featuring Ryan Kirby)	Non-album single	As We Walk
2014	"Ego Trip" (featuring Ryan Kirby)	Death Sentence	Those Who Fear
2014	"Earth Gazer" (featuring Ryan Kirby)	Dreamcatchers	The Royal
2014	"Worthless" (featuring Ryan Kirby)	[II]	Aphzelia
2014	"Martyrdom" (featuring Ryan Kirby)	Facing the Unknown	From Heroes to Legends
2014	"Elapsed Time: Real Life" (featuring Ryan Kirby)	Philosopher	The Betrayer's Judgement
2015	"Pathfinder" (featuring Ryan Kirby)	Non-album single	Melrose
2015	"Safe Harbor" (featuring Ryan Kirby)	Stay Alive	Her Echo
2016	"All That Talk" (featuring Ryan Kirby)	Lunar//Effect	Outer Glow
2016	"Fearless" (featuring Ryan O'Leary)	Sirona	Sirona
2016	"Fame" (featuring Ryan Kirby)	Pariah	Glasslands
2016	"Divinity" (featuring Ryan Kirby)	Tides of Poseidon	Fighting the Phoenix
2016	"Sin Incarnate" (featuring Ryan Kirby)	Our Penance	Nights of Malice
2016	"Extinction" (featuring Ryan Kirby)	Voyager	Above Caelum
2016	"System Failure" (featuring Ryan Kirby)	True Identity://Unclassified	Sins of Sincerity
2016	"Efeitos" (featuring Ryan Kirby)	Do Que Somos Feitos	Sea Smile
2016	"Broken Streets" (featuring Ryan Kirby)	Paramount	It Lies Within
2016	"The Nine" (featuring Ryan Kirby)	Uprooted	A World Extinct
2017	"Obey" (featuring Ryan Kirby)	Rapture	Gallifrey Falls
2017	"False God" (featuring Ryan Kirby)	Symmetry	Immortalis
2017	"Problems" (featuring Ryan Kirby)	Hopeless World	Returning His Crown
2017	"Cold Skin" (featuring Ryan Kirby)	In Dying Arms	In Dying Arms
2017	"I Emerged" (featuring Ryan Kirby)	Non-album single	Forged in the Storm
2017	"The Remedy" (featuring Ryan Kirby)	Polarize	Aviana
2017	"Exodus" (featuring Ryan Kirby)	Non-album single	Versus
2017	"Left Alone" (featuring Ryan Kirby)	Exit Here	Capital Vices
2018	"Groundbreaker" (featuring Ryan Kirby)	Embers	Sable Hills
2018	"Judgement Day" (featuring Ryan Kirby)	Still Just Breathing	Set for the Fall
2018	"The Storm" (featuring Ryan Kirby)	Promises	Sharks in Your Mouth
2019	"Myra" (featuring Ryan Kirby)	Guided	Confessions of a Traitor
2019	"Mammon" (featuring Ryan Kirby)	Relevance	Frank Needs Help
2019	"Effects" (featuring Ryan Kirby)	Changes	Sea Smile
2020	"Hate Me" (featuring Ryan Kirby)	Radiant Dark	If I Were You
2020	"Carry the Weight" (featuring Ryan Kirby)	Non-album single	We Came as Romans
2020	"Heathen" (featuring Ryan Kirby)	Non-album single	The Hero and a Monster
2020	"Words Dissolve" (featuring Ryan Kirby)	Fury by Failure	Lightworker
2020	"C-137" (featuring Ryan Kirby)	Non-album single	Living In False Eyes
2021	"Falling Apart" (featuring Ryan Kirby)	Non-album single	Hollow Front
2021	"The Box" (featuring Brandon Saller and Ryan Kirby)	The Silver Scream 2: Welcome to Horrorwood	Ice Nine Kills
2021	"Poor Millionaire" (featuring Ryan Kirby)	Leveler: 10th Anniversary Edition	August Burns Red
2021	"Provision" (featuring Ryan Kirby)	Guardians of the Path	August Burns Red
2021	"Defender" (featuring Ryan Kirby)	Guardians of the Path	August Burns Red
2021	"Trilogy" (featuring Ryan Kirby)	Non-album single	Silent Planet
2024	"Forgive and Forget" (featuring Ryan Kirby and Ryan "Tuck" O'Leary)	Apologies Are for the Weak: 15th Anniversary Edition	Miss May I
