= Marianas Rest =

Finnish melodic death metal band

- Origin: Kotka, Finland
- Genres: Melodic death metal
- Years active: 2013–present
- Members: Jaakko Mäntymaa; Nico Mänttäri; Harri Sunila; Nico Heininen; Aapo Koivisto; Niko Lindman
- Past members: Harri Vainio (2013–2017)
- Website: Official website

Marianas Rest is a Finnish melodic death metal band formed in Kotka, Finland, in 2013. The band's musical style is characterised by melancholic melodies with influences from doom and black metal.

== History ==
The band released a demo recording, also titled Marianas Rest, in 2014. Their debut album, Horror Vacui, followed in 2016. Keyboardist Aapo Koivisto, who also plays with Omnium Gatherum, joined the band in 2015. The band went on tour with Dark Tranquillity in 2017. In April 2018, the next album was announced, which was released in April 2019 under the title Ruins on Inverse Records.

The third and fourth albums, Fata Morgana (2021) and Auer (2023), were then released on Napalm Records. Aaron Stainthorpe, lead singer of the British band My Dying Bride, featured as a guest vocalist on the final track of the Auer album, Sirens. The Doom of the North tour in 2024 took the band, alongside Aeonian Sorrow, to nine European cities.

In June 2025, the band signed with the German record label Noble Demon.

On 24 October 2025, the new single The Colour of You was released, followed by the accompanying album The Bereaved on 16 January 2026. With its exploration of personal mortality, the music once again centres on a rather sombre theme.

The upcoming Spring of Doom European tour will see the band return to five European countries, this time alongside Aeonian Sorrow and the band Wooden Veins.

== Style ==
Marianas Rest play Melodic death metal.

To describe our music, I would say it is melodic death/doom metal with elements from here and there. Because of our broad musical taste, it can vary a lot from song to song, but overall I think fans of Ghost Brigade or Cult of Luna may like it.

— Niko Lindman on 11.12.2021 quoted by Alex Milazzo in "Mondo Doom, Ceremonies ov Misfortunes"

The band's lyrics tend to have a rather nihilistic tone.

In the lyric department, maybe it is more about scepticism and nihilism. I tend to get negative easily; this way, you get to exorcise these things before they take a too strong hold. And usually, it is enough when we get together and play.

— Jaakko Mäntymaa on 11.12.2021quoted by Alex Milazzo in "Mondo Doom, Ceremonies ov Misfortunes"

== Discography ==
=== Studio albums ===
Title	Details	Peak chart positions
Title	Details	FIN
Horror Vacui	Released: 22 October 2016; Label: Sliptrick Records; Formats: CD, download	—
Ruins	Released: 26 April 2019; Label: Inverse Records; Formats: CD, LP, download	—
Fata Morgana	Released: 12 March 2021; Label: Napalm Records; Formats: CD, LP, download	—
Auer	Released: 24 March 2023; Label: Napalm Records; Formats: CD, LP, download	25
The Bereaved	Released: 16 January 2026; Label:Noble Demon (UCM.ONE); Formats: CD, LP, download	45

In the physical album charts, the album Ruins reached number 8 in Finland (2019, 1 week), “Fata Morgana” at number 9 (2021, 1 week), “Auer” at number 6 (2023, 1 week) and “The Bereaved” at number 3 (2026, 2 weeks).
