= The Sign (Crystal Lake album) =

Studio album by Crystal Lake
- Released: 7 October 2015
- Genres: Metalcore; djent
- Length: 36:19
- Labels: Cube; Artery; JPU; Halfcut; Shock

Crystal Lake chronology
Into the Great Beyond (2010)	The Sign (2015)	True North (2016)

The Sign is the third studio album by Japanese metalcore band Crystal Lake. It was released on 7 October 2015 mainly through Artery and JPU. This is the first album to feature vocalist Ryo Kinoshita after the departure of Kentaro Nishimura in 2011. It is the first and also the last album to feature their third bassist Teruki Takahashi before he left the band.

== Critical reception ==
Professional ratings
Review scores
Source	Rating
JRock News	4.6/5
KillYourStereo	80/100

The album received positive reviews from critics. JRock News gave a positive review and saying: "The Sign is a solid and loud metal album! It's catchy as hell and makes you long for your next metal concert. Crystal Lake was able to create something unique with a pleasant twist to their typical style, each song containing their own individual characteristics, ensuring an energetic and exciting listening experience throughout the entire album." Alex Sievers from KillYourStereo gave the album 80 out of 100 and said: "Yes, one listen to Crystal Lake and it's clear that The Ghost Inside have been a very BIG influence on this band's sound, but they have just the right amount of added groove, heaviness and outside influences to differentiate themselves from The Ghost Inside/Hundredth sounding crowd. Despite the odd misstep, The Sign is the first big chance that Crystal Lake have towards conquering the musical world beyond the shores of their home country. With the reception the record has gotten so far, this could very well be the beginning of something beautiful. Just please don't screw it up, boys."

== Track listing ==
All tracks are written by Ryo Kinoshita, Yudai Miyamoto, Shinya Hori, and Teruki Takahashi.

No.	Title	Length
1.	"Astra"	1:26
2.	"Prometheus"	4:11
3.	"Matrix" (featuring Ikepy of Her Name in Blood)	4:19
4.	"Mercury" (featuring Hironobu Onose of Fact)	3:35
5.	"Dreamcatcher"	4:55
6.	"The Sign"	0:59
7.	"New Romancer"	3:11
8.	"Hades" (featuring Makoto of Sand)	3:17
9.	"Sleep Awake" (featuring Jake Taylor of In Hearts Wake)	4:34
10.	"Light Up the Tunnel"	5:47
Total length:		36:19

== Personnel ==
Crystal Lake

- Ryo Kinoshita – lead vocals
- Yudai Miyamoto – lead guitar, backing vocals
- Shinya Hori – rhythm guitar
- Teruki Takahashi – bass

Additional musicians

- Gaku Taura – drums
- Ikepy of Her Name in Blood – guest vocals on track 3, "Matrix"
- Hironobu Onose of Fact – guest vocals on track 4, "Mercury"
- Makoto of Sand – guest vocals on track 8, "Hades"
- Jake Taylor of In Hearts Wake – guest vocals on track 9, "Sleep Awake"

== Charts ==
Chart (2015)	Peak position
Japanese Albums (Oricon)	36
