= The Hell We Create =

Studio album by Fit for a King
- Released: October 28, 2022
- Genres: Metalcore; deathcore
- Length: 38:21
- Label: Solid State
- Producer: Drew Fulk

Fit for a King chronology
The Path (2020)	The Hell We Create (2022)	Lonely God (2025)

Singles from The Hell We Create
- 1. "Reaper" Released: June 23, 2022; 2. "End (The Other Side)" Released: August 10, 2022; 3. "Falling Through the Sky" Released: September 8, 2022; 4. "Times Like This" Released: October 13, 2022

The Hell We Create is the seventh studio album by American metalcore band Fit for a King. It was released on October 28, 2022, through Solid State Records and was produced by Drew Fulk. It is the band's first release with drummer Trey Celaya.

== Background and promotion ==
On June 23, 2022, the band unveiled the first single titled "Reaper" along with an accompanying music video. On August 10, the band released the second single "End (The Other Side)" and its corresponding music video. At the same time, they announced the album itself, the album cover, the track list, and release date.

On September 8, the third single "Falling Through the Sky" was published along with a music video. On October 13, two weeks before the album release, the band released the fourth and final single "Times Like This" featuring Jonathan Vigil of The Ghost Inside.

== Critical reception ==
Professional ratings
Review scores
Source	Rating
Jesus Freak Hideout	4.5/5 stars
Kerrang!	3/5 stars
Outburn	9/10
Rock 'N' Load	10/10
Sputnikmusic	2.5/5
Wall of Sound	7.5/10

The album received positive reviews from critics. Jesus Freak Hideout rated the album 4.5 out of 5 and said: "The Hell we Create feels like a natural progression stylistically from The Path. For some, this will be a good thing, but for others, it may become stale after a few listens due to the lack of any true variance from the winning formula that has kept FFAK at the top of the game for so long." Kerrang! gave the album 3 out of 5 and stated: "The Hell We Create isn't the most original album, but what's important is what's gone into it. And in that sense, of having a place to put the vagaries of life and the world and to funnel off the darkness away from a place where it can pull you down, it does its job admirably." Outburn scored the album 9 out of 10 and said: "While this may not be the album everyone was necessarily looking for from Fit for a King, after a few listens, many might realize that this is the record they've been waiting for. This record's outstanding instrumental and atmospheric soundscapes, together with its unquestionable lyrical vulnerability, make it well worth listening to. It's clear that Fit for a King gave this experience their all, not to please others, but rather to bravely reveal a side of themselves that they had not previously displayed. For these reasons, The Hell We Create is their best effort to date."

Rock 'N' Load praised the album saying, "FFAK has been one of my favorite bands in the metalcore scene for years thanks to how nothing they do sounds like any of their contemporaries, and The Hell We Create is no different. What we have here is one of the best metal albums of the year, filled with everything fans want, alongside some incredibly deep lyrical content, and some of the best musicianship you can hope to find in the genre. Fit for a King has created a true masterpiece with The Hell We Create and I urge everyone to give it a listen." Wall of Sound gave the album a score 7.5/10 and saying: "Fit for a King have definitely delivered a solid metalcore album with The Hell We Create, however they haven't really done anything we haven't heard from them before. This could be seen as a win or a loss; a win as it's exactly what you would expect from them and they do it oh so well, or a loss, if you wanted to see some growth from the last few albums. Either way, the album features 10-tracks of polished metalcore that will keep fans satisfied for the more-than-likely two year wait until the next record drops."

== Track listing ==
Adapted from Apple Music.

The Hell We Create track listing
No.	Title	Length
1.	"The Hell We Create"	4:14
2.	"End (The Other Side)"	3:50
3.	"Falling Through the Sky"	4:21
4.	"Sink Below"	3:08
5.	"Reaper"	3:19
6.	"Times Like This" (featuring Jonathan Vigil of The Ghost Inside)	4:09
7.	"Eyes Roll Back"	3:29
8.	"Fracture"	3:23
9.	"Reaching Out"	4:21
10.	"What You Left Behind"	4:04
Total length:		38:21

== Personnel ==
Credits adapted from Discogs.

Fit for a King

- Ryan Kirby – lead vocals
- Bobby Lynge – guitars, backing vocals
- Daniel Gailey – guitars, backing vocals, engineering
- Ryan "Tuck" O'Leary – bass, clean vocals
- Trey Celaya – drums

Additional musicians

- Jonathan Vigil of The Ghost Inside – guest vocals on track 6

Additional personnel

- Drew Fulk – production, engineering, mixing, mastering
- Brandon Ebel – executive production
- Zach Jones – additional production on track 7
- Jeff Dunne – mixing, mastering
- Cory Hajde – management
- Matt Anderson – booking
- Adam Skatula – A&R
- Corinne Alexandra – artwork, design

== Charts ==
Chart performance for The Hell We Create
Chart (2022)	Peak position
US Top Christian Albums (Billboard)	3
US Top Hard Rock Albums (Billboard)	12
