= The Weight of Sound =

Studio album by Crystal Lake
- Released: 23 January 2026
- Genre: Metalcore; deathcore
- Length: 40:39
- Label: Century Media
- Producer: Yudai Miyamoto

Crystal Lake chronology
Helix (2018)	The Weight of Sound (2026)

Singles from The Weight of Sound
- 1. "BlüdGod" Released: 30 May 2024; 2. "Crossing Nails" Released: 7 August 2025; 3. "The Weight of Sound" Released: 10 October 2025; 4. "Neversleep" Released: 5 December 2025

The Weight of Sound is the sixth studio album by Japanese metalcore band Crystal Lake. Self-produced by the band's lead guitarist Yudai Miyamoto, the album was released on 23 January 2026. It is their first album released by Century Media Records since leaving SharpTone Records in May 2024.

The Weight of Sound is the band's first studio album in eight years, and serves as the follow-up to their fifth studio album Helix (2018), becoming the longest gap between studio albums to date. It is their first album without founding member rhythm guitarist Shinya Hori and longtime vocalist Ryo Kinoshita, who left the band in July 2020 and September 2022 respectively. In their place, Hisatsugu Taji and John Robert Centorrino of The Last Ten Seconds of Life joined the band. Longtime touring bassist Mitsuru and drummer Gaku Taura upgraded to official members of the band in July 2021, with the band reverting to a quintet for the first time in sixteen years since the release of their second studio album Into the Great Beyond (2010). It is the only album featuring Centorrino, as he would leave the band two months after the release.

The album was preceded by four singles; the lead single "BlüdGod" was released upon their announcement of joining Century Media Records on 30 May 2024 including a feature from Left to Suffer frontman Taylor Barber, the second single "Crossing Nails" was released on 7 August 2025, the title track "The Weight of Sound" was released as the third single on 10 October 2025, and the fourth single "Neversleep", featuring Volumes singer Myke Terry, released on 5 December 2025.

The Weight of Sound heavily features guest vocalists on the album, being included on a total of five out of the eleven songs with guest spots also including Jesse Leach of Killswitch Engage, David Simonich of Signs of the Swarm, and Karl Schuback of Misery Signals. Despite running at only 40 minutes, The Weight of Sound is the band's longest album to date.

== Composition ==
The Weight of Sound has been described by critics as metalcore and deathcore.

== Track listing ==
All lyrics are written by John Robert Centorrino; all music is composed by Yudai Miyamoto.

The Weight of Sound track listing
No.	Title	Length
1.	"Everblack" (featuring David Simonich)	3:16
2.	"BlüdGod" (featuring Taylor Barber)	3:12
3.	"Neversleep" (featuring Myke Terry)	2:49
4.	"King Down"	2:28
5.	"The Undertow" (featuring Karl Schubach)	3:20
6.	"The Weight of Sound"	4:32
7.	"Crossing Nails"	3:41
8.	"Dystopia" (featuring Jesse Leach)	4:13
9.	"Sinner"	4:18
10.	"Don't Breathe"	3:59
11.	"Coma Wave"	4:45
Total length:		40:39

== Personnel ==
Credits are adapted from Tidal.

=== Crystal Lake ===
- John Robert Centorrino – vocals
- Yudai "YD" Miyamoto – guitars, production, engineering
- Hisatsugu "TJ" Taji – guitars
- Mitsuru – bass
- Gaku Taura – drums, engineering

=== Additional contributors ===
- Jeff Dunne – mixing, mastering
- David Simonich – guest vocals on "Everblack"
- Taylor Barber – guest vocals on "BlüdGod"
- Myke Terry – guest vocals on "Neversleep"
- Karl Schubach – guest vocals on "The Undertow"
- Jesse Leach – guest vocals on "Dystopia"

== Charts ==
Chart performance for The Weight of Sound
Chart (2026)	Peak position
Japanese Digital Albums (Oricon)	44
Japanese Rock Albums (Oricon)	13
Japanese Western Albums (Oricon)	17
Japanese Download Albums (Billboard Japan)	40
Japanese Top Albums Sales (Billboard Japan)	91
