= Creation/Destruction =

Studio album by Fit for a King
- Released: March 12, 2013
- Recorded: 2012
- Studios: Planet Red Studios, Richmond, Virginia, U.S.
- Genre: Metalcore
- Length: 35:02
- Label: Solid State
- Producer: Andreas Magnusson

Fit for a King chronology
Descendants (2011)	Creation/Destruction (2013)	Slave to Nothing (2014)

Singles from Creation/Destruction
- 1. "Warpath" Released: January 29, 2013; 2. "Bitter End" Released: March 6, 2013; 3. "Hollow King (Sound of the End)" Released: March 8, 2013

Creation/Destruction (stylized as Creation | Destruction) is the second studio album by American metalcore band Fit for a King. It was released on March 12, 2013, through Solid State Records and was produced by Andreas Magnusson. The album attracted both commercial successes and positive criticism.

== Critical reception ==
Professional ratings
Review scores
Source	Rating
AllMusic	3/5 stars
ChristCore	5/5 stars
Christian Music Zine	4.25/5
Cross Rhythms	10/10 squares
HM	4/5 stars
Indie Vision Music	4/5 stars
Jesus Freak Hideout	4/5 stars
Mind Equals Blown	6.5/10
New Trascendence	8.5/10

Creation/Destruction garnered significantly positive reception from eight music critics ratings and reviews. At HM, Jef Cunningham rated the album four stars out of five, stating it is a "solid release". Graeme Crawford of Cross Rhythms rated it a perfect ten squares, writing that "On this form they deserve to be in the highest league of Christian metal bands". At Jesus Freak Hideout, Michael Weaver rated the album four stars out of five, saying that because of this album and others "Solid State is poised to reclaim their title as Christian metal kings." Scott Fryberger of Jesus Freak Hideout rated the album four stars out of five, stating that "It's a little generic, and they probably could have done a lot more as far as creativity to give each song more of a distinct flair, but I think they could pull that off with another album or two under their belts." At Indie Vision Music, Brody B rated the album four stars out of five, writing that "While Fit For A King are still young, they manage to create what is simply excellent metalcore." Gregory Heaney of AllMusic rated the album three stars out of five, saying that it is a "promising debut". At ChristCore, Anthony Ibarra rated the album a perfect five stars, stating that this is a "must have". Anthony Peronto of Christian Music Zine rated it 4.25 out of five, writing that the band "have proven themselves worthy" with this release. At Mind Equals Blown, Austin Gordon rated the album a 6.5 out of ten, saying that "When you're in the mood for it, simple is good."

== Commercial performance ==
For the Billboard charting week of March 30, 2013, Creation/Destruction charted at No. 175 on the Billboard 200, No. 17 on the Christian Albums chart, No. 43 on the Top Rock Albums chart, No. 6 on the Hard Rock Albums, and No. 3 on the Heatseekers Albums chart. The album sold more than 3,100 copies in its first week of sales.

== Track listing ==
No.	Title	Length
1.	"Creation"	0:29
2.	"Warpath"	3:15
3.	"Hollow King (Sound of the End)"	3:35
4.	"Broken Fame"	3:19
5.	"Bitter End"	3:17
6.	"Skin & Bones"	3:56
7.	"The Resistance"	4:15
8.	"Identity"	3:04
9.	"The Lioness"	3:20
10.	"Eyes to See"	3:02
11.	"Destruction"	3:26
Total length:		35:02

== Personnel ==
Credits adapted from AllMusic.

Fit for a King

- Ryan Kirby – unclean vocals
- Bobby Lynge – guitars, backing vocals
- Justin Hamra – guitars
- Aaron "Olan" Kadura – bass, clean vocals
- Jared Easterling – drums, clean vocals

Additional personnel

- Andreas Magnusson – production, engineering, mixing
- Brandon Ebel – executive production
- Troy Glessner – mastering
- Adam Skatula – A&R
- Ryan Clark – design

== Charts ==
Chart (2013)	Peak position
US Billboard 200	175
US Top Christian Albums (Billboard)	17
US Top Hard Rock Albums (Billboard)	6
US Heatseekers Albums (Billboard)	3
US Top Rock Albums (Billboard)	43
