= Helix (Crystal Lake album) =

Studio album by Crystal Lake
- Released: 28 November 2018
- Genres: Metalcore; progressive metal; deathcore
- Length: 40:26
- Labels: Cube; SharpTone
- Producers: Crystal Lake; Daihei Yamanaka

Crystal Lake chronology
True North (2016)	Helix (2018)	The Weight of Sound (2026)

Singles from Helix
- 1. "Apollo" Released: 5 October 2017; 2. "Aeon" Released: 28 November 2018; 3. "Lost in Forever" Released: 5 January 2019; 4. "Devilcry" Released: 21 February 2019; 5. "Hail to the Fire" Released: 22 March 2019; 6. "Sanctuary" Released: 15 January 2020

Helix is the fifth studio album by Japanese metalcore band Crystal Lake. It was released on 28 November 2018 in Japan and on 15 February 2019 worldwide through SharpTone Records. It was produced by Daihei Yamanaka and the band themselves. It is the first release on this label since the band's departure from Artery Recordings. It is also the last album to feature their founding rhythm guitarist Shinya Hori before he left the band in 2020, and vocalist Ryo Kinoshita before his departure in September 2022.

== Critical reception ==
Professional ratings
Review scores
Source	Rating
Dead Press!	6/10
Distorted Sound	9/10
Exclaim!	7/10
KillYourStereo	70/100
New Noise	3.5/5 stars
New Transcendence	10/10
Rock 'N' Load	8/10

The album received mostly positive reviews, but also mixed reviews from several critics. Carlos Zelaya from Dead Press! rated the album positively calling it: "Crystal Lake clearly have plenty of dexterity and talent in abundance, but sometimes you're left wishing they could flex their left-field muscles a little more. To say that Helix is a bad album would be totally unfair, but at worst, parts of this album leave a lot to be desired. Including more songs such as 'Aeon' would be a big improvement for sure. The metalcore scene is only getting more and more crowded, and you've got to offer more than occasional glitchy bits in order to truly stand out." Distorted Sound scored the album 9 out of 10 and said: "Helix is a compacted explosion of crazy, eccentric lunacy which will leave you reeling for the majority of its run time. If you doubted that CRYSTAL LAKE could match the intensity of 'Aeon' for a full album then you couldn't be more wrong. There are few bands which could come close to matching the sheer energy expelled from this release and there is no doubt that jaws will be dropping all over the world when this album hits the shelves." Joe Smith-Engelhardt of Exclaim! gave it 7 out of 10 and said: "Although Helix has some truly spectacular moments, it's sullied by trying to be too many things. Whether Crystal Lake want to be one of the heaviest metalcore acts or take a stab at a cleaner, electronic-leaning sound they should come to a consensus on who they are in order to have a more cohesive approach." Alex Sievers from KillYourStereo gave the album 70 out of 100 and said: "Metalcore absolutely needs bands like Crystal Lake, and not just in terms of their output, but in terms of their successes too. However, when a record like Helix doesn't quite live up to the hype, and manages to both be different and creative yet also rather safe and expected, it's best to be honest and not see how blindly loyal one can be. Although, the good present here truly outweighs the lacking and the bad, so please don't skip over this one." New Noise gave the album 3.5 out of 5 and stated: "Helix is a very interesting record, but it also feels like a transition point for greater pastures ahead. It hints that the next step for Crystal Lake is likely a groovier take on melodic hardcore, and the fact that they do that very well on this record is cause for further optimism." New Transcendence gave the album a perfect score 10/10 and saying: "To sum things up, I think of a few things. One, this was a perfect way to evolve from True North. Elements of the past work still show in Helix, while also showing that Helix in and of itself is a masterpiece. The way things are handled just adds even more depth to the album. From the samples to instrumentals, everything works together more efficiently than before. Two, its just nice to see some experimentation done. Hearing Aeon was like a slap in my face of what Crystal Lake could achieve. I was beyond pleased, and as a vocalist who primarily is involved in deathcore/slam, hearing Ryo's range blossom even more and branching into high screams and gutturals was insane. Not to mention, instrumentally as a whole, that track blew me away." Rock 'N' Load praised the album saying, "The fifth album from Japan's premier metalcore brigade is an absolute belter, from the cyborg intro 'Helix' to the final strains of 'Sanctuary' it just melts faces with serious speed, power and absolute precision."

== Track listing ==
All tracks are written by Ryo Kinoshita, Yudai Miyamoto, and Shinya Hori.

No.	Title	Length
1.	"Helix"	0:11
2.	"Aeon" (featuring AJ Rebollo of Issues)	3:13
3.	"Agony"	5:07
4.	"+81"	3:19
5.	"Lost in Forever" (featuring Daniel McWhorter and Tyler Riley of Gideon)	4:09
6.	"Outgrow"	4:02
7.	"Ritual"	0:26
8.	"Hail to the Fire"	3:09
9.	"Devilcry"	4:25
10.	"Just Confusing"	3:11
11.	"Apollo"	5:12
12.	"Sanctuary"	4:00
Total length:		40:26

== Personnel ==
Credits adapted from AllMusic.

Crystal Lake

- Ryo Kinoshita – lead vocals, lyrics, composition
- Yudai Miyamoto – lead guitar, backing vocals, composition
- Shinya Hori – rhythm guitar

Additional musicians

- Bitoku Sakamoto – bass
- Gaku Taura – drums
- AJ Rebollo of Issues – guest vocals on "Aeon"
- Daniel McWhorter and Tyler Riley of Gideon – guest vocals on "Lost in Forever"
- Kaya Otomo – background vocals
- Satsuki Makimura – background vocals

Additional personnel

- Crystal Lake – production
- Daihei Yamanaka – engineering, production
- Drew Fulk – mastering, mixing
- Jeff Dunne – mastering, mixing
- Tetsuya Nagayama – programming
- Jason Mageau – management

== Charts ==
Chart performance for Helix
Chart (2018–19)	Peak position
Japanese Albums (Oricon)	23
US Heatseekers Albums (Billboard)	9
US Independent Albums (Billboard)	23
