= Slave to Nothing =

Studio album by Fit for a King
- Released: October 14, 2014
- Recorded: 2014
- Studios: The Machine Shop, Belleville, New Jersey
- Genre: Metalcore
- Length: 39:41
- Label: Solid State
- Producer: Will Putney

Fit for a King chronology
Creation/Destruction (2013)	Slave to Nothing (2014)	Deathgrip (2016)

Singles from Slave to Nothing
- 1. "A Greater Sense of Self" Released: August 27, 2014; 2. "Young & Undeserving" Released: September 24, 2014; 3. "Slave to Nothing" Released: October 9, 2014

Slave to Nothing is the third studio album by American metalcore band Fit for a King. It was released on October 14, 2014, through Solid State Records and was produced by Will Putney.

== Critical reception ==
Professional ratings
Review scores
Source	Rating
ChristCore	8.3/10
Indie Vision Music	4/5 stars
Jesus Freak Hideout	4.5/5 stars 4/5 stars
Louder Sound	2/5 stars

Awarding the album four and a half stars from Jesus Freak Hideout, Scott Fryberger states, "Slave to Nothing is the result of Fit For A King's hard work and dedication to their craft, and it's one of the best hardcore albums to have been released in an otherwise seemingly lackluster year for Christian hardcore." Dylan Minson, rating the album four stars at Jesus Freak Hideout, writes, "This album employs quite a bit of chugging, which tends to get old on this record, but doesn't entirely detract from the quality." Giving the album four stars for Indie Vision Music, Brody Barbour describes, "The band has continued to mature and push the envelope on their sound rather than sit idle and rake in some quick cash." Anthony Ibarra, indicating in an 8.3 out of ten review by ChristCore, says, "Fit For a King continues to reinvent themselves and the boundaries of their genre." Louder Sound gave the album a slightly negative review and stated: "Sophomore release Slave to Nothing is, on the surface, no different to the latest from scene heavyweights Upon a Burning Body, but it lacks their knack for a hook. Instead they fade further into the ether as the album rolls on. This isn't to say it's a poor record; the percussive assault on the title track is admirable and the clean vocals throughout are a cut above the majority of their peers, but that's where the uniqueness ends. There are nods towards more experimental territory – and it does sound like they've thrown the kitchen sink emporium around the studio – but the missing cohesion leaves the record floundering and struggling to grab you."

== Track listing ==
All tracks are written by Fit for a King

No.	Title	Length
1.	"Kill the Pain"	3:20
2.	"Young & Undeserving"	3:53
3.	"Slave to Nothing" (featuring Mattie Montgomery of For Today)	3:56
4.	"Break Away"	3:40
5.	"Hooked"	3:12
6.	"Selfish Eyes"	3:42
7.	"A Greater Sense of Self"	4:01
8.	"Forever Unbroken"	3:14
9.	"Impostor"	3:03
10.	"Cleanse My Soul"	3:25
11.	"The Final Thoughts of a Dying Man"	4:10
Total length:		39:41

== Personnel ==
Credits adapted from AllMusic.

Fit for a King

- Ryan Kirby – lead vocals
- Bobby Lynge – guitars, backing vocals
- Ryan "Tuck" O'Leary – bass, clean vocals
- Jared Easterling – drums

Additional musicians

- Mattie Montgomery – guest vocals on track 3

Additional personnel

- Will Putney – production, engineering, mixing, mastering
- Brandon Ebel – executive production
- Randy Laboeuf and Tom Smith – engineering
- Adam Skatula – A&R
- Sol Amstutz – illustrations
- Matt Naylor – design, layout

== Charts ==
Chart (2014)	Peak position
US Billboard 200	49
US Top Christian Albums (Billboard)	3
US Top Hard Rock Albums (Billboard)	3
US Independent Albums (Billboard)	8
US Top Rock Albums (Billboard)	11
