= Death Sentence (album) =

Studio album by Those Who Fear
- Released: June 24, 2014
- Genre: Christian hardcore, hardcore punk, grindcore
- Length: 42:52
- Label: Facedown
- Producer: Trevor Kope, Josh Schroeder

Those Who Fear chronology
Unholy Anger (2013)	Death Sentence (2014)

Death Sentence is the second studio album from Those Who Fear. Facedown Records released the album on June 24, 2014. Those Who Fear worked with Josh Schroeder on the production of this album.

On February 2, 2016, Facedown released a B-side on YouTube from the album entitled "Bulletproof".

== Critical reception ==
Professional ratings
Review scores
Source	Rating
Christ Core	8.5/10
Christian Review Magazine	3.5/5 stars
Exclaim!	3/10
HM Magazine	4.5/5 stars
Indie Vision Music	4/5 stars
Jesus Freak Hideout	2.5/5 stars

Awarding the album four and a half stars for HM Magazine, Collin Simula states, "Death Sentence actually sounds phenomenal; it's expansive, solid, and mixed perfectly." Bradley Zorgdrager, rating the album a three out of ten at Exclaim!, says, "Breakdowns and the heaviness they entail should be a means to an end, not an end in itself; until Those Who Fear realize this, their hackneyed usage will drag the band down." Giving the album two and a half stars from Jesus Freak Hideout, Scott Fryberger describes, "Those Who Fear isn't a bad band, and they certainly show some strengths here and there, but overall, Death Sentence is largely forgettable."

Lee Brown, awarding the album four stars by Indie Vision Music, writes, "the latter portion of the album is simply fantastic". Giving the album three and a half stars for Christian Review Magazine, Christian St. John says, "Those Who Fear deliver the goods on Death Sentence!" Anthony Ibarra, rating the album an 8.5 out of ten from Christ Core, states, "With unrelenting passion and aggression, their music has proven to be a force to be reckoned with. Heavy-hitting drums, low-tuned guitars, and raw vocals pervade their new release, Death Sentence."

== Track listing ==
No.	Title	Length
1.	"Processed"	0:54
2.	"Bruised"	2:55
3.	"Bear These Scars"	2:45
4.	"Ego Trip" (featuring Ryan Kirby of Fit for a King)	3:12
5.	"The Pain I Feel"	3:10
6.	"The First Amendment"	3:29
7.	"Sunday Night Special"	5:04
8.	"Cop Out"	3:21
9.	"Eyes of Eternity"	3:11
10.	"Death Sentence"	2:22
11.	"86'd"	3:22
12.	"We're Not the Victims"	3:05
13.	"Indifferent"	6:02
Total length:		42:52

Bonus Tracks
No.	Title	Length
1.	"Bulletproof"	3:32
2.	"A.W.O.L."	4:11

== Chart performance ==
Chart (2014)	Peak position
US Christian Albums (Billboard)	19
US Heatseekers Albums (Billboard)	19

== Credits ==
Those Who Fear

- John Healy – vocals
- Luke Healy – lead guitar
- Caleb Derusha – rhythm guitar
- Josh Ziegler – bass

Additional musicians

- Ryan Kirby (Fit for a King) – guest vocals
