= True North (Crystal Lake album) =

Studio album by Crystal Lake
- Released: 30 November 2016
- Genres: Metalcore; progressive metal; nu metal
- Length: 35:31
- Labels: Cube; Artery

Crystal Lake chronology
The Sign (2015)	True North (2016)	Helix (2018)

True North is the fourth studio album by Japanese metalcore band Crystal Lake. It was released on 30 November 2016 mainly through Artery. It is the last album to be released on this label.

== Critical reception ==
Professional ratings
Review scores
Source	Rating
KillYourStereo	70/100
Louder Sound	2/5 stars
Rock Sound	6/10

The album received mostly positive reviews, but also mixed reviews from several critics. Charles Shepherd of JRock News gave a positive review and saying: "True North isn't the bands best album, but they've still managed to pull off some killer tracks that really stand out as overall highlights of their discography. These guys still have the potential to release some prime material in the coming years, and if The Sign was the album that pointed CRYSTAL LAKE in the right direction, True North might be the album that takes them the distance of becoming a bigger name on this side of the globe." Alex Sievers from KillYourStereo gave the album 70 out of 100 and said: "Crystal Lake is really starting to step out of their hardcore, metalcore shell and an album like True North sets them strongly down that path for the future. It's still heavy and it most definitely fits their usual sonic template with plenty of palm-muted chugs, tight breakdowns, and heavy screaming, but the band is instrumentally and melodically branching out now. And that's for the better, as it's these moments that provide the record's highlights, and 'Waves' may just be one of the band's greatest." but goes on to say, "I must say that this is actually one of Crystal Lake's weakest releases. While more personalised and while still good, it's just far from being their best." Louder Sound gave the album a slightly negative review and stated: "With new management from Good Charlotte's Joel Madden, Crystal Lake – who have been active in their native Japan since 2002 – want to introduce themselves to the world. Unfortunately, True North might not elicit the welcome they're hoping for. [...] There are a lot of ideas on here, but very few of them seem to be Crystal Lake's own." Rock Sound gave it 6 out of 10 and said: "On a few occasions – especially in the album's latter half – there are the odd lumpen lyrics and some baffling, EDM-tinged production choices, but in general this is solid stuff, worthy of global recognition."

== Track listing ==
All tracks are written by Ryo Kinoshita, Yudai Miyamoto, and Shinya Hori.

No.	Title	Length
1.	"Alpha"	1:53
2.	"Omega" (featuring Kaya Otomo)	4:19
3.	"Hatred"	3:46
4.	"Metro" (featuring Kaya Otomo)	4:16
5.	"True North"	4:37
6.	"Breathe Deep"	3:23
7.	"Black and Blue" (featuring Jesse McFaddin of Rize)	4:03
8.	"Six Feet Under"	2:15
9.	"Walk on Water"	1:35
10.	"Waves" (featuring Kaya Otomo)	5:18
Total length:		35:31

== Personnel ==
Crystal Lake

- Ryo Kinoshita – lead vocals
- Yudai Miyamoto – lead guitar, backing vocals
- Shinya Hori – rhythm guitar

Additional musicians

- Bitoku Sakamoto – bass
- Gaku Taura – drums
- Kaya Otomo – background vocals on tracks 2, 4 and 10 ("Omega", "Metro" and "Waves")
- Jesse McFaddin of Rize – guest vocals on track 7, "Black and Blue"

== Charts ==
Chart (2016)	Peak position
Japanese Albums (Oricon)	39
