= Unholy Anger =

Studio album by Those Who Fear
- Released: February 5, 2013
- Genre: Christian hardcore, hardcore punk, metalcore
- Length: 37:54
- Label: Facedown
- Producer: Josh Schroeder

Those Who Fear chronology
Unholy Anger (2013)	Death Sentence (2014)

Unholy Anger is the first studio album from Those Who Fear. Facedown Records released the album on February 5, 2013.

== Critical reception ==
Professional ratings
Review scores
Source	Rating
Cross Rhythms	7/10 squares
HM Magazine	3/5 stars
Indie Vision Music	4/5 stars
Jesus Freak Hideout	3/5 stars

Awarding the album three stars from HM Magazine, Tony D. Bryant states, "Unholy Anger is hard, fast, and everything the industry needs right now." Ian Webber, rating the album a seven out of ten at Cross Rhythms, says, "The quality of recording is first rate, adding excitement and atmosphere, but the unchanging rhythms, predictable breakdowns and lack of inventive spark hold this back from being a very good release. There is a potential here, but we may have to wait for future recordings for it to reveal itself."

Giving the album three stars for Jesus Freak Hideout, Michael Weaver writes, "Unholy Anger isn't bad, but I wouldn't necessarily classify it as 'good' either." Lee Brown, awarding the album four stars by Indie Vision Music, describes, "Those Who Fear bring a nonstop barrage of hardcore laced with bold lyrics and unrelenting conviction. Sonically, they are a potent blend of Living Sacrifice and For Today, with just a touch of In the Midst of Lions. Lyrically, Unholy Anger is an excursion into the depths of theology, yet is highly accessible. It’s easy to see why Facedown was eager to sign TWF".

== Track listing ==
All tracks are written by Those Who Fear, Joe Heidkamp

No.	Title	Length
1.	"Daggermouth"	3:22
2.	"(Un)Holy Anger" (Feat. Carl Schwartz of First Blood)	3:05
3.	"Holy Anger"	4:23
4.	"Leech Life"	3:17
5.	"Burn"	3:32
6.	"Day of Judgement"	2:29
7.	"My Domain"	3:15
8.	"Relentless"	3:49
9.	"Sowers of Discord"	3:49
10.	"Convictions"	3:47
11.	"Colossus"	3:06
Total length:		37:54

== Personnel ==
Those Who Fear

- John Healy - Vocals
- Luke Healy - Guitar
- Trevor Kope - Guitar
- Josh Miller - Drums
- Josh Ziegler - Bass

Additional musicians

- Matthew Honeycut - Vocals
- Carl Schwartz - Guest Vocals on track 2

Production

- Justin Boyd - Photography
- Joe Heidkamp - Composer, Vocal Producer
- Doug High - Pre-Production
- Dave Quiggle - Artwork, Layout, Photography
- Josh Schroeder - Engineer, Mastering, Mixing
