= Dark Skies (album) =

Studio album by Fit for a King
- Released: September 14, 2018
- Recorded: 2018
- Genre: Metalcore
- Length: 38:23
- Label: Solid State
- Producer: Drew Fulk

Fit for a King chronology
| Deathgrip (2016) | Dark Skies (2018) | The Path (2020) |

Singles from Dark Skies
- 1. "Tower of Pain" Released: June 1, 2018; 2. "The Price of Agony" Released: June 29, 2018; 3. "Backbreaker" Released: July 31, 2018; 4. "When Everything Means Nothing" Released: August 10, 2018; 5. "Oblivion" Released: August 24, 2018

Dark Skies is the fifth studio album by American metalcore band Fit for a King. It was released on September 14, 2018, through Solid State Records and is their first album to be produced by Drew Fulk.

== Critical reception ==
Professional ratings
Review scores
| Source | Rating |
|---|---|
| Dead Press! | 8/10 |
| Indie Vision Music | 4/5 stars |
| Jesus Freak Hideout | 4/5 stars |
| KillYourStereo | 85/100 |
| New Noise | 3.5/5 stars |

The album was received highly with mostly positive reviews. Carlos Zelaya from Dead Press! rated the album positively but saying: "You pretty much know what you'll get with Fit For A King, but Dark Skies is certainly the sign of a band that haven't forgotten that the word 'metalcore' contains 'metal'." Indie Vision Music stated that "Fit For A King continues to carve out a piece of metal history for themselves with this impressive album because they really did cover all the bases of what a metal album can bring: brutally heavy, melodic, thrashy, emotional lyrics that range across many topics, and two vocalists who compliment each other endlessly. Dark Skies will be playing in many playlists and shuffles with good reason." Jesus Freak Hideout rated the album 4 out of 5 and said: "Dark Skies may be Fit for a King's fifth studio record, but the energy, passion, and enthusiasm these men have for their craft and ministry has not changed since they entered the scene with Descendants. Despite a couple of minor shortcomings, Dark Skies proves that the band can still hold their own and belt out some earth-shattering tunes while they're at it."

Megan Langley from KillYourStereo gave the album 85 out of 100 and said: "As you can tell, I absolutely loved this new Fit For A King record. It brought quite a bit of variety more than the band's other works, which makes it stand out even more. Especially in the current metalcore scene, I feel. The band brought so many solid, memorable moments throughout all ten of these tracks; providing some incredible performances and a near-perfect mix of aggressive and melodic elements too. Metalcore fan, a Fit For A King fan, or just a lover of heavy music, you gotta check this one out!" New Noise gave the album 3.5 out of 5 and stated: "Nevertheless, Fit for a King have provided another bounty of glorious metalcore with Dark Skies, and fans are likely to rejoice the product; it certainly has power." Stitched Sound praised the album saying, "Throughout the album, the perspective shifts as time passes and they come to a point of self realization and solace."

== Track listing ==
| No. | Title | Length |
|---|---|---|
| 1. | "Engraved" | 4:56 |
| 2. | "The Price of Agony" | 4:47 |
| 3. | "Backbreaker" | 2:50 |
| 4. | "Anthem of the Defeated" | 2:37 |
| 5. | "When Everything Means Nothing" | 3:51 |
| 6. | "Youth | Division" | 4:15 |
| 7. | "Shattered Glass" | 3:34 |
| 8. | "Tower of Pain" | 4:29 |
| 9. | "Debts of the Soul" | 2:38 |
| 10. | "Oblivion" | 4:26 |
| Total length: | | 38:23 |

== Personnel ==
Credits adapted from AllMusic.

Fit for a King

- Ryan Kirby – lead vocals
- Bobby Lynge – guitars, backing vocals
- Ryan "Tuck" O'Leary – bass, clean vocals
- Jared Easterling – drums

Additional personnel

- Drew Fulk – production, engineering, mixing, mastering
- Brandon Ebel – executive production
- Jeff Dunne – mixing, mastering
- Adam Skatula – A&R
- Corinne Alexandra – artwork, design, photography

== Charts ==
| Chart (2018) | Peak position |
|---|---|
| US Billboard 200 | 69 |
| US Top Christian Albums (Billboard) | 2 |
| US Top Hard Rock Albums (Billboard) | 3 |
| US Top Rock Albums (Billboard) | 6 |
