= Crystal Lake (band) =

Japanese metalcore band

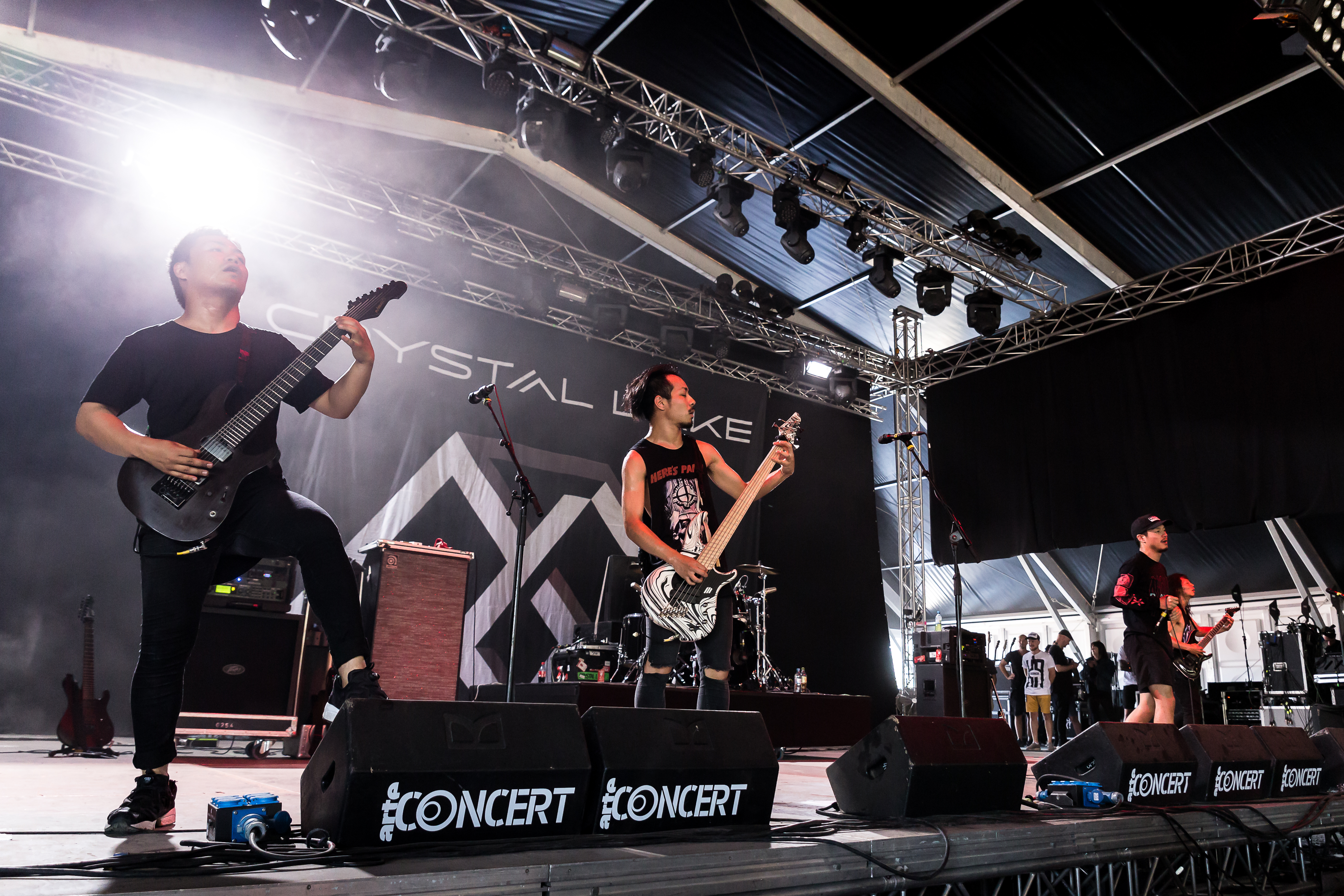
- Crystal Lake performing at Full Force in 2019

Background information
- Origin: Tokyo, Japan
- Genres: Metalcore; progressive metal; nu metal; deathcore
- Years active: 2002–present
- Labels: Blood Axe; Alliance Trax; HGR; Imperium; Halfcut; Shock; Cube; Artery; JPU; SharpTone; Century Media
- Members: PK; Yudai "YD" Miyamoto; Gaku Taura; Mitsuru; Hisatsugu "TJ" Taji
- Past members: Seiji Nagasawa; Kentaro Nishimura; Yusuke Ishihara; Yasuyuki Kotaka; Teruki Takahashi; Shinya Hori; Ryo Kinoshita; John Robert Centorrino
- Website: crystallake.jp

Crystal Lake is a Japanese metalcore band from Tokyo, formed in 2002. The band comprises vocalist PK, guitarists Yudai Miyamoto and Hisatsugu Taji, bassist Mitsuru, and drummer Gaku Taura, who is a former member of Nocturnal Bloodlust. After Shinya Hori's departure, Miyamoto is the only member of the original line-up who remains in the band. Crystal Lake have released five studio albums. Their latest studio album, The Weight of Sound, was released on 23 January 2026.

== History ==
=== Formation and first releases (2002–2005) ===
Crystal Lake was formed in 2002 in Tokyo, Japan. Their first demo, Freewill, was released in February in time for the show in Korea which they were invited to by GMC Records. The second demo, One Word Changes Everything, came out in July, and a self-released four-track EP, also entitled Freewill was released in September with 1000 copies made and sold. In September 2003, Crystal Lake played five shows in Japan with Australian band Day of Contempt.

From March to June 2004, they toured with Loyal to the Grave and Extinguish the Fire. Following the end of the tour, the bands released a split album titled Blood of Judas on CD and DVD.

On 29 April 2005, the band released their second split album with Risen and Unboy titled 3 Way Split. They also toured in Malaysia.

=== Dimension and Taste of Chaos 2007 (2006–2007) ===
In February 2006, they performed at Independence D. On 5 July 2006, the band released their first studio album titled Dimension through Imperium Recordings. After the release of the album, they went on "Dimension Tour" in Japan.

In February 2007, they performed at Metal Presentation with Australian band I Killed the Prom Queen and Hatebreed on "Hatebreed Japan Tour" in March. In November 2007, they played on Rockstar's "Taste of Chaos" in Japan.

=== Third split album and Taste of Chaos 2008 (2008–2009) ===
In May 2008, they released their third split album on CD with the Japanese punk band Cleave. In November 2008, they performed again at Rockstar's "Taste of Chaos" in Japan.

In January 2009, they toured in Japan with Parkway Drive and Shai Hulud.

=== Into the Great Beyond and Nishimura's departure (2010–2011) ===
On 27 May 2010, Crystal Lake released free download demo Endeavor on their MySpace page. Crystal Lake also announced through MySpace, Twitter, Facebook and YouTube a new music video "Twisted Fate" from their upcoming second studio album titled Into the Great Beyond. On 11 June 2011, the founding vocalist Kentaro Nishimura left the band.

=== Line-up change and Cubes (2012–2015) ===
On 24 March 2012, the original drummer Yusuke Ishihara left the band. On 3 July, they announced their new vocalist Ryo Kinoshita on their Facebook page with a statement: "Today, we are pleased to announce the newest addition to the Crystal Lake Family, please give a warm welcome the new vocalist Ryo." The next day, the band announced that Gaku Taura will be their support on drums. They also announced that they were going to release a new single in summer. On 5 September, they released two new singles "The Fire Inside" and "Overcome" which was mixed and mastered by Brian Hood at 456 Recordings.

From 26 January to 1 February 2013, they toured with As Blood Runs Black and Confession. In May 2013, they toured with The Ghost Inside and Continents. After that they shared the stage with Emmure and they toured across Japan on the Sumerian Tour 2013 with Born of Osiris, Upon a Burning Body and Her Name in Blood. Later in 2013, the band went on a supporting tours for Coldrain, Her Name in Blood, Crossfaith, Before My Life Fails, SiM, and Totalfat.

On 9 February 2014, they played at the Scream Out Fest 2014 with The Devil Wears Prada, Periphery, The Word Alive, Fear, and Loathing in Las Vegas, and Her Name in Blood at Shinkiba Studio Coast, Tokyo. On 12 April, they played on the Monster Energy Outburn Tour 2014 with Coldrain, Crossfaith, and Miss May I in Sapporo.

Later in 2014, the band announced that their first EP titled Cubes via YouTube page, is set to release on 6 August 2014. A music video for the new song "Ups & Downs" was released on 28 July. On 4 August, a music video was released for their cover of Limp Bizkit's song "Rollin'". On 6 August, they released the new EP Cubes via Cube Records. Cubes debuted at No. 5 on the Oricon (Japanese music chart) indie weekly album chart, at No. 45 on the weekly album chart and at No. 27 on the daily album chart.

On 8 August, they headlined the "True North Project Tour", with support from Infection, Prompts, Sailing Before the Wind, Scarface, and Shark Ethic. They toured on the Crossfaith's "ACROSS THE FUTURE Tour" with We Came as Romans and While She Sleeps in September. On 25 October, they started their headlining tour "Cubes Tour" 2014. On 15 November, they performed at the Knotfest Japan 2014.

On 3 August 2015, it was announced that bassist Yasuyuki Kotaka had decided to leave the band due to his illness.

=== Signing to Artery Recordings, The Sign and True North (2015–2017) ===
On 7 September 2015, Crystal Lake announced they had signed to Artery Recordings in the U.S. and JPU Records in the UK and Europe and would be releasing their following third studio album The Sign on 7 October 2015 through these labels. On 30 November 2016, Crystal Lake released their fourth studio album True North. They later released two new singles, "Apollo" and "Machina" in 2017.

=== Signing to SharpTone Records and Helix (2018–2019) ===
Crystal Lake released the single and accompanying video for "The Circle" on 6 August 2018. The three-track release for The Circle was released on 8 August.

On 28 November, SharpTone Records announced that they had signed Crystal Lake to the label. The band released a new single and accompanying video for the song "Aeon". On the same day, the band released their fifth studio album, Helix, exclusively in Japan with an international release following in 2019. In 2019, Crystal Lake will support August Burns Red, Miss May I, and Fit for a King on "The Dangerous Tour" in North America. In March, the group went on Adept's Russian Tour as a warm up. They also headlined the 2019 "Never Say Die Tour" with In Hearts Wake, King, Our Hollow Our Home, Polar, Alpha Wolf, and Great American Ghost.

=== The Voyages, departures of Kinoshita and Hori and The Weight of Sound (2020–present) ===
On 8 July 2020, the band released a brand new single titled "Watch Me Burn" and its corresponding music video. On 9 July, a day after the new release, the band announced that the founding rhythm guitarist Shinya Hori would be taking a hiatus for personal reasons.

On 3 August, the band re-released their song "Into the Great Beyond" from their second studio album of the same name alongside an accompanying music video. At the same time, the band announced that an album consisting of re-recorded material from their Kentaro Nishimura era, titled The Voyages, which released on 5 August 2020, while also revealing the album cover and the track list. On 21 November, the band officially announced that Hori's hiatus would become a permanent departure due to "personal reasons".

In July 2021, the band released the single "Curse", accompanied by an official music video for the song, uploaded onto their YouTube channel. Along with the music video, it was announced that touring members Gaku Taura, and Mitsuru were made official members of the band. Along with the addition of a new rhythm guitarist, Hisatsugu "TJ" Taji. On 28 September 2022, Ryo Kinoshita announced that he left the band revealing that he has been dealing with an illness known as adjustment disorder that has made it difficult for him to continue with the group. The illness afflicted Kinoshita over the past five years which made him the decision to step away from the group. On 11 March 2023, Crystal Lake announced that they have recruited John Robert Centorrino formerly of The Last Ten Seconds of Life as their new full-time vocalist. On 23 June, the band unveiled another single "Rebirth" and its corresponding music video.

Crystal Lake's sixth studio album, The Weight of Sound, was released on 23 January 2026.

On 31 March 2026, it was announced Centorrino had left the band in order to focus on his family life and the band would be touring with guest vocalists in the interim whilst they search for a new vocalist. On 21 August 2026, PK from Prompts was announced as their new vocalist.

== Musical style and influences ==
Crystal Lake's musical style has been described as metalcore, progressive metal, nu metal, and deathcore.

Members stated that the band are influenced mostly by metalcore acts such as Shai Hulud, Earth Crisis and Hatebreed as well as other melodic metalcore bands like The Ghost Inside or Parkway Drive.

== Members ==
Current

- Yudai "YD" Miyamoto – lead guitar (2002–present), backing vocals (2012–Current)
- Gaku Taura – drums (2021–present; touring 2012–2021)
- Mitsuru – bass (2021–present; touring 2017–2021)
- Hisatsugu "TJ" Taji – rhythm guitar (2021–present)
- “PK” Kang-hyun Park – lead vocals (2026–present)

Former

- Seiji Nagasawa – bass (2002–2007)
- Kentaro Nishimura – lead vocals (2002–2011)
- Yusuke Ishihara – drums (2002–2012)
- Yasuyuki Kotaka – bass (2007–2015)
- Teruki Takahashi – bass (2015–2016)
- Shinya Hori – rhythm guitar (2002–2020)
- Ryo Kinoshita – lead vocals (2012–2022)
- John Robert Centorrino – lead vocals (2023–2026)

Former touring musicians

- Bitoku Sakamoto – bass (2015, 2016–2018, 2023)
- Myke Terry – lead vocals (2026)

Timeline

== Discography ==
=== Studio albums ===
List of studio albums, with selected chart positions
Title	Album details	Peak chart positions	
Title	Album details	JPN Oricon	JPN Billboard
Dimension	Released: 5 July 2006; Label: Imperium Recordings; Format: CD	—	—
Into the Great Beyond	Released: 3 November 2010; Label: Imperium Recordings; Format: CD	—	—
The Sign	Released: 7 October 2015; Label: Cube Records (JPN); Artery Recordings (US); JPU Records (EU); Halfcut Records & Shock Records (AUS); Formats: CD, LP, digital download	36	32
True North	Released: 30 November 2016 (JPN); 2 December 2016 (NA, UK, EU); Label: Cube Records (JPN); Artery Recordings (US); Formats: CD, LP, digital download	39	37
Helix	Released: 28 November 2018 (JPN); 15 February 2019 (NA, UK, EU); Label: Cube Records (JPN); SharpTone Records (US); Formats: CD, LP, digital download	23	19
The Weight of Sound	Released: 23 January 2026; Label: Century Media Records (US); Formats: CD, LP, digital download	—	—
"—" denotes items which did not chart.

=== Extended plays ===
List of extended plays, with selected chart positions
Title	EP details	Peak chart positions	
Title	EP details	JPN Oricon	JPN Billboard
Cubes	Released: 6 August 2014; Label: Cube Records; Formats: CD, LP, digital download	45	40

=== Split albums ===
List of split albums
Title	Album details
Blood of Judas (with Extinguish the Fire, Loyal to the Grave)	Released: 30 October 2004; Label: Blood Axe; Format: CD
3 Way Split (with Risen, Unboy)	Released: 29 April 2005; Label: Alliance Trax; Format: CD
Crystal Lake / Cleave (with Cleave)	Released: 24 May 2008; Label: HGR; Format: CD
Eclipse (with Survive Said the Prophet)	Released: 18 May 2018; Label: Cube Records; Format: CD

=== Compilation albums ===
Title	Album details	Peak chart positions	
Title	Album details	JPN Oricon	JPN Billboard
The Voyages	Released: 5 August 2020; Label: Cube Records (JPN); SharpTone Records (US); Formats: CD, LP, digital download	40	33
"—" denotes items which did not chart.

=== Singles ===
List of singles, with selected chart positions
Title	Year	Peak positions	Album
Title	Year	JPN Oricon	Album
"The Fire Inside / Overcome"	2012	—	Non-album singles
"Prometheus"	2015	—	The Sign
"Apollo"	2017	26	Helix
"The Circle"	2018	44	Non-album singles
"Watch Me Burn"	2020	12	Non-album singles
"Curse"	2021	50	Non-album singles
"Denial / Rebirth"	2023	—	Non-album singles
"DYSTOPIA"	2023	—	Non-album singles
"BlüdGod"	2024	—	The Weight of Sound
"Chase The Sky"	2024	—	Non-album singles
"Crossing Nails"	2025	—	The Weight of Sound
"The Weight of Sound"	2025	—	The Weight of Sound
"—" denotes items which did not chart.

=== Collaborations ===
Year	Song	Album	Album artist
2012	"Accept Your Fate Now" (featuring Ryo Kinoshita)	Seated with Liquor	Draw the Emotional & Foreground Eclipse
2013	"Icons" (featuring Ryo Kinoshita)	(For)Lorn (フォーローン)	Before My Life Fails
2013	"Superhate" (featuring Ryo Kinoshita)	Storm Chaser	Translations
2015	"Monster" (featuring Ryo Kinoshita)	Magna Carta	Swanky Dank
2015	"Neo Khaos" (featuring Ryo Kinoshita)	Neo Tokyo Rave Style	DJ Baku
2016	"Back to Zero" (featuring Ryo Kinoshita)	Coexistence	Breakdown of Sanity
2016	"Spectrum" (featuring Ryo Kinoshita)	Fixed	Survive Said the Prophet
2017	"Solace" (featuring Ryo Kinoshita)	Ambivalence	End These Days
2017	"Kingsglaive" (featuring Ryo Kinoshita)	Non-album single	Scintilla
2017	"Dreamscape" (featuring Crystal Lake)	Dreamscape	PhaseOne
2018	"Angelwrath" (featuring Ryo Kinoshita)	Spirit Vessel	A Scent Like Wolves
2019	"Deathwatch" (featuring Ryo Kinoshita)	Deathwatch	The Royal
2019	"Atmosphere" (featuring Ryo Kinoshita)	Damaged Souls	Awake the Dreamer
2019	"Mayday" (featuring Ryo Kinoshita)	The Side Effects	Coldrain
2020	"Yōkai" (featuring Ryo Kinoshita)	Yōkai	Within Destruction
2020	"God of Fire" (featuring Ryo Kinoshita)	The Path	Fit for a King
2020	"Agnes" (featuring Ryo Kinoshita)	Non-album single	Hills Have Eyes
2020	"Holy Roller" (new version; featuring Ryo Kinoshita)	Eternal Blue	Spiritbox
2020	"Cibus" (featuring Ryo Kinoshita)	Metempsychosis	Dexcore
2021	"Remember Me" (featuring Ryo Kinoshita)	Burn in the Flood	Our Hollow, Our Home
2022	"The Abyss" (featuring Ryo Kinoshita)	Oceans	Esprit D'Air
2022	"Demon King" (new version; featuring Ryo Kinoshita)	Non-album single	Brand of Sacrifice
2022	"Ronin" (featuring Ryo Kinoshita)	Trinity	The Gloom in the Corner

=== Other appearances ===
==== Music videos ====
Year	Song	Artist	Director	Link
2020	"Baseball Bat"	SiM	Inni Vision	
