= Dimlight =

Greek symphonic metal band

- Origin: Athens, Greece
- Genre: Symphonic death metal
- Years active: 2006–present
- Labels: Emotion Art Ltd, Five Starr Records, Sliptrick Records
- Members: Peter Invoker; Nikolas Perlepe; Mora Hecate; Jim Lan; Apostolis; Marios koutsoukos
- Past members: Sanna Salou; Eva Fourlanou; Efthimis Papanikos; Andy; Peter; Daffy

Dimlight is a Greek symphonic metal band. The band formed in 2006 and is based in Athens, Greece Dimlight have toured extensively in Europe and the Middle East.

== History ==
=== Forming and debut album: Obtenebration (2009) ===
Dimlight was formed in early 2006 by Peter Miliadis and Efhimis Papanikos. Although the band was formed in 2006 it was almost three years before they released their first full-length album called Obtenebration under the label Emotion Art Ltd. The album was recorded at Baseline studios, got mixed by Spiros Aspiotis and mastered in Tailor Maid Studio by Peter In de Betou in Sweden.

=== Psychosynthesis (2012), Death of Efthimis, Departure of Sanna and New Vocalist ===
Around mid-2010, Dimlight started working on new material and in 2012 released their second studio album called Psychosynthesis. The album was recorded at Dimlight personal studio, mixed by Fotis Benardo (SepticFlesh) and mastered in Tailor Maid Studio by Peter in de Betou. Among the guests of the album were Seth Siro Anton (SepticFlesh), Ilianna Tsakiraki, (Enemy of Reality, ex-Meden Agan) and Stelios Mavromitis (ex-Astarte, ex-SepticFlesh). The band’s success brought on an invitation to be in the lineup of one of the biggest metal festivals in Europe, the Metal Female Voices Festival (MFVF) on its tenth anniversary in 2012. The band’s desire for new music did not allow them to remain stagnant and in the same year they started working on their third album. In August 2014, the main singer Sanna Salou left the band and Eva Fourlanou replaced her.

=== The Lost Chapters (2015) ===
In December 2015 the band established collaboration with Sliptrick Records and released their third album The Lost Chapters. The album was recorded at Soundflakes studios and is both mixed and mastered by John Mcris and written by Marios koutsoukos. Among the guests on the album are Jean Baptiste (Randomwalk), Maya (Meden Agan), Maria-Melissanthi Routi (Kinetic), and Alfred Shtuni. The cover of "The Lost Chapters" was made by Pierre-Alain D. // 3mmi Design. Afterwards Dimlight went on stages opened for Draconian in Greece, and headlined Blast Night Vol.2 in Dubai, and performed in Metal Blast Festival (Egypt) in Cairo.

=== Kingdom of Horrors and Realm of Tragedy (2018) ===
2017 witnessed the band touring in the Middle East, playing in Jordan and Lebanon and also in India, They announced in late March 2018 that they are working on a new album (The Kingdom of Horrors).

On the 27th of October, 2018 The band released Kingdom of Horrors and Realm of Tragedy in Metal Blast festival concert's latest Edition (Egypt).

== Members ==
Current members

- Peter Invoker - guitar (2006–present)
- Nikolas Perlepe - guitar/bass (2009–present)
- Mora Hecate - vocals (2018–present)
- Jim - drums (2013–present)
- Marios - lyricist (2015–present)
- Apostolis - keyboards (2018–present)

Former members

- Sanna Salou - vocals (2006–2014)
- Eva Forlanou - vocals (2014–2018)
- Daffy - drums (2006-2009)
- Efthimis Papanikos - bass (2006-2013)
- Andy - drums (2006–2012)
- Peter -drums (2012)
- Darien - keyboards (2006–2010)- orchestra (2010–2016)

== Discography ==
=== Albums ===
- Obtenebration (2009)
- Psychosynthesis (2012)
- The lost chapter (2015)
- Kingdom of Horrors (2018)
- Realm of Tragedy (2018)
- A Symphony Of Horrors (2019)

=== Singles ===
- R.I.D (2008)
- Cardinal Sins "Live Video" (2012)
- Invoking the Hunter (2015)
- The Red King (2018)
