= Curimus =

Finnish death metal band

- Origin: Loimaa, Finland
- Genres: Thrash metal, death metal
- Years active: 2004–present
- Label: Freezing Penguin
- Members: Marko Silvennoinen – vocals (2005–present) Tommi Ahlroth – guitars (2016–present); Juho Manninen – bass (2005–present) Jari Nieminen – drums (2009–present)
- Website: http://www.curimus.net

Curimus is a Finnish thrash / death metal band formed in 2004.

== History ==
The original line-up included Juha-Matti Helmi (guitar), Jucca Ääri (drums) and Jarno Ääri (bass). Marko Silvennoinen (vocals) joined the band in the same year. The first demo was released in 2006. It included the song "Fatal Belief" which was also released as a music video. Juho Manninen replaced Jarno Ääri and the second demo Under My Skin was released in 2008. The line-up stayed the same until 2009. After the release of third demo Humanity... for Sale Jari Nieminen joined the band replacing Jucca Ääri. The fourth demo Values was released in 2010. Imperiumi.net gave the EP 5/5 point, certifying it as a "demo of the month".

On February 22, 2012 Curimus released their first full-length album, Realization, via their own label Freezing Penguin, distributed by Inverse Records. The album hit the charts in its release week at position 6 in record store list and position 29 on Musiikkituottajat's chart.

On April 25, 2014 band released their second album Artificial Revolution, again by their own label, but this time distributed by Svart Records. This album preceded the digital singles "Preachings" (including guest vocals by Aleksi Hahko) and "Reincarnation", which was also released as a music video by Esa Jussila and Artturi Rostén.

Curimus has always been an active tour band. During its career they have played over 100 shows in Finland, Russia and Estonia. Curimus is also known for their media raptures. In 2012 they gave away free condoms. On the package, the band posed completely naked, only instruments covering their private parts.

== Discography ==
- Promo (demo, 2006)
- Under My Skin (demo, 2008)
- Humanity... for Sale! (demo, 2009)
- Realization (2012), Freezing Penguin
- Values (demo, 2014)
- Artificial Revolution (2014), Freezing Penguin
- Garden of Eden (2020), Inverse Records

== Members ==
Current

- Marko Silvennoinen – vocals (2004–present)
- Tommi Ahlroth – guitars (2016–present)
- Juho Manninen – bass (2005–present)
- Jari Nieminen – drums (2009–present)

Former

- Juha-Matti Helmi – guitars (2004–2016)
- Jarno Ääri – bass (2004–2005)
- Jucca Ääri – drums (2004–2009)
