= Deathgrip (album) =

Studio album by Fit for a King
- Released: October 7, 2016
- Recorded: 2016
- Studios: 37 Studios, Rochester Hills, Michigan, U.S.
- Genre: Metalcore
- Length: 36:33
- Label: Solid State
- Producers: Nick Sampson; Bobby Lynge

Fit for a King chronology
Slave to Nothing (2014)	Deathgrip (2016)	Dark Skies (2018)

Singles from Deathgrip
- 1. "Pissed Off" Released: August 17, 2016; 2. "Cold Room" Released: September 1, 2016; 3. "Shadows & Echoes" Released: September 8, 2016; 4. "Dead Memory" Released: September 22, 2016

Deathgrip is the fourth studio album by American metalcore band Fit for a King. It was released on October 7, 2016, through Solid State Records. It was produced by Nick Sampson and Bobby Lynge.

== Composition ==
=== Themes ===
The song "Pissed Off" was written after the band was scheduled to play a show with Eagles of Death Metal when the November 2015 Paris attacks occurred.

== Critical reception ==
Professional ratings
Review scores
Source	Rating
HM	4/5 stars
Indie Vision Music	4/5 stars
Jesus Freak Hideout	4.5/5 stars 3.5/5 stars
Metal Injection	8/10
New Noise	4.5/5 stars
New Trascendence	9/10
Sound Fiction	8/10

Natasha Van Duser of New Noise wrote "The only real flaw of Deathgrip is that it leaves the listener wanting more, which isn't a bad thing, but it would be interesting to see a more experimental sound come from the band on a song or two in the future. Fit For A King's obvious ability to layer a record with an ever growing range of styles is the highlight of this album as a whole, and their keen eye for detailing in song structure is definitely their biggest strength. If you're looking for a heavy album that has a lot of instrumental dynamics and vocal value, then Deathgrip is the perfect solution."

Sound Fiction said "Overall Deathgrip is a massive triumph as Fit For A King takes every successful element of their previous records and combines it all on this one. Whether you are a fan of massive breakdowns, bouncy riffs, metalcore one liners or melodic choruses, this album will not disappoint. Fit For A King are poised to make big waves with Deathgrip, so be sure to keep your eye on the band in years to come." Nick Abela of Metal Injection reports "All in all Deathgrip is a solid release. It's the same style of music that Fit For A King has been writing for half of a decade now but better. The breakdowns, the riffs, the drumming, the clean vocals to the entire feel of the whole record is a great example of how metalcore is still alive and well in 2016. Though there are a few less surprises than anticipated with the album there are still some moments that are unexpected and makes it a record that you can find yourself listening to more than once."

Connor Welsh of New Transcendence wrote "Previous efforts from Fit for a King were varying shades of solid—engaging, catchy and aggressive, but all plagued by errant monotony that made each release wear thin rather quickly. Deathgrip does away with that—stripping out some of the more superfluous aspects of the band's dynamic to give a raw, relentless display of comprehensive metal-turned-hardcore mastery that demands to be acknowledged. With dissonant, downtuned bruisers like 'Stacking Bodies' to send mosh pits into full-swing contrasted by more emotionally riveting songs like 'Cold Room', telling the story of the death of a child and the struggle to feel complete as a parent thereafter, Deathgrip devastates with its heaviness, but also does a number on the listener's emotional sensibilities as well. Fit for a King are as furious as we've ever heard them—but ten times more mature, energetic, dynamic and explosive, making Deathgrip an album that, after years of growth, is truly fit for a king." Randy Shatkowski of Antihero Magazine replied "As an album, Deathgrip isn't perfect. It's familiar, often too familiar. When that's the only noticeable problem with an album this strong, though, that familiarity is easily forgivable. The long and short of it is, yes, a couple tracks here are weak, but more than twice that many songs are highlights, not just of the album, or even the band, but the genre as a whole. That's worth a little filler."

Lucas Munachen of Jesus Freak Hideout wrote "Deathgrip just does everything right. It's not only heavy, but incredibly engaging, choosing to keep the dynamics interesting rather than monotonous, something previous releases too often fell claim to. It's a powerful result of continued dedication and commitment, and one the band should be immensely proud of. Admitting its thematic content may deter more sensitive listeners, Deathgrip deserves nothing but praise.", while Scott Fryberger also of Jesus Freak Hideout wrote "Lots of heavy riffs, guttural growls, and breakdowns; these things are fine, and I'm sure they make for an excellent and engaging live show, but they don't help my waning interest in heavy music." Finally, Philip Trapp of HM stated "Few are truly ready for death's grip, yet we'll all feel it eventually as dust always returns to the earth. Something can be said for not fearing those who kill the body — as ISIL did in Paris last year — since they cannot kill the soul. Fit for a King knows this. Still, those may seem futile words for the families of those who lost their lives at the hands of terrorists. Alongside FFAK, we should all be pissed off at it. Are we ready?" Mason Beard of Indie Vision Music wrote "Overall, it's a slamming record. If you are into heavy and melodic music, go buy this thing. Amazing music!"

== Track listing ==
No.	Title	Length
1.	"The End's Beginning"	0:48
2.	"Pissed Off"	3:31
3.	"Dead Memory" (featuring Jake Luhrs of August Burns Red)	4:13
4.	"Cold Room"	2:51
5.	"Disease"	3:31
6.	"Shadows & Echoes"	3:46
7.	"More Than Nameless"	3:13
8.	"We Are All Lost"	4:07
9.	"Unclaimed, Unloved"	3:00
10.	"Stacking Bodies" (featuring Levi Benton of Miss May I)	3:13
11.	"Deathgrip"	4:14
Total length:		36:33

== Personnel ==
Credits adapted from AllMusic.

Fit for a King

- Ryan Kirby – lead vocals
- Bobby Lynge – guitars, backing vocals, production
- Ryan "Tuck" O'Leary – bass, clean vocals
- Jared Easterling – drums

Additional musicians

- Jake Luhrs of August Burns Red – guest vocals on track 3, "Dead Memory"
- Levi Benton of Miss May I – guest vocals on track 10, "Stacking Bodies"

Additional personnel

- Nick Sampson – production, engineering, mixing, mastering
- Brandon Ebel – executive production
- Cory Hajde and Shawn Carrano – management
- Adam Skatula – A&R
- Corinne Alexandra – artwork, design

== Charts ==
Chart (2016)	Peak position
US Billboard 200	71
US Top Christian Albums (Billboard)	2
US Top Hard Rock Albums (Billboard)	5
US Top Rock Albums (Billboard)	18
