= The Path (Fit for a King album) =

Studio album by Fit for a King
- Released: September 18, 2020
- Recorded: 2020
- Genre: Metalcore
- Length: 35:33
- Label: Solid State
- Producer: Drew Fulk

Fit for a King chronology
Dark Skies (2018)	The Path (2020)	The Hell We Create (2022)

Singles from The Path
- 1. "Breaking the Mirror" Released: March 13, 2020; 2. "God of Fire" Released: July 10, 2020; 3. "Locked (In My Head)" Released: August 6, 2020; 4. "Annihilation" Released: August 28, 2020

The Path is the sixth studio album by American metalcore band Fit for a King. It was released on September 18, 2020, through Solid State Records and was produced by Drew Fulk. It is the band's first release with guitarist Daniel Gailey. It is also the last album to feature the band's founding drummer Jared Easterling before he left the band in December 2021.

== Background and promotion ==
On March 13, 2020, the band unveiled a new single titled "Breaking the Mirror" along with an accompanying lyric video. On July 8, the band announced the album itself, the album cover, the track list, and release date. On July 10, the band released the second single "God of Fire" featuring Ryo Kinoshita of Crystal Lake.

On August 6, the band released the third single "Locked (In My Head)". On August 25, the band teased on their social media accounts that the fourth and final single titled "Annihilation" would be released on August 28. On that day, three weeks before the album release, the band released the single. On September 18, the day of the album release, the band released a music video for the title track.

== Critical reception ==
Professional ratings
Review scores
Source	Rating
AllMusic	4/5 stars
CaliberTV	7/10
Dead Press!	8/10
Distorted Sound	7/10
Jesus Freak Hideout	4/5 stars
Kerrang!	3/5 stars
Rock 'N' Load	8/10
Wall of Sound	8.5/10

The album received positive reviews from critics. AllMusic gave the album a positive review saying, "Setting fire to the landscape, Texan metalcore outfit Fit for a King take a scorched approach to their brutal sixth set, The Path." CaliberTV scored the album 7 out of 10 and said: "Fit for a King are on to greener pastures and, undoubtedly, tomorrow's answer to a Killswitch Engage or As I Lay Dying. While certainly a deserved title, don't be fooled by this album's lofty aspirations. Fit for a King earned this by being the most consistent band in their genre. The Path does nothing to tarnish that fact." Damon Taylor from Dead Press! rated the album positively and saying: "With The Path, Fit for a King show a band prepared and evidently ready to move towards a more grand and stadium ready sound. With the tracks to back up their ambitions, they're well on their way towards the front of the metalcore pack." Distorted Sound scored the album 7 out of 10 and said: "The Path may be well-worn but it's worth taking all the same. FIT FOR A KING don't do originality, but they write great songs and some of these cuts will be stuck in your head for days. They're very easy to like too and it'll only take a couple of spins before the hooks are dug in deep. This is refined, professional and if you can make it to the end without wanting to find a stage to jump off, you're made of stronger stuff than us."

Jesus Freak Hideout rated the album 4 out of 5 and said: "Dark Skies was the sound of a band perfecting music they were comfortable with. By departing somewhat from their former sound, The Path ushers in moments that just don't fit as well (e.g., parts of 'God of Fire' or 'Vendetta') and, consequently, misses on the cohesion that Dark Skies had. But overall, the band plays their music well, and the variety is a welcome addition. Even on their new path, Fit for a King shows they have the ability to travel it well." Kerrang! gave the album 3 out of 5 and stated: "Fit for a King are one of those bands who always seem to be just… there. The Path is their sixth album in a decade, and they've never been less than consistent and highly effective. Despite this, they've never really made that step up to modern metal's top table. The Path, however, is the sound of a band making a big, energised effort to change all that." Rock 'N' Load praised the album saying, "The Path is full of all the aspects that make enjoyable Metalcore, from the soaring vocals to the shattering breakdowns, you will be testing your lung capacity whilst joining in with the vocals and then smashing anything in range as the drums pick up and the pit becomes chaotic with the heavy aspects. There is no denying that The Path will continue the popularity of Fit for a King and should push them to the next level." Wall of Sound gave the album a score 8.5/10 and saying: "Fit for a King continuously manage to impress fans all over the globe, including myself by using what works for them musically and improving on that sound. Hopefully, they will be down under again soon, but until then, playing this album on repeat is almost just as good."

== Track listing ==
Adapted from Apple Music.

The Path track listing
No.	Title	Length
1.	"The Face of Hate"	3:41
2.	"Breaking the Mirror"	3:34
3.	"Annihilation"	3:10
4.	"The Path"	4:07
5.	"Prophet"	4:17
6.	"Locked (In My Head)"	3:06
7.	"God of Fire" (featuring Ryo Kinoshita of Crystal Lake)	3:30
8.	"Stockholm"	2:30
9.	"Louder Voice"	4:31
10.	"Vendetta"	3:07
Total length:		35:33

== Personnel ==
Credits adapted from Discogs.

Fit for a King

- Ryan Kirby – lead vocals
- Bobby Lynge – guitars, backing vocals
- Daniel Gailey – guitars, backing vocals
- Ryan "Tuck" O'Leary – bass, vocals
- Jared Easterling – drums

Additional musicians

- Ryo Kinoshita of Crystal Lake – guest vocals on track 7

Additional personnel

- Drew Fulk – production, engineering, mixing, mastering, composition
- Brandon Ebel – executive production
- Jeff Dunne – engineering, mixing, mastering
- Taylor Kimball – engineering
- Cory Hajde – management
- Matt Anderson – booking
- Adam Skatula – A&R
- Corinne Alexandra – artwork, design, photography

== Charts ==
Chart performance for The Path
Chart (2020)	Peak position
German Albums (Offizielle Top 100)	70
US Billboard 200	70
US Top Christian Albums (Billboard)	1
US Top Hard Rock Albums (Billboard)	2
US Top Rock Albums (Billboard)	6
