= Descendants (Fit for a King album) =

Studio album by Fit for a King
- Released: September 23, 2011
- Studios: Chango Studios, Lake Mary, Florida, U.S.; Planet Red Studios, Richmond, Virginia (redux)
- Genre: Metalcore
- Length: 37:02; 39:07 (redux)
- Labels: Independent; Solid State (redux)
- Producers: Cameron Mizell; Andreas Magnusson (redux)

Fit for a King chronology
| Awaken the Vesper (2009) | Descendants (2011) | Creation/Destruction (2013) |

Singles from Descendants
- 1. "Ancient Waters" Released: September 16, 2011; 2. "Keep Me Alive" Released: November 21, 2013

Redux album cover
- Artwork used for the redux album cover.

Descendants is the debut studio album by American metalcore band Fit for a King. It was released on September 23, 2011, independently by the band and was produced by Cameron Mizell. The album was re-released on November 25, 2013, through Solid State Records and was produced by Andreas Magnusson. The re-release has new tracklist, all written and performed by the band including a new artwork.

== Critical reception ==
Professional ratings
Review scores
| Source | Rating |
|---|---|
| HM | 4/5 stars |
| Indie Vision Music | 4/5 stars |
| Jesus Freak Hideout | 3.5/5 stars |
| New Transcendence | 5/5 stars |

The original and the redux version of the album both received mostly positive reviews from critics. HM rated the album 4 out of 5 and said: "Overall, the album is a great one with some really catchy, heavy tracks, and anyone who only recently discovered the band and didn't know about their debut would do well to jump in and grab the Descendants reissue. I like things to be a bit more raw with my metal, but I can also appreciate the new level of production on the new record." Indie Vision Music stated that "In this scenario, Fit For A King accomplished exactly what they were looking to with the re-release of Descendants. While there are a few changes I did not care for, the majority of them are for the best, making 'Redux' worthy of a listen." Jesus Freak Hideout rated the album 3.5 out of 5 and said: "Overall, Descendants feels like a more structured project than Creation/Destruction, but lacks something that made Creation/Destruction stand out. I'm not sure if the more Christ-centered lyrics featured here that were absent on their debut made an impact, or if the over-polished production took a toll on my opinion after awhile, but Descendants, on its own, is a good metalcore album. But when stacked up against Creation/Destruction, it just falls short." New Transcendence praised the album saying, "This has been an absolutely fun album to review and I'm so stoked for everyone to hear it. In today's music scene, 'generic' is thrown out alot [sic] about bands, and to some, this album may seem just that way. But what DOES separate the band from others is they have the experience and the live show to back up their product. I am proud to say I've seen the band live numerous times! I want to say thank you to Cory Hadje for allowing The Transcendence to review this amazing record, and for the bands amazing efforts, I give this album an outstanding 5 out of 5 stars!"

== Track listing ==
| No. | Title | Length |
|---|---|---|
| 1. | "Il Diluvio" | 0:28 |
| 2. | "Ancient Waters" | 3:51 |
| 3. | "Buried" | 3:52 |
| 4. | "Parallels" (featuring Jeremy Gray of Ivoryline) | 3:19 |
| 5. | "The Architect" (featuring Matty Mullins of Memphis May Fire) | 3:41 |
| 6. | "Descendants" | 2:21 |
| 7. | "Hollow Eyes" | 3:29 |
| 8. | "The Roots Within" | 2:54 |
| 9. | "The Faint, the Desolate" | 2:02 |
| 10. | "Messenger, Messenger" | 3:02 |
| 11. | "A Love That Transcends Understanding" | 3:03 |
| 12. | "Unchanging" | 4:58 |
| Total length: | | 37:02 |

Redux edition
| No. | Title | Length |
|---|---|---|
| 1. | "Il Diluvio" | 0:29 |
| 2. | "Ancient Waters" | 3:55 |
| 3. | "Buried" | 3:55 |
| 4. | "Parallels" (featuring Jeremy Gray of Ivoryline) | 3:15 |
| 5. | "The Architect" (featuring Matty Mullins of Memphis May Fire) | 3:38 |
| 6. | "Descendants" | 2:20 |
| 7. | "Hollow Eyes" | 3:24 |
| 8. | "The Roots Within" | 2:35 |
| 9. | "Messenger, Messenger" | 3:03 |
| 10. | "Transcend" | 4:09 |
| 11. | "Unchanging" | 4:44 |
| 12. | "Keep Me Alive" | 3:36 |
| Total length: | | 39:07 |

== Personnel ==
=== Original version ===
Fit for a King

- Ryan Kirby – unclean vocals
- Bobby Lynge – guitars, backing vocals
- Justin Hamra – guitars
- Aaron Decur – bass
- Jared Easterling – drums, clean vocals

Additional musicians

- Jeremy Gray of Ivoryline – guest vocals on track 4
- Matty Mullins of Memphis May Fire – guest vocals on track 5

Additional personnel

- Cameron Mizell – production, engineering, mixing, mastering

=== Redux version ===
Credits for the redux edition adapted from AllMusic.

Fit for a King

- Ryan Kirby – unclean vocals
- Bobby Lynge – guitars, backing vocals
- Aaron "Olan" Kadura – bass, clean vocals
- Jared Easterling – drums, clean vocals

Additional musicians

- Jeremy Gray of Ivoryline – guest vocals on track 4
- Matty Mullins of Memphis May Fire – guest vocals on track 5

Additional personnel

- Andreas Magnusson – production, engineering, mixing
- Brandon Ebel – executive production
- Troy Glessner – mastering
- Adam Skatula – A&R
- Phill Mamula – art direction, design

== Charts ==
Redux edition

| Chart (2013) | Peak position |
|---|---|
| US Top Christian Albums (Billboard) | 38 |
| US Heatseekers Albums (Billboard) | 8 |
