= Sliptrick Records =

International independent record label

- Founded: 2007
- Genre: Hard rock, heavy metal, death metal, black metal & more
- Country of origin: Italy
- Location: Liepāja, Latvia
- Official website: sliptrickrecords.com

Sliptrick Records is an independent record label specializing in music genres such as Heavy metal, Hard rock, Death Metal, Black Metal, Metalcore (see "genres" below)... The label is international but currently based in Liepāja, Latvia. Notable acts released through Sliptrick Records include Veonity, Slot, Saber Tiger, Louna, Angelseed, Doll$Boxx (US Release only) and Lovebites (US Release only). The label operates under the umbrella organisation entitled The Dead Pulse group which comprises Sliptrick Records, Alternate Records and Go Loud Agency (booking)

== History ==
Started primarily by Carlo Muselli (who talked about Sliptrick Records in Infrared Magazine) looking to promote Italian rock music to an international audience, the label quickly grew from its humble beginnings of 15-20 hard-core rock and punk bands to over 150 separate releases from acts around the world in 2017 alone. Initially, Sliptrick Records was originally based in Italy but moved its base to Latvia in 2011 and their current headquarters is located in the heart of Liepāja. In recent years the label has branched out and now also operates as a multimedia company, which, apart from the record label incorporates, stock market trading, real estate and a motorcycle racing and custom shop.

In 2017, the label backed and help promote a festival specializing in Latvian rock acts entitled, Rockin’ Liepaja 2017

In 2018, Sliptrick Records celebrated its 10-year jubilee with various concerts around the world. There were also numerous interviews (e.g. the world famous Decibel) and articles spotlighting the label and its achievements.

== Genres ==
Heavy metal, Hard rock, Death Metal, Black Metal, Metalcore, Progressive, Djent, Punk rock, Thrash, Alternative rock, Grindcore, Extreme Metal, Industrial Metal, Hardcore

== Artists ==
Sliptrick Records has released albums by the following artists:

- Alberto Rigoni (IT)
- Aria (RUS)
- Aztlan (MX)
- Bad Bones (IT)
- Crowdown (AUT)
- Curimus (FIN)
- Dark Mirror Ov Tragedy (KOR)
- Dimlight (GR)
- Doll$Boxx (JP)
- [ GIA G. (USA)
- Gangs Of Old Ladies (AUS)
- Gory Blister (IT)
- Haerdsmaelta (SE)
- In My Embrace (SE)
- Ironthorn (IT)
- Lapsus Dei (CL)
- Lecks Inc. (FR)
- Louna (RUS)
- Luke Fortini (IT)
- Kill All The Gentlemen (UK)
- King Kaos (US)
- Mary's Blood (JP)
- Michele Rizzi (IT)
- Neid (IT)
- Lovebites (JP)
- Precipitation (DE)
- Project Silence (FI)
- Residual Self (US)
- Resolution 13 (FI)
- Saber Tiger (JP)
- sickOmania (DK)
- Slot (RUS)
- Steel Cage (IT)
- Stratuz (VE)
- Sinezamia (IT)
- The Same River (GK)
- Varang Nord (LV)
- Veonity (SE)
- Xaon (CHE)
