= Those Who Fear =

American Christian metal band

- Origin: Pittsburgh, Pennsylvania
- Genres: Christian metal, metalcore
- Years active: 2005–2017
- Labels: Facedown
- Members: John Healy; Luke Healy; Jacob Wilder; Caleb DeRusha
- Past members: Scott Buechner; Josh Miller; Trevor Kope; Josh Ziegler; Mike Headley

Those Who Fear, also known as TWF, was an American Christian metal band hailing from Pittsburgh, Pennsylvania, who were established in 2005. The groups' current label imprint is Facedown Records. In 2013, the band came out with a studio album called Unholy Anger. Their second studio album was issued in 2014, titled Death Sentence. Their third and final album, State of Mind, was released in 2016.

== Background ==
In 2005, the band started in Pittsburgh, Pennsylvania with core members: vocalist John Healy and their two lead guitarists, Luke Healy and Trevor Kope. However, the group have gone through many membership changes. At first, the outfit included bassist Scott Buechner, who left the group after Legacy extended play was released. Two new members were added: drummer Josh Miller and bassist replacement Josh Ziegler. The outfit went through a change again prior to Death Sentence being released with Jacob Wilder replacing the departed Josh Miller on drums. Also, bassist Josh Ziegler left the band, then returned later that year. The band released their third album, State of Mind on December 9, 2016. The band performed their final show at Facedown Fest 2017.

== Music history ==
The outfit released a demo project in 2009 with S.O.T.S and it eventually lead to their independently released extended play called Legacy. This got the attention of Facedown Records, who signed the band before the release of Unholy Anger in 2013 making it their first studio album. Just a little over a year later, the band released the second studio album titled Death Sentence. The album had some prowess on a few Billboard charts and those were the Christian Albums and Heatseekers Albums.

== Style ==
Sources have put their music into various genres, everything from deathcore and metalcore to nu metal and hardcore punk. At its core, the music is Christian metal for its sacred elements and heavy metal in its overall sound.

== Members ==
=== Final lineup ===
- John Healy – lead vocals (2005–2017)
- Luke Healy – lead guitar (2005–2017)
- Josh Ziegler – bass (2012–2013, 2014–2017)
- Caleb DeRusha – rhythm guitar (2014–2017)
- Jacob Wilder – drums (2014–2017)

=== Former members ===
- Scott Buechner – bass (2005–2012)
- Mike Headly – bass
- Josh Miller – drums (2005–2014)
- Trevor Kope – rhythm guitar (2005–2014)

== Discography ==
=== Studio albums ===
List of studio albums, with selected chart positions
Title	Album details	Peak chart positions	
Title	Album details	US Christ	US Heat
Unholy Anger	Released: February 5, 2013; Label: Facedown Records; CD, digital download	—	—
Death Sentence	Released: June 24, 2014; Label: Facedown Records; CD, digital download	19	19
State of Mind	Released: December 9, 2016; Label: Facedown Records; CD, Digital download	—	—

=== EPs ===
- Legacy (2011, independent)

=== Demos ===
- S.O.T.S. (2009)

=== Singles ===
- "Ten Years" (2016)
- "Driven" (2016)
