= Convictions (band) =

American Christian metal band

- Origin: Fremont, Ohio, U.S.
- Genres: Metalcore, Christian metal
- Years active: 2012–present
- Label: InVogue
- Members: Michael Felker; Zach Schwochow; Patrick Shekut; Quinton Dreier
- Past members: Justin McGough; Dan Gardner; Ian Reiter; Tommy Silva; John Fleischmann; Raymond Roper; Danyal Suchta; Joshua Canode; Jacob Flores
- Website: convictionsrock.com

Convictions is an American Christian metalcore band from Fremont, Ohio, formed in 2012. It consists of vocalist Michael Felker, drummer Zachary Schwochow, guitarist Patrick Shekut, and guitarist and clean vocalist Quinton Dreier. The band describes their genre as a style they created called "Aggressive Worship", which is an emotional mix of spirit filled hardcore and ambiance.

== Members ==
Current

- Zach Schwochow – drums (2012–present)
- Michael Felker – lead vocals (2013–present)
- Patrick Shekut – lead guitar (2022–present)
- Quinton Dreier – rhythm guitar, clean vocals (2022–present)

Former

- Dan Gardner – lead vocals (2012)
- Ian Reiter – bass (2012)
- Joshua Canode – rhythm guitar (2012–2022); clean vocals (2022)
- Justin Michael McGough – lead guitar (2012–2014)
- Thomas M. Silva – lead guitar (2014–2016)
- John Fleischmann – bass, clean vocals (2013–2018)
- Raymond Roper – bass, clean vocals (2018–2019)
- Danyal Suchta – bass, clean vocals (2019–2021)
- Jacob Flores – bass (2022–2025)

Timeline

== Discography ==
Studio albums

- I Am Nothing (2012)
- I Will Become (2016)
- Hope for the Broken (2018)
- I Won't Survive (2021)
- The Fear of God (2024)

EPs

- Unworthy (2013)
- Hallowed Spirit | Violent Divide (2015)

Other appearances

- "Memories in the Attic" appears on the compilation Happy Holidays, I Miss You
