= Shane Ochsner =

Everything in Slow Motion
- Also known as: Shane Ochsner
- Origin: Fargo, North Dakota, U.S.
- Genres: Post-rock, alternative rock, alternative metal, post-metal
- Instruments: Vocals, guitar, bass guitar, drums, etc.
- Years active: 2012–present
- Label: Facedown
- Website: everythinginslowmotion.com

Everything in Slow Motion (EISM) is an American music project by former Hands frontman Shane Ochsner from Fargo, North Dakota. The project began in February 2012, and he signed with Facedown Records soon thereafter. EISM first released a studio EP entitled Red in late 2012, and his first studio album entitled Phoenix that released in late 2013. The latter got the project commercial successes and critical acclaim.

== Background ==
After the hiatus of Hands, Shane Ochsner started the solo project on his own in February 2012. He signed with Facedown Records sometime in 2012 before he released his first studio EP.

== History ==
On October 2, 2012, EISM released his first studio EP entitled Red on Facedown Records, but did not see any critical or commercial viability from the work. After that, EISM went back into the studio to craft his first studio album called Phoenix that was met with commercial charting successes, and it got critical acclaim.

== Additional Musicians ==
Session

- Miles McPherson - Drums (2016) (ex-Paramore, ex-Maylene and the Sons of Disaster)

Live

- Aaron Bickel (2016–present)
- Mychael Scott Reed (2016–present)
- Aaron Crawford - Drums (2016–present) (NOW NOW Sleepyhead)

== Discography ==
Studio EPs

List of studio albums, with selected chart positions
Title	Album details	Peak chart positions	
Title	Album details	US CHR	US HEAT
Red	Released: October 2, 2012; Label: Facedown; LP, digital download	–	–
Laid Low	Released: April 22, 2016; Label: Facedown; LP, digital, Vinyl (limited)	40	23

Studio albums

List of studio albums, with selected chart positions
Title	Album details	Peak chart positions	
Title	Album details	US CHR	US HEAT
Phoenix	Released: December 10, 2013; Label: Facedown Records; vinyl CD, digital download	31	15
Influence	Released: October 16, 2020; Label: Facedown; LP, digital download	–	–

As guest artist

- In the Midst of Lions - "Reborn" (The Heart of Man, 2010)
- Your Memorial - "Endeavor for Purpose" and "Atonement" (Atonement, 2010)
- A Hope For Home - "Tides" (In Abstraction, 2011)
- Abandon Kansas - "Mirror" (Alligator, 2015)
- Hope for the Dying - "Wretched Curse" (Legacy, 2016)
- My Epic - "Ghost Story" (Viscera EP, 2016)
