= Mattie Montgomery =

American singer

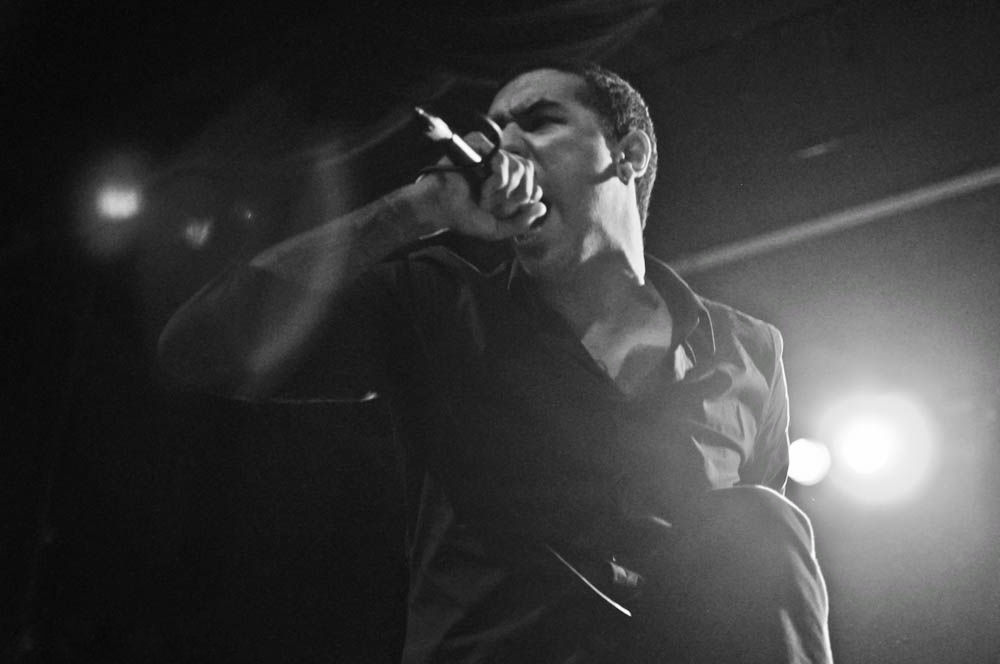
- Montgomery performing in 2011

Background information
- Born: July 24, 1987 (age 39)
- Origin: Michigan
- Genres: Christian metal, metalcore, gospel
- Occupations: Vocalist; songwriter; author; minister
- Years active: 2007–present
- Labels: Come And Live!, Catapult
- Formerly of: For Today, Besieged, Earth vs The Spider
- Website: mattiemontgomery.com

Matthew "Mattie" Montgomery (born July 24, 1987) is an American musician and the former lead vocalist and frontman of Christian metal band For Today. He released six albums and one EP with the band before they broke up in 2016. In addition to his work with For Today, Montgomery has his own solo gospel project named after himself in which he has released three albums and two books. He now pastors a church, The Altar Fellowship, in Johnson City, Tennessee.

== Music career ==
Montgomery began his involvement in music at the age of fifteen, where he has stated he listened to bands such as Senses Fail and A Static Lullaby. Groups such as these opened the door to heavier bands that would inspire Montgomery to try heavy vocals and screams in his singing. Before joining For Today, Montgomery was the lead vocalist for the melodic metal band Besieged.

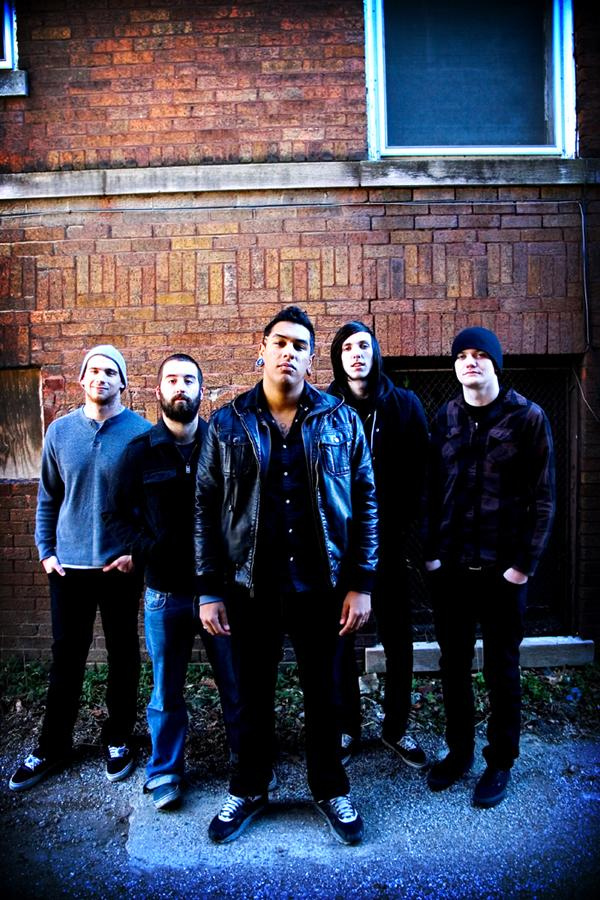
Montgomery (center) with For Today in 2009

Montgomery replaced For Today's original lead vocalist, Matt Tyler, in 2007. In an interview, Montgomery has said that he did not know a single member of the band before his joining. After only a few practices with the band, Montgomery began touring with them. He had given the members of For Today two conditions for his joining of the band: First, the band must have a Bible study together every day. Second, Montgomery wanted the band to use their time on stage performing to minister to the audience. Since he joined For Today, Montgomery has played well over 700 shows and toured extensively in six continents with the group. On July 5, 2016, the band announced that they would be disbanding after a farewell tour.

== Christianity ==
Montgomery is an outspoken Christian. He is passionate about Jesus and has made this evident with lyrics of For Today. Montgomery also works as an evangelist. He is currently the Pastor at The Altar Fellowship in Johnson City, TN

== Bands ==
- The Altar Music

Welcome Home (2022) - songwriter / spoken word

- For Today - vocals (2007–2016)
- Mattie Montgomery - spoken word (solo)
- Besieged - vocals (2007)
- Earth vs The Spider - vocals
- This My Soul - vocals
- Bedside Redemption - vocals

The Altar Music Welcome Home (2022) - songwriter / spoken word

== Discography ==
With Besieged

- Atlantis (Blood and Ink Records, 2007)

With For Today

- Ekklesia (Facedown Records, 2008)
- Portraits (Facedown Records, 2009)
- Breaker (Facedown Records, 2010) U.S. No. 54
- Immortal (Razor & Tie Records, 2012) U.S. No. 15
- Prevailer EP (Razor & Tie Records, 2013)
- Fight the Silence (Razor & Tie Records, 2014)
- Wake (Nuclear Blast Records, 2015)

Solo

- When the Sons Become Fathers (Come&Live!, 2010)
- The Keys to Open Ancient Gates (Catapult, 2011)
- See the Storm

=== Collaborations ===
Year	Song	Album	Artist
2010	"Oaxaca" (featuring Mattie Montgomery)	Unbreakable	Saving Grace
2013	"Can We Start Again?" (featuring Mattie Montgomery & Frankie Palmeri)	Renegades Forever	I See Stars
2013	"I W8 4 U" (featuring Mattie Montgomery)	Between Here and Lost	Love and Death
2014	"Onward to Freedom" (featuring Mattie Montgomery & Michael Sweet)	Onward to Freedom	Tourniquet
2014	"The Slave Ring" (featuring Mattie Montgomery, Nick Villars & Chris Poland)	Onward to Freedom	Tourniquet
2014	"Slave to Nothing" (featuring Mattie Montgomery)	Slave to Nothing	Fit for a King
2015	"Unharness" (featuring Mattie Montgomery)	Metanoia	For All Eternity
2015	"Misogyneric" (featuring Mattie Montgomery)	Beating a Dead Horse	Amidst the Grave's Demons
2015	"I Believe" (featuring Mattie Montgomery)	Tomorrow We Live	KB
2018	"Second Chance Kids" (featuring Mattie Montgomery)	I Am	Sleeping Giant

== Videography ==
- "Agape"
- "Saul of Tarsus (The Messenger)" (directed by Drew Russ)
- "Devastator" (Scott Hansen Productions)
- "Seraphim" (directed by Drew Russ)
- "Fearless"
- "Foundation"
- "Flesh and Blood" (directed by Ramon Boutviseth)
- "Fight the Silence"
- "Break the Cycle"
- "Molotov"
- "Broken Lens"
- "Bitter Roots"

== Solo work ==
Montgomery has released three spoken-word gospel albums under his own name. His First album, When the Sons Become Fathers, was released on March 1, 2010, under the Come And Live! record label. His second solo album, The Keys to Open Ancient Gates, was released on June 14, 2011, under Catapult records. On October 1, 2013, he released the third album, See the Storm.

Montgomery has also released two books: Lovely Things in Ugly Places (2015) and Scary God (2018).

== Personal life ==
Montgomery currently lives in Johnson City, Tennessee with his wife, and their three sons.
