= The Machine Stops =

1909 E.M. Forster science fiction short story

- Short story by E. M. Forster
- Country: England
- Language: English
- Genre: Science fiction short story

Publication
- Published in: The Oxford and Cambridge Review
- Publisher: Archibald Constable
- Media type: Print (Magazine, Hardback & Paperback)
- Publication date: November 1909

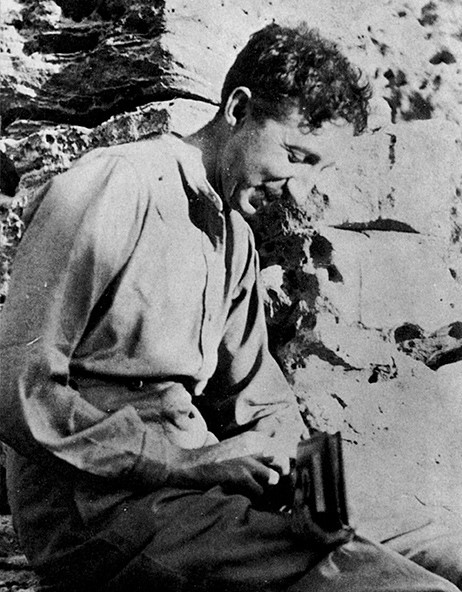
E.M. Forster, circa 1917

"The Machine Stops" is a science fiction short story by E. M. Forster. After initial publication in The Oxford and Cambridge Review (November 1909), the story was republished in Forster's The Eternal Moment and Other Stories in 1928. After being voted one of the best novellas up to 1965, it was included that same year in the popular anthology Modern Short Stories. In 1973 it was also included in The Science Fiction Hall of Fame, Volume Two.

The story, set in a world where humanity lives underground and relies on a giant machine to provide its needs, predicted technologies and cultural impacts similar to instant messaging, social media, the Internet, and artificial intelligence.

== Background ==
In the preface to his Collected Short Stories (1947), Forster wrote that "The Machine Stops" was intended as a rebuttal to one of the "earlier heavens" of H. G. Wells"; specifically his quasi-novel, A Modern Utopia, published in 1905. In contrast to Wells's political commentary, Forster points to the technology itself as the ultimate controlling force.

== Plot summary ==
The story describes a world in which most of the human population has lost the ability to live on the surface of the Earth due to extreme climate changes and toxic air. Each individual now lives in isolation below ground in a small standard room, with all survival, comfort and entertainment needs met by the omnipotent, global Machine. Travel to the surface is permitted but is unpopular and rarely necessary. Communication is made via a kind of instant messaging/video conferencing machine with which people conduct their only activity: the sharing of ideas and what passes for knowledge.

The two main characters, Vashti and her son Kuno, live on opposite sides of the world. Vashti is content with her life, which, like most inhabitants of the world, she spends producing and endlessly discussing second-hand 'ideas'. She enjoys talking to friends but uses her work to defend herself against their invitations to be more social, remaining in her ‘room’ where all her basic needs are met. Her son Kuno, however, is passionate, free-spirited and is considered a rebel in this world.

Kuno persuades a reluctant Vashti to endure the long, uncomfortable journey (and the resultant unwelcome personal interaction) to his room. He tells her of his disenchantment with the sanitised mechanical world and how this has led to his current troubles. He confides to her that he ordered a respirator and strengthened his body enough to explore and found a way to visit the surface of the Earth without permission. There, he saw other humans living outside the world of the Machine.

However mechanical agents of the Machine soon recaptured him and he is now threatened with 'Homelessness': expulsion from the underground environment and all supportive infrastructure, which is expected to result in death. Despite the toxicity of the surface air, Kuno longs to return and sees the controlling underground world as a kind of hell. Vashti listens to her son's story but considers the implications of his rebellion to be unthinkable, akin to dangerous madness. She dismisses his perspective and returns to her part of the world.

As time passes, and Vashti continues the routine of her daily life, there are two important developments. Following Kuno’s escape, individuals are no longer permitted use of the respirators which are needed to visit the Earth's surface. Most welcome this development, as they are sceptical and fearful of first-hand experience and of those who desire it. Secondly, "Mechanism", a kind of religion, is established in which the Machine is the object of worship. People forget that humans created the Machine and treat it as a mystical entity whose needs supersede their own.

Those who do not accept the deity of the Machine are viewed as 'unmechanical' and threatened with Homelessness. The Mending Apparatus—the system charged with repairing defects that appear in the Machine proper—has also failed by this time, but concerns about this are dismissed in the context of the supposed omnipotence of the Machine itself.

During this time, Kuno is transferred to a room near Vashti's. He comes to believe that the Machine is breaking down and tells her cryptically "The Machine stops." Vashti continues with her life, but defects begin to appear in the one-room world around her. At first, Vashti and all the people she knows accept the minor malfunctions in their environment as the whim of the Machine, to which they are now wholly subservient. Eventually the deterioration creates major problems but they are unfixable as the knowledge of how to repair the Machine has been lost.

Finally, the Machine collapses, bringing 'civilization' down with it. Kuno comes to Vashti's ruined room which has stopped supplying clean air, medicine, water and food and is in danger of collapse. They physically embrace one another for the first time since his childhood. Before they both perish, they acknowledge that humanity and its connection to the natural world are what truly matters, and that it will fall to the surface-dwellers who still exist to rebuild the human race and to prevent the mistake of the Machine from being repeated.

== Themes ==
The main theme of the story is the danger that humanity faces when it becomes overly reliant on technology for its survival; a less obvious, though equally important theme is what Forster refers to as "the sin against the body." This occurs when people's intellectual refinement and spirituality advance to such a point that they become disconnected from their physical bodies and are unable to adapt to changing environments.

== Critical reception ==
The Fantasy Book Review calls The Machine Stops "dystopic and quite brilliant," noting, "In such a short novel The Machine Stops holds more horror than any number of gothic ghost stories. Everybody should read it, and consider how far we may go ourselves down the road of technological 'advancement' and forget what it truly means to be alive;" rating the story as 10 out of 10.

As well as Forster predicting globalisation, the Internet, video conferencing and other aspects of 21st-century reality, Will Gompertz, writing on the BBC website on 30 May 2020, observed, "'The Machine Stops' is not simply prescient; it is a jaw-droppingly, gob-smackingly, breathtakingly accurate literary description of lockdown life in 2020."

In 2010, Wired magazine's Randy Alfred wrote, "1909: E.M. Forster publishes 'The Machine Stops,' a chilling tale of a futuristic information-oriented society that grinds to a bloody halt, literally. Some aspects of the story no longer seem so distant in the future."

The prescience of ‘The Machine Stops’ in depicting a future in which telecommunications, including global networks and videoconferencing, have upended human society and resulted in people becoming isolated and totally dependent on technology, was recognized as early as the 1970s. The first chapter of ‘The Machine Stops’ was included in Unit 16, ‘Telecommunications and Society’, of the Open university Course T321, ‘Telecommunication Systems’, first offered in 1976.

== Adaptations ==
- A television adaptation, directed by Philip Saville, was shown in the UK on 6 October 1966 as part of the second series of British science-fiction anthology TV series Out of the Unknown. It is one of only four episodes known to exist from the show's second series.
- In 2001, BBC Radio 4 aired Gregory Norminton's adaptation as a radio play. Another radio adaptation, by Philip Franks, aired on Radio 4 on 19 June 2022.
- Playwright Eric Coble's 2004 stage adaptation was broadcast on 16 November 2007 on WCPN 90.3 FM in Cleveland, Ohio.
- TMS: The Machine Stops is a graphic novel series adaptation written by Michael Lent with art by Marc Rene, published by Alterna Comics in February 2014.
- Playwright Neil Duffield's adaptation was staged at York Theatre Royal in May–June 2016.
- Writer-director Briony Dunn’s production was staged at Theatre Works in Melbourne in August 2025.

== Related works ==
- Mad #1 (Oct–Nov 1952) featured "Blobs", a seven-page story drawn by Wallace Wood where two inhabitants of 1,000,000 AD discuss the history of man and his evolution into "blobs" totally dependent on the Machine.
- Stephen Baxter's story "Glass Earth Inc.", which refers explicitly to "The Machine Stops", is included in the book Phase Space, published in 2003.
- Isaac Asimov's second novel in the Robot Series, The Naked Sun (1957), takes place on a planet similar to the Earth seen in this story. On the Planet Solaria, human colonists live isolated from one another, only viewing each other through holograms, and only have interactions with their robot retinues. After several centuries, the humans have become so dependent on this practice it has become taboo to even be in the presence of another human being.
- The song "The Machine Stops" by the band Level 42 not only shares the same title with the story but also has lyrics that echo Kuno's thoughts.
- The band A Hope for Home based their song "The Machine Stops" on their album Realis on this story by Forster.
- Both George Lucas's film THX 1138 (1971) and the original novel version of Logan's Run (1967) by William F. Nolan and George Clayton Johnson bear similarities to "The Machine Stops".
- The space rock band Hawkwind released a concept album titled The Machine Stops in 2016 based on the story by Forster.
- The book ''The machine stops and other stories'' appears in the video clip of ''Everydody laughs'', first song of the 2025 album ''Who is the sky ?'' from David Byrne.

== See also ==
- 1909 in science fiction
