= Lay Low =

Lay Low may refer to:

- Lay Low (musician), Icelandic musician and singer
- "Lay Low" (Snoop Dogg song), 2001
- "Lay Low", a song by Mark Morriss from Memory Muscle, 2008
- "Lay Low", a song by Blake Shelton from Based on a True Story..., 2013
- "Lay Low" (Josh Turner song), 2014
- "Lay Low", a song by DJ Tiësto, 2023

== See also ==
- Laylow (disambiguation)
- Laid Low, a 2016 EP by Everything in Slow Motion
- Laid Low, a song by The Naked and Famous from Simple Forms
