= Atonement (Your Memorial album) =

Studio album by Your Memorial
- Released: November 22, 2010
- Genre: Christian metal, metalcore, Christian hardcore
- Length: 34:12
- Label: Facedown
- Producer: Karl Schubach

Your Memorial chronology
| Seasons (2008) | Atonement (2010) | Redirect (2012) |

Atonement is the second studio album from Your Memorial. Facedown Records released the album on November 22, 2010. Your Memorial worked with Karl Schubach, in the production of this album.

== Critical reception ==
Professional ratings
Review scores
| Source | Rating |
|---|---|
| Christian Music Zine | B− |
| Cross Rhythms | 7/10 squares |
| HM Magazine | 3/5 stars |
| Indie Vision Music | 3/5 stars |
| Jesus Freak Hideout | 3.5/5 stars |
| The New Review | 4/5 stars |

Awarding the album three stars from HM Magazine, Nick Cotrufo states, "Atonement has a heavy sound, but it's a sound that has been heard throughout the scene." Ian Webber, rating the album a seven out of ten at Cross Rhythms, writes, "There are plenty of glimpses here that this band are willing to try to broaden their sound and appeal. If you like your metal full-on but with a few twists it may be worth seeking out 'Atonement'." Giving the album three and a half stars for Jesus Freak Hideout, Timothy Estabrooks describes, "If you don't demand that your metal be very creative or groundbreaking, Atonement is a pretty solid album."

Anthony Peronto, rating the album a B− for Christian Music Zine, writes, "in order to separate themselves from their ambient-labelmates Hands, they’ll have to continue to differentiate musically." Giving the album three stars from Indie Vision Music, BMer says, "Atonement is pretty good overall, attempting to forge into a new genre is always tough but Your Memorial have put together a good mix of serious, complex, heartfelt songs that should put them on the map." Josh Velliquette, awarding the album four stars by The New Review, states, "Dissecting song after song would not really do Atonement justice as the album yields added emotional and aural impact when experienced throughout a single listen."

== Track listing ==
All tracks are written by Your Memorial

| No. | Title | Length |
|---|---|---|
| 1. | "Endeavor for Purpose (feat. Shane Ochsner of Hands and Everything in Slow Motion)" | 3:52 |
| 2. | "Hope Era" | 3:26 |
| 3. | "Desolation" | 1:54 |
| 4. | "Atonement (feat. Shane Ochsner of Hands and Everything in Slow Motion)" | 4:01 |
| 5. | "Surface (feat. Karl Schubach of Misery Signals)" | 3:23 |
| 6. | "Not Fallen" | 5:18 |
| 7. | "My Path Is Set" | 1:06 |
| 8. | "Unseen" | 3:50 |
| 9. | "Surrender" | 2:34 |
| 10. | "Immaculate Design" | 4:48 |
| Total length: | | 34:12 |
