= Out of Darkness =

Out of Darkness may refer to:

- Out of Darkness (1994 film), an American television film
- Out of Darkness (2022 film), a British horror film
- "Out of Darkness" (Star Wars Rebels), a 2014 TV episode
- Out of Darkness (novel), a 2015 novel by Ashley Hope Pérez
- Out of Darkness (album), a 2009 album by In the Midst of Lions
- Out of Darkness, a 2011 album by Pharaoh Overlord
- Out of Darkness, a 2013 opera by Jake Heggie
