= The Heart of Man =

Studio album by In the Midst of Lions
- Released: August 3, 2010
- Genre: Christian metal, deathcore
- Length: 36:01
- Label: Facedown
- Producer: Jamie King

In the Midst of Lions chronology
Out of Darkness (2009)	The Heart of Man (2010)	Shadows (2011)

The Heart of Man is the second studio album from In the Midst of Lions. Facedown Records released the album on August 3, 2010. In the Midst of Lions worked with Jamie King, in the production of this album.

== Critical reception ==
Professional ratings
Review scores
Source	Rating
Blistering Magazine	6.5/10
Cross Rhythms	7/10 squares
HM Magazine	4/5 stars
Indie Vision Music	4/5 stars
Jesus Freak Hideout	3.5/5 stars
Mind Equals Blown	6.0/10
The New Review	4/5 stars

Awarding the album four stars from HM Magazine, Nathan Doyle states, "When The Heart of Man hits, there is a beautiful destruction left over, but the rain could have come a little sooner." Peter John Willoughby, rating the album a seven out of ten at Cross Rhythms, says, "ITMOL show a serious spiritual commitment." Giving the album three and a half stars for Jesus Freak Hideout, Michael Weaver writes, "Though there is nothing mind blowing or groundbreaking on this record, it's a fun listen and a solid outing for a band that still seems to be coming into their own." Ronak Ghorbani, writing for Exclaim!, describes, "In the Midst of Lions' newest release is packed with lusciously sludgy breakdowns."

Rating the album a 6.5 out of ten for Blistering Magazine, Justin Donnelly says, "The Heart of Man has it moments, but sadly, not enough of them to give the impression that In The Midst of Lions are the kind of band to stand out from the crowd." Joe Hughes, giving the album a six out of ten from Mind Equal Blown, writes, "They show through technical and well thought-out playing that they aren’t just a band trying to be heavy." Awarding the album four stars from The New Review, Luke Amos states, "The Heart of Man is nothing revolutionary or groundbreaking but it is a fun album to listen to." Steve, giving the album four stars at Indie Vision Music, describes, "The Heart of Man is a sonically crushing album that will make their current fans ecstatic and bring in a slew of new fans. ITMOL does a wonderful job of mixing slow grinding death metal with fast paced technical that will leave you wanting more."

== Track listing ==
No.	Title	Writer(s)	Length
1.	"The Heart of Man"	Matt Janssen, Alex Livingston, Ryan McAllister	3:27
2.	"The Pharisaic Heart"	M. Janssen, Livingston, McAllister	2:46
3.	"The Machine"	M. Janssen, Livingston, McAllister	3:09
4.	"Abandonment (feat. Levi The Poet)"	Livingston, McAllister, Levi the Poet	2:02
5.	"Opposition"	M. Janssen, Livingston, McAllister	3:43
6.	"At the Feet of Creation"	Colter Janssen, Janssen, Livingston, McAllister	2:00
7.	"Released (feat. Kramer Lowe of Forevermore and ex-Onward to Olympas, and Justin Gage)"	M. Janssen, Livingston, McAllister	3:45
8.	"Defiance (feat. Levi The Poet)"	Livingston, McAllister, Levi the Poet	4:03
9.	"Home (feat. Levi The Poet)"	Livingston, McAllister, Levi the Poet	1:12
10.	"Fearless (feat. Phil Porto)"	C. Janssen, M. Janssen, Livingston, McAllister	3:33
11.	"An Awakening"	M. Janssen, Livingston, McAllister	2:54
12.	"Reborn (feat. Shane Ochsner of Hands and Everything in Slow Motion)"	C. Janssen, M. Janssen, Livingston, McAllister	3:27
Total length:			36:01

== Chart performance ==
Chart (2010)	Peak position
US Heatseekers Albums (Billboard)	30
