= Metanoia (For All Eternity album) =

Studio album by For All Eternity
- Released: 10 July 2015
- Recorded: 2014
- Genre: Christian hardcore, melodic hardcore, melodic metalcore
- Length: 31:32
- Label: Facedown
- Producer: Brian Hood

For All Eternity chronology
Beyond the Gates (2012)	Metanoia (2015)	The Will to Rebuild (2017)

Metanoia is the second studio album by For All Eternity. Facedown Records released the album on 10 July 2015.

== Critical reception ==
Professional ratings
Review scores
Source	Rating
Jesus Freak Hideout	4/5 stars
Kill Your Stereo	80/100
The Music Australia	3/5 stars
Outburn	6/10

Signaling in a six out of ten review at Outburn, Greg Pratt says, "Metanoia is heavy...the clean vocals, of course, bring things down a little bit—the blueprint feels stagnant". Scott Fryberger, giving the album four stars for Jesus Freak Hideout, describes, he has "high hopes for For All Eternity...Metanoia is a solid debut and it has a lot of great points." Rating the album four stars from Jesus Freak Hideout, Mark Rice states, "It is an unashamedly appealing record, and its lyrical focus of struggling with inner turmoil, demons, and attempts to repent are both easy to resonate with...and worth digging into."

Awarding the album three out of five stars at The Music Australia, Maria Corio writes, "Scattered throughout this record, Michael Buckley’s quick and vigorous drumming is an aspect that stands out in contrast with his clean vocals, giving a strangely uplifting vibe." John G. rating the album an 80 out of 100 from Kill Your Stereo, states, "The album features dynamic, polished production and serves as an overall effective dose of local metalcore...'Metanoia', while admittedly nothing new, should catch wind within the Australian metal scene."

== Track listing ==
Track list
No.	Title	Length
1.	"Remove the Pulse"	1:22
2.	"Break of Dawn"	3:22
3.	"Further from Hate"	3:43
4.	"The Divide"	3:14
5.	"Mountainside"	1:03
6.	"Unharness" (featuring Mattie Montgomery of For Today)	4:03
7.	"Metanoia"	3:41
8.	"Stitched the Same" (featuring Kyle Tamosaitis of Burden of a Day)	3:01
9.	"White Flame"	4:03
10.	"Awaken the Heart"	4:00
Total length:		31:32

== Chart performance ==
Chart (2015)	Peak position
US Christian Albums (Billboard)	23
US Heatseekers Albums (Billboard)	21
