= Unbreakable (Saving Grace album) =

Studio album by Saving Grace
- Released: January 5, 2010
- Genre: Christian hardcore, metalcore, crossover thrash
- Length: 46:55
- Label: Strike First
- Producer: Zorran Mendonsa

Saving Grace chronology
Behind Enemy Lines (2008)	Unbreakable (2010)	The King Is Coming (2012)

Unbreakable is the second studio album from Saving Grace. Strike First Records released the album on January 5, 2010. Saving Grace worked with Zorran Mendonsa, in the production of this album.

== Critical reception ==
Professional ratings
Review scores
Source	Rating
Cross Rhythms	6/10 squares
Indie Vision Music	4/5 stars
Jesus Freak Hideout	4/5 stars 3/5 stars
The New Review	5/5 stars

Awarding the album four stars from Jesus Freak Hideout, Timothy Estabrooks states, "Unbreakable is an album that is exciting at times and at its worst is never less than a solid effort." Scott Fryberger, giving the album three stars for Jesus Freak Hideout, writes, "This isn't a fantastic album, by any means, but it's a good start for the band". Rating the album six out of ten at Cross Rhythms, Peter John Willoughby says, "these guys are relatively newcomers and comparisons to an established band like As I Lay Dying would be unfair". Steve, awarding the album four stars from Indie Vision Music, describes, "This brutal album is sure to please any metalcore fan out there." Giving the album five stars by The New Review, Ben Westerman writes, "It's heavy, brutal, aggressive, and will leave your eardrums broken and beaten; but it's an experience that any fan of metal should be able to appreciate and will likely enjoy!"

== Track listing ==
No.	Title	Length
1.	"End of Day (Intro)"	1:33
2.	"Unbreakable"	4:33
3.	"Bury Me in Jiménez"	2:42
4.	"The Disgusting Maw"	4:04
5.	"Pukelips"	3:35
6.	"Where It Rains"	4:21
7.	"The Eye of the Storm Part II (Interlude)"	2:06
8.	"Oaxaca" (featuring Mattie Montgomery of For Today)	5:03
9.	"All, But the Archer"	5:26
10.	"The Listener"	4:45
11.	"Bound by Blood"	2:53
12.	"The Determined Drunk"	5:54
Total length:		46:55

== Credits ==
Saving Grace

- Nicholas Tautuhi - Vocals
- Vasely Sapunov - Guitars
- George White - Bass
- Ben Davidson - Drums

Production

- Zorran Mendonsa - producer, engineering, mixing, additional guitars
- Logan Mader - mastering
- Dave Quiggle - Artwork
