= Breaker (For Today album) =

Studio album by For Today
- Released: August 31, 2010
- Recorded: 2010
- Studio: The Machine Shop, Hoboken, New Jersey
- Genre: Metalcore
- Length: 35:15
- Label: Facedown
- Producer: Will Putney

For Today chronology
Portraits (2009)	Breaker (2010)	Immortal (2012)

Professional ratings
Review scores
Source	Rating
AllMusic	3.5 /5 stars
Jesus Freak Hideout	3.5/5 stars
Indie Vision Music	Mixed

Breaker is the third studio album by American Christian metalcore band For Today, released on August 31, 2010.

== Track listing ==
No.	Title	Length
1.	"The Breaker's Origin"	0:43
2.	"Devastator"	3:38
3.	"The Advocate"	3:47
4.	"The Breaker's Valley"	1:30
5.	"Seraphim"	3:59
6.	"Arm the Masses" (featuring Drew Dijorio of Stray from the Path)	3:03
7.	"White Flag"	3:32
8.	"The Breaker's Encounter"	1:36
9.	"Phoenix" (featuring Shane Raymond of Close Your Eyes)	3:05
10.	"Psalm of the Son"	2:53
11.	"King" (featuring Jay Pepito of Reign Supreme)	4:03
12.	"The Breaker's Commission"	3:26
Total length:		35:15

== Personnel ==
For Today

- Mattie Montgomery - lead vocals
- Ryan Leitru - lead guitar
- Mike Reynolds - rhythm guitar
- Brandon Leitru - bass guitar
- David Morrison - drums, percussion

Production

- Produced, Engineered, Mixed, and mastered by Will Putney
- Artwork by Sol Amstutz and layout by Sons of Nero
