= Wake (For Today album) =

Studio album by For Today
- Released: October 2, 2015
- Studio: Graphic Nature Audio, Belleville, NJ
- Genre: Christian metal, metalcore
- Length: 36:55; 44:35 (bonus tracks)
- Label: Nuclear Blast
- Producer: Will Putney

For Today chronology
Fight the Silence (2014)	Wake (2015)

Wake is the sixth and final studio album from American Christian metalcore band For Today. Nuclear Blast released the album on October 2, 2015.

The album debuted at No. 67 on the Billboard 200, with around 7,000 copies sold the United States in its first week of release.

== Critical reception ==
Professional ratings
Review scores
Source	Rating
About.com	4/5 stars
Already Heard	3/5 stars
Christ Core	9.3/10
Cross Rhythms	9/10 squares
HM Magazine	3.5/5 stars
New Noise Magazine	4/5 stars
Metal.de	7/10
Metal Hammer	6/10
Outburn	6/10
Revival Media	9/10

Awarding the album four stars for About.com, Chad Bowar describes, "The album blends ferocious yells and dense riffs with melodic vocals and memorable choruses. They are tailor made for live shows, with both pit-inducing breakdowns and singalong parts. The songwriting is excellent, shifting tempos and intensities enough to avoid monotony, and even though they aren't reinventing the wheel, the execution is flawless." Natasha Van Duser, giving the album four stars from New Noise Magazine, states, "New sonic directions are typically hard to uphold, but For Today transitions flawlessly with Wake creating one of the most brutal records they’ve released to date."

Signaling in a nine out of ten review at Revival Media, Joshua Palmer responds, "Its ability to have the same gritty sound through its softer and harder sections gives it that edge over today's metalcore and shows they are not going anywhere anytime soon." Phillip Noell, rating the album a 9.3 out of ten for Christ Core, says, "They deliver every time." Ben Rickaby, awarding the album three and a half stars from HM Magazine, says, "Wake hits close to home, and, throughout the album, there’s a prevailing message of hope through looking to the cross." Assigning the album a nine out of ten by Cross Rhythms, Rob Birtley recognizes, "It would be easy for the band to hide in a repetition of Christian platitudes, but Montgomery's skillful writing ably bridges the gap that both Christians and non-Christians can relate to to produce songs that are truly memorable."

Rating the album a six out of ten at Outburn, Nathaniel Lay writes, "Wake falls short too often to leave a lasting impression. It's the weakest release the band has had in recent memory as a result. I'm only a fan of Immortal and Fight The Silence, and quite honestly my favorite band is Design The Skyline." Luke Morton, indicating in a six out of ten review by Metal Hammer, says, "Despite the initial refreshing blasts, there are no obvious risks being taken. Yes, the music is high quality but it's all a bit too safe and wipe-clean. Clean vocals and crushing vocals break the monotony, but For Today are still searching for that diamond they're so close to." Specifying in a three star review from Already Heard, Rob Fearnley replies, "Is ‘Wake’ a strong album? Absolutely, yes. Is it going to open them up to a wider audience? Probably not, but for die-hards of the genre there's certainly enough to be content with if not overly excited."

== Track listing ==
No.	Title	Length
1.	"No Truth, No Sacrifice"	4:07
2.	"Broken Lens"	3:25
3.	"Forced into Fire"	3:12
4.	"Deserter"	4:16
5.	"Bitter Roots"	3:27
6.	"Wasteland"	2:49
7.	"Hopeless Ambition"	3:13
8.	"Determination"	4:10
9.	"Flooded Earth"	4:54
10.	"Time and Tide"	3:21
11.	"Two Brothers" (bonus track)	4:12
12.	"Without You" (bonus track)	3:29
Total length:		44:35

== Personnel ==
For Today

- Mattie Montgomery - lead vocals
- Ryan Leitru - lead guitar, clean vocals, piano (tracks 5, 9).
- Brandon Leitru - bass
- David Puckett - drums, percussion

Production

- Will Putney – producer, audio engineer, mixing, mastering
- Randy LeBoeuf – audio engineer, additional engineering
- Tom Smith Jr. – audio editing
- Steve Seid – audio editing
- Manny Muniz – audio editing
- Jim Hughes (Northary) – layout
- Jordan Butcher – additional artwork
- Dave Quiggle – additional artwork

== Chart performance ==
Chart (2015)	Peak position
US Billboard 200	67
US Christian Albums (Billboard)	3
US Top Hard Rock Albums (Billboard)	10
US Independent Albums (Billboard)	9
US Top Rock Albums (Billboard)	17
