= Shadows (In the Midst of Lions album) =

Studio album by In the Midst of Lions
- Released: November 22, 2011
- Genre: Christian metal, deathcore
- Length: 30:46
- Label: Facedown

In the Midst of Lions chronology
The Heart of Man (2010)	Shadows (2011)

Shadows is the third and final studio album from In the Midst of Lions. Facedown Records released the album on November 22, 2011.

== Critical reception ==
Professional ratings
Review scores
Source	Rating
The Christian Music Review Blog	4.5/5 stars
Cross Rhythms	7/10 squares
HM Magazine	3/5 stars
Indie Vision Music	4/5 stars
Jesus Freak Hideout	3/5 stars 3.5/5 stars
Mind Equals Blown	5.5/10
The New Review	4/5 stars

Awarding the album three stars for HM Magazine, David Stagg states, "So, while the production value of the quintet's Shadows is great, there isn't enough consistency in this piece to make heads turn." Andy Shaw, rating the album a seven out of ten at Cross Rhythms, says, he "enjoyed the (just over) half hour of power provided on this album." Giving the album three stars from Jesus Freak Hideout, Michael Weaver writes, "it comes at the price of redundancy in sound." Steven Powless, awarding the album three and a half stars by Jesus Freak Hideout, describes, "In The Midst Of Lions could take a few more steps out of their comfort zone and incorporate some more innovation into their signature sound, they'd have a incredibly promising future and a much longer shelf life."

Brody Barbour, giving the album four stars from Indie Vision Music, writes, "'Shadows' is leaps and bounds ahead of 'The Heart of Man'". Rating the album a 5.5 out of ten for Mind Equal Blown, Austin Gordon describes, "this is your run-of-the-mill generic deathcore album; full of guttural vocals, breakdowns to the brink and chugs. So many chugs." Luke Amos, awarding the album four stars by The New Review, states, "The music is, unsurprisingly, heavy. The drums sadly do little to distinguish themselves but perform adequately." Giving the album four and a half stars at The Christian Music Review Blog, Jonathan Kemp says, "ITMOL created a masterpiece with Shadows".

== Track listing ==
All tracks are written by Colter Janssen, Matt Janssen, In the Midst of Lions

No.	Title	Length
1.	"False Idols"	3:09
2.	"The Call"	3:05
3.	"Take Your Place"	2:42
4.	"Overcome"	3:06
5.	"Call of the Oppressed"	3:15
6.	"New Beginnings"	3:15
7.	"An Offering"	2:40
8.	"Hardened Hearts"	3:11
9.	"Prepare the Way"	2:27
10.	"One for All"	3:56
Total length:		30:46

== Chart performance ==
Chart (2011)	Peak position
US Heatseekers Albums (Billboard)	12
