= The King Is Coming =

Studio album by Saving Grace
- Released: November 22, 2011
- Genre: Christian hardcore, metalcore, crossover thrash
- Length: 36:23
- Label: Facedown
- Producer: Zorran Mendonsa

Saving Grace chronology
Unbreakable (2010)	The King Is Coming (2011)	The Urgency (2014)

The King Is Coming is the third studio album from Saving Grace. Facedown Records released the album on November 22, 2011. Saving Grace worked with Zorran Mendonsa, in the production of this album.

== Critical reception ==
Professional ratings
Review scores
Source	Rating
The Christian Music Review Blog	8/10
Cross Rhythms	8/10 squares
HM Magazine	4.5/5 stars
Indie Vision Music	4/5 stars
Jesus Freak Hideout	4/5 stars

Awarding the album four and a half stars from HM Magazine, Rob Shameless states, "The Kings Is Coming is their septor(sic)." Rating the album an eight out of ten at Cross Rhythms, Graeme Crawford writes, "There are only a few downsides here." Giving the album four stars for Jesus Freak Hideout, Steven Powless describes, "with The King Is Coming, they have firmly established themselves among Facedown's best and show nothing but promise; forgive the wordplay, but this blistering, Spirit-filled band may just be their label's Saving Grace." Jeremiah Holdworth, awarding the album four stars from Indie Vision Music, states, "Songs range from amazing, to great, with a couple that fall short, including a boring instrumental ... Great music and messages equals a great album!" Rating the album an eight out of ten by The Christian Music Review Blog, Grant White writes, "They need the extra wow factor to make themselves become more known."

== Track listing ==
All lyrics are written by Saving Grace

No.	Title	Length
1.	"The King Is Coming"	2:26
2.	"Shekinah"	3:49
3.	"The First Woe"	2:05
4.	"Cross Contamination"	2:21
5.	"Deathless"	3:10
6.	"Man of Sorrows (The Funeral Dirge)"	2:18
7.	"The Eye of the Storm Part III"	2:00
8.	"Habakkuk" (Feat. Carl Schwartz of First Blood)	3:04
9.	"Kefirah"	4:26
10.	"Beware the Apostates"	2:47
11.	"Revelation"	3:39
12.	"With Lifted Eyes"	4:18
Total length:		36:23

== Credits ==
Saving Grace

- Vasely Sapunov - Guitar, Vocals
- Nicholas Tautuhi - Vocals
- Shaun Anderson - Drums
- Mike Benson - Bass
- George White - Guitar

Additional Musicians

- Carl Schwartz (First Blood) - Guest Vocals on track 8

Production

- Logan Mader - Mastering
- Zorran Mendonsa - Engineer, Guitar, Producer, Programming
- Dave Quiggle - Artwork, Layout
- Carl Schwartz - Additional Personnel
