= In the Midst of Lions =

American deathcore band

- Also known as: ITMOL
- Origin: St. Louis, Missouri, United States
- Genres: Deathcore, Christian metal
- Years active: 2009–2012, 2017
- Labels: Facedown
- Past members: Ryan McAllister; Alex Livingston; Matt Janssen; Sam Penner; Lance Bettis; Louis Probst; Jake Mitchell

In the Midst of Lions was an American deathcore band from St. Louis, Missouri. They have three full-length album releases: Out Of Darkness, The Heart of Man and Shadows. The name of the band pertains to a biblical scripture in Psalms 57:4.

== Biography ==
In the Midst of Lions originated from the St. Louis music scene. After the success of their debut album, Out Of Darkness on Strike First Records, the band signed to Facedown Records where they released The Heart of Man. This album reached No. 30 on the Billboard Heatseekers chart.

They headlined a tour with bands such as This or the Apocalypse, Your Memorial, and No Bragging Rights. They also appeared on the Over the Limit Tour with Bury Your Dead, Evergreen Terrace, Thick as Blood, along with other acts. The band released its third studio album on Facedown Records, entitled Shadows, on November 22, 2011. This album peaked at No. 12 on the Billboard Heatseekers chart.

In 2011, the band broke up. The band issued a statement regarding the breakup:

Hello, everyone!

We are so so sorry for how long it has taken us to update you all on the situation with the band.

After our last tour in November of 2011 ended we came home with intentions of resting up and heading back out on the road on the "Kingdom Days" tour in April of 2012. Unfortunately, the long break from tour along with some other opportunities for a couple of the band members meant that 2 of our members were leaving the band. This caused us to cancel our April tour for the remaining members to decide what our next step was. After a few months of no decisions and lack of motivation to catch 2 new members up to speed we decided to call it quits and see where the Lord would take us in our own lives individually.

We are truly sorry that we took so long [to] I update you. If we have any farewell tour shows or even a tour in the future we will update you immediately.

God bless you all and thank you for the support though the years! We truly appreciate all your support!!

– ITMOL

== Members ==
Last Known Lineup

- Ryan McAllister – lead guitar (2009–2012, 2017) (currently in GOGA)
- Alex Livingston – drums (2009–2012, 2017)
- Matt Janssen – vocals (2009-2012, 2017)
- Sam Penner – rhythm guitar (2009-2012, 2017) (formerly of For Today, formerly of The Devil Wears Prada live, Memphis May Fire)
- Jake Mitchell – bass (2009-2012, 2017)

Former

- Lance Bettis - rhythm guitar (2009)
- Louis Probst - bass (2009)

== Studio albums ==
Year	Title
2009	Out of Darkness: Released: May 26, 2009; Label: Strike First Records
2010	The Heart of Man: Released: August 3, 2010; Label: Facedown Records
2011	Shadows: Released: November 22, 2011; Label: Facedown Records
