= Redirect (album) =

Studio album by Your Memorial
- Released: July 17, 2012
- Genre: Christian hardcore, metalcore, Christian metal
- Length: 42:40
- Label: Facedown
- Producer: Josh Barber, Your Memorial

Your Memorial chronology
Atonement (2010)	Redirect (2012)

Redirect is the third and final studio album from Your Memorial. Facedown Records released the album on July 17, 2012. Your Memorial worked with Josh Barber, in the production of this album.

== Critical reception ==
Professional ratings
Review scores
Source	Rating
The Christian Music Review Blog	8/10
Christian Music Zine	4.5/5 stars
Cross Rhythms	8/10 squares
HM Magazine	2.5/5 stars
Indie Vision Music	4/5 stars
Jesus Freak Hideout	3.5/5 stars
Mind Equals Blown	7.5/10

Awarding the album two and a half stars from HM Magazine, Tim Hallila states, "Redirect represents a step up across the board." Ian Webber, rating the album an eight out of ten at Cross Rhythms, says, "Your Memorial are certainly a band who continue to grow and develop without leaving behind fans of crunching, ear splitting metal." Giving the album three and a half stars for Jesus Freak Hideout, Michael Weaver writes, "While a lot of the riffing and chugging is fairly standard and generic throughout Redirect, Your Memorial is able to throw enough extra in to keep it interesting." Tim Dodderidge, rating the album a 7.5 out of ten by Mind Equal Blown, describes, "Though it takes some time to fully grow to like Redirect, the passion it possesses holds a lasting impact on those willing to delve into it." Awarding the album four stars for Indie Vision Music, Brody Barbour writes, "While still not perfect, Redirect finds the band branching out and taking their place as of the heavyweights on the Facedown roster." Anthony Peronto, giving the album four and a half stars from Christian Music Zine, states, "Your Memorial has made a very good sophomore album that not only improves on their debut but also continues a spiritual theme that any Christian can relate to." Rating the album an eight out of ten at The Christian Music Review Blog, Jonathan Kemp says, "Redirect is an album you do not want to miss."

== Track listing ==
All tracks are written by Your Memorial

No.	Title	Length
1.	"Transfiguration"	1:52
2.	"Redirect"	3:48
3.	"Shipwreck"	3:55
4.	"Eternity"	4:24
5.	"Substance of Things Hoped For..."	1:05
6.	"Change the World"	3:13
7.	"Transform"	3:21
8.	"Anthem"	4:28
9.	"...Evidence of Things Unseen"	3:34
10.	"Trial and Triumph"	3:39
11.	"Cadence For a King"	5:26
12.	"Legacy"	3:55
Total length:		42:40

== Chart performance ==
Chart (2012)	Peak position
US Christian Albums (Billboard)	25
US Heatseekers Albums (Billboard)	17
