= Besieged (band) =

American Christian metal band

- Origin: Bay City, Michigan, U.S.
- Genres: Metalcore
- Years active: 2004–2010 (On Hiatus)
- Label: Blood & Ink
- Members: Josh Schroeder; Tyler Germain; John Pichla; Chris Greene; Scooch
- Past members: Paul Stotts; Andrew Rick; Josh Keef; Freddie Willbanks; Nick Fonzi; Mattie Montgomery
- Website: Besieged on Facebook

Besieged is a Christian metal band from Saginaw and Bay City, Michigan. The band was formed by drummer Josh Schroeder, the only member in every line-up, who later became a producer and has recorded albums for Those Who Fear, A Plea for Purging, and The Burial. Former vocalist Mattie Montgomery left to join the band For Today in 2007. The band was supposed to do a Super Mario Bros. 3 cover for the game, but it is uncertain if that happened or not. The band played on the Blood and Ink Fest, along with, xLooking Forwardx, Burden of a Day, and Saints Never Surrender.

== History ==
Besieged was formed by drummer Josh Schroeder, guitarists, Josh Keef and Andrew Rick, bassist Paul Stotts, and vocalist Freddie Willbanks in 2004.

The band recorded their debut EP, The First War with this line-up until, Stotts and Keef had quit the band. They were replaced by bassist Tyler Germain and rhythm guitarist John Pichla.

This line-up recorded their second EP, titled: The Curse of Two Dragons in 2005. Willbanks quit in 2007 and was replaced by, future For Today Vocalist Mattie Montgomery. Rick quit around the same time and was replaced by Chris Greene.

The band recorded Atlantis in 2007. Montgomery quit after the release, and Germain took over vocals and passed Bass duties to Nick Fonzi. In 2009, Vocalist "Scooch" took over vocals while Germain took over bass again due to Fonzi quitting the band. The band has been on hiatus since 2010.

In 2017, the band remastered and released "INRI", the single off Atlantis due to the album's 10 year anniversary.

== Members ==
Last Known Line-up

- Josh Schroeder - drums (2004-2010)
- Tyler Germain - bass (2005-2007, 2009-2010), vocals (2007-2009)
- John Pichla - rhythm guitar (2005-2010)
- Chris Greene - lead guitar (2007-2010)
- Scooch - vocals (2009-2010)

Former Members

- Paul Stotts - bass (2004-2005)
- Andrew Rick - lead guitar (2004-2007)
- Josh Keef - rhythm guitar (2004-2005)
- Freddie Willbanks - vocals (2004-2007)
- Nick Fonzi - bass (2007-2009)
- Mattie Montgomery - vocals (2007)

== Discography ==
EPs

- The First War (2004)
- The Curse of Two Dragons (2005)

Studio Albums

- Atlantis (2007)

Singles

- "The Sentinal" (2009)
- "INRI" (2017)
