= Atlantis (Besieged album) =

Studio album by Besieged
- Released: June 26, 2007
- Recorded: January – March 2007
- Genres: Christian metal, metalcore
- Length: 59:55
- Label: Blood & Ink
- Producer: Josh Schroeder

Besieged chronology
The Curse of Two Dragons (2005)	Atlantis (2007)

Professional ratings
Review scores
Source	Rating
Encyclopedia Metallum	75%
Indie Vision Music	3/5 stars
Sputnik Music	3.4 stars on a 5 point scale

Atlantis is the first album of Christian metal band, Besieged. It is the band's only full-length release before the band went on hiatus.

== Critical reception ==
Josh Murphy (a.k.a. JoshIVM) of Indie Vision Music writes: "The band has potential to put out better records and they got a lower score because of some of the vocal issues. It felt perfect at times and sometimes I couldn’t stand it. A better suited vocalist would have gained them a higher score. The other issue was the recording could have sounded better. I look forward to what this band can do down the road. Hopefully the acquire a new vocalist soon so we can find out." The writer of Encyclopedia Metallum stated: "Besieged debute [sic] Atlantis is overall an average album that unfortunately could have been much better. Best songs Balkanization, A Cold Winter Kiss, Moustache Pete, They Shake The Earth, and the first five minutes of Atlantis. I recommend this debut album only to die-hard fans of metalcore and As I Lay Dying everyone else stay away." E. Thomas of Teeth of the Divine reports: "Despite mixing the now Victory perfected mix of stern breakdowns, dual galloping European guitars, screams, impressive deep bellows, acoustic breaks and gang chants, Besieged manage to generally avoid the poppy, emo vocals (with the exception of “Moustache Pete”) or musical breaks that plague many of their peers. The song writing is what makes Atlantis standout from the similar looking pack, with some solid breakdowns (“Carved in the Walls”, “INRI”, “The Fall of Man: the Rise of Self”) very nice melodies and licks in tracks like “Balkanization”, “The Author”, “Guttersnipe”, “The Years Between”, “They Shake the Earth” and “Atlantis”, all kept a little more brutal by way of the impressive roars of vocalist Mattie, who could growl for the most brutal Death metal bands, and a stout production."

== Track listing ==
No.	Title	Length
1.	"Balkanization"	5:02
2.	"The Author"	2:47
3.	"Guttersnipe"	4:04
4.	"Written Promises"	3:03
5.	"A Cold Winters Kiss"	3:16
6.	"INRI"	3:43
7.	"The Years Between"	4:43
8.	"Moustache Pete"	4:14
9.	"The Fall of Man: The Rise of Self"	3:22
10.	"They Shake The Earth"	3:38
11.	"Carved in the Walls"	3:37
12.	"Atlantis"	18:26
Total length:		59:55

== Personnel ==
Besieged

- Mattie Montgomery - Vocals
- John Pichla - Lead Guitar
- Tyler Germain - Bass
- Chris Greene - Rhythm Guitar
- Josh Schroeder - Drums, All production
