= For All Eternity (band) =

Australian metalcore band

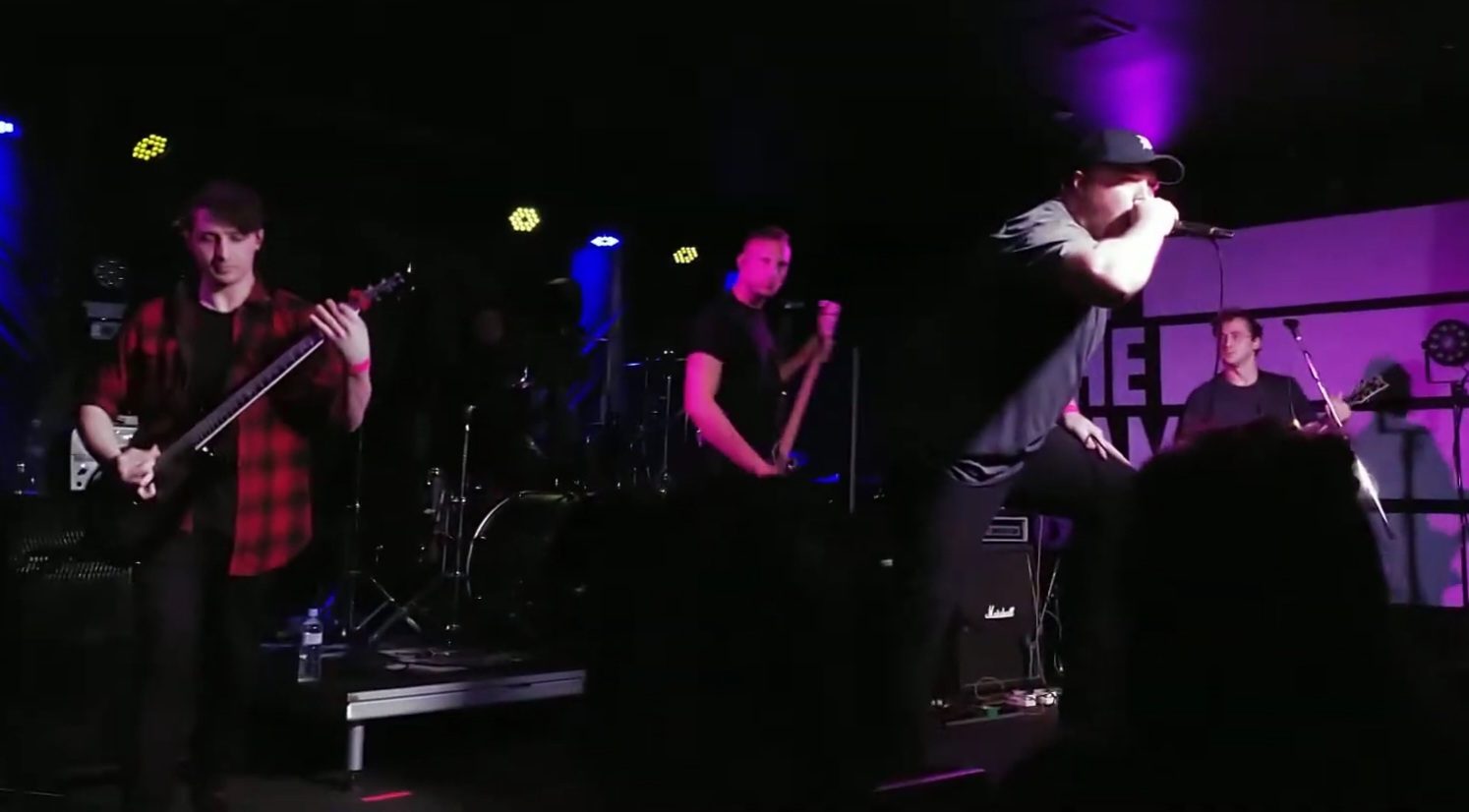
- For All Eternity performing in 2018

Background information
- Origin: Sydney, Australia
- Genres: Metalcore; Christian hardcore; post-hardcore
- Years active: 2008–present
- Labels: Facedown, Shock, Taperjean
- Members: Shane Carroll; Michael Buckley; Jeremy Mosiejczuk; Nicholas Page; Scott Dibley
- Past members: Gavin Bain; Andrew Cornale; Nathanael Edwards
- Website: facebook.com/foralleternitymusic

For All Eternity, formed in 2008, is an Australian Christian metalcore band from Sydney. The band independently released an extended play, For All Eternity, in 2009. Their first studio album, Beyond the Gates, was released in 2012 with Taperjean Records and Shock Records. Their second studio album, Metanoia, was released with Facedown Records in 2015. This album would be their Billboard magazine breakthrough release on the Christian Albums and Heatseekers Albums charts.

== Background ==
For All Eternity is a hardcore and metal band from Sydney, New South Wales. Their members are vocalist Shane Carroll, drummer and vocalist Michael Buckley, guitarists Jeremy Mosiejczuk and Nicholas Page, and bassist Scott Dibley. Former members include guitarist Andrew Comale and bassists Nathanael Edwards and Gavin Bain.

== Music history ==
The band commenced as a musical entity in August 2008, with their first release, an extended play, For All Eternity, which they released independently in 2009. Their first studio album, Beyond the Gates, was released in tandem with Shock Records alongside Taperjean Records on 24 August 2012. Their subsequent studio album, Metanoia, was released on 10 July 2015 by Facedown Records, and this just happened to be the first ever worldwide release date for albums. This album was their breakthrough release upon the Billboard magazine charts, where it peaked on the Christian Albums chart at No. 23, while it peaked at No. 21 on the Heatseekers Albums chart. Vocalist Shane Carroll stated that Vasely Sapunov of Saving Grace is who got the band placed on the label roster.

== Members ==
Current members

- Shane Carroll – unclean vocals (2008–present), clean vocals (2017–present)
- Michael Buckley – drums, clean vocals (2008–present)
- Jeremy Mosiejczuk – guitar (2008–present)
- Nicholas Page – guitar (2011–present)
- Scott Dibley – bass guitar (2011–present)

Former members

- Andrew Comale – guitar (2010–2011)
- Gavin Bain – bass guitar (2010–2011)
- Nathanael Edwards – bass guitar (2008–2010)

Timeline

== Discography ==
Studio albums

List of studio albums, with selected chart positions
Title	Album details	Peak chart positions	
Title	Album details	US Christ	US Heat
Beyond the Gates	Released: 24 August 2012; Label: Shock/Taperjean; Format: CD, digital download	—	—
Metanoia	Released: 10 July 2015; Label: Facedown; Format: CD, digital download	23	21
The Will to Rebuild	Released: 15 December 2017; Label: Facedown; Format: CD, digital download	—	—

EPs

- For All Eternity (2009, Independent)
