= Give Me Rest =

Studio album by Hands
- Released: July 5, 2011
- Genres: Christian metal, metalcore, progressive metal
- Length: 53:47
- Label: Facedown
- Producers: Joshua Barber, Shane Ochsner

Hands chronology
Creator (2009)	Give Me Rest (2011)

Give Me Rest is the third studio album by Hands. Facedown Records released the album on July 5, 2011. Hands worked with Joshua Barber and Shane Ochsner, in the production of this album.

== Critical reception ==
Professional ratings
Review scores
Source	Rating
HM Magazine	4/5 stars
Indie Vision Music	5/5 stars
Jesus Freak Hideout	4.5/5 stars
Mind Equals Blown	8.0/10
Sputnikmusic	3.5/5

Awarding the album four stars from HM Magazine, Rob Shameless states, "The is one of the most dynamic records Hands has ever put out." Aziz, rating the album 3.5 out of five for Sputnikmusic, writes, "A wholly lustrous album, rife with moving and expressive vocal performances at every turn and relaxing yet inexorable [guitar work] across the board, Hands’ latest offering has few faults." Giving the album four and a half stars at Jesus Freak Hideout, Wayne Reimer says, "It's thick with relatable emotion, carried on the back of extremely robust musicianship." Rating the album an 8.0 out of ten by Mind Equals Blown, Sebastian Fonseca states, "Give Me Rest is really a gem of an album, it’s original while still being accessible, and it’s pummeling while still being soothing." Jeremiah Holdsworth, awarding the album five stars from Indie Vision Music, writes, "This album is captivating, musically and lyrically, from beginning to end."

== Track listing ==
No.	Title	Writer(s)	Length
1.	"I Will"	Shane Ochsner	4:06
2.	"Water"	Ochsner, Josh Silbernagel, Nathan Winchell	5:21
3.	"Cube"	Ochsner	4:21
4.	"The Helix"	Ochsner	6:35
5.	"Here I Am"	Ian Johnson, Oschner	4:11
6.	"Jovian"	Ochsner, Silbernagel	6:07
7.	"Northern Lights"	Johnson, Ochsner, Silbernagel	5:17
8.	"2005"	Oschner	5:21
9.	"Restart"	Johnson, Ochsner, Silbernagel	5:21
10.	"Give Me Rest"	Ochsner	7:07
Total length:			53:47
