= Viscera (EP) =

EP by My Epic
- Released: May 6, 2016
- Genre: Christian rock; post-rock; alternative rock; indie rock; experimental rock; progressive rock
- Length: 26:18
- Label: Facedown

My Epic chronology
Behold (2013)	Viscera (2016)	Ultraviolet (2018)

Viscera is the third extended play from My Epic. Facedown Records released the EP on May 6, 2016.

== Critical reception ==
Professional ratings
Review scores
Source	Rating
Jesus Freak Hideout	4/5 stars
New Noise Magazine	4.5/5 stars
New Release Today	4/5 stars

Christopher Smith writes, "Viscera doesn't have quite the same lyrical mastery as Broken Voice, nor the musical epicness of Behold, but it is nonetheless a captivating and thought-provoking mini-album." Dylan O'Connor says, "if you have the patience to sit through longer songs with a slow burn, Viscera is a rewarding listen." David Craft states, "don't let this gem pass you by." Fryberger opines, "Viscera is an EP that feels like a full-length record, as its five songs are full of not only minutes and seconds, but more depth than a lot of full-length records these days."

Mary Nikkel describes, "Full of hard-edged guitar tones, otherworldly vocals and lyrics that are both vividly poetic and intensely human, Viscera is the best yet from My Epic." Nicholas Senior believes, "Viscera is a great example of a good band evolving into a great one...Viscera sees the band merging their pasts quite well, with Yet's post-Thrice-style grunge building upon the graceful beauty of Behold." Chad Brown suggests, "those who remain, sink in, so-to-speak, and allow themselves to be swept up by the tangible emotions, sweeping melodies, and poetic lyricism will be rewarded by one of 2016’s most satisfying and frankly beautiful releases."

== Track listing ==
No.	Title	Length
1.	"Ghost Story" (featuring Shane Ochsner)	6:08
2.	"Memoir"	6:37
3.	"Cesura"	1:37
4.	"Wive's Tale"	4:00
5.	"Open Letter"	7:56
Total length:		26:18

== Chart performance ==
Chart (2016)	Peak position
US Christian Albums (Billboard)	21
US Top Hard Rock Albums (Billboard)	15
US Heatseekers Albums (Billboard)	6
US Independent Albums (Billboard)	37
US Top Rock Albums (Billboard)	48
