= The Urgency =

Studio album by Saving Grace
- Released: January 21, 2014
- Genres: Christian hardcore, metalcore, crossover thrash
- Length: 37:47
- Label: Facedown
- Producer: Zack Ohren

Saving Grace chronology
The King Is Coming (2011)	The Urgency (2014)

The Urgency is the fourth studio album from Saving Grace. Facedown Records released the album on January 21, 2014. Saving Grace worked with Zack Ohren, in the production of this album.

== Critical reception ==
Professional ratings
Review scores
Source	Rating
Christ Core	10/10
The Christian Music Review Blog	3.5/5 stars
Exclaim!	9/10
HM Magazine	4/5 stars
Indie Vision Music	4/5 stars
Jesus Freak Hideout	4.5/5 stars
Jesus Wired	4/5 stars
Kill Your Stereo	70/100

Awarding the album four stars from HM Magazine, David Stagg states, "The Urgency should be recommended listening for the new generation of hardcore." Trystan MacDonald, rating the album a nine out of ten at Exclaim!, writes, "Saving Grace takes no prisoners with their fifth album". Giving the album four and a half stars for Jesus Freak Hideout, Aaron Lambert says, "'a masterpiece." Lee Brown, awarding the album four stars by Indie Vision Music, describes, "The Urgency is heavy lyrically and musically, but it continues to point the listener towards the hope found in Christ."

Brad Johnson, giving the album three and a half stars by The Christian Music Review Blog, writes, "Saving Grace is a band that will stop at nothing to bring their message to the masses." Rating the album a ten out of ten for Christ Core, Phillip Noell states, "Fantastic! Enjoyable on every level". Alex Sievers, giving the album a 70 out of 100 from Kill Your Stereo, describes, "A decent slog through metalcore country." Awarding the album four stars from Jesus Wired, Justin Croteau says, "With all this the band has forced themselves to truly deliver on the new record entitled The Urgency, and trust me they don’t disappoint."

== Track listing ==
All lyrics are written by Saving Grace

No.	Title	Length
1.	"+0"	3:13
2.	"Like a Trainwreck"	2:28
3.	"1994"	1:53
4.	"Descent"	3:06
5.	"Horse Apples"	2:15
6.	"The Banks of Otara"	3:09
7.	"Was:Is" (featuring Tommy Green of Sleeping Giant and xDEATHSTARx)	2:26
8.	"Ceremony"	3:53
9.	"Anthem of the Underground"	3:48
10.	"Temple of the Snake"	3:05
11.	"The Man Who Painted the Pavement"	2:57
12.	"Ablaze"	3:52
13.	"The Urgency"	1:42
Total length:		37:47

== Credits ==
Saving Grace

- Nicholas Tautuhi - vocals
- Ross McDougall - guitar
- Vasely Sapunov - guitar
- George White - bass
- Shaun Anderson - drums

Additional Musicians

- Tommy Green - Guest Vocals on track 7

Production

- Dave Quiggle - Artwork
- Zack Ohren - Producer
