= Immortal (For Today album) =

Studio album by For Today
- Released: May 29, 2012
- Recorded: January 2012
- Genre: Metalcore
- Length: 37:28
- Label: Razor & Tie
- Producer: Will Putney

For Today chronology
Breaker (2010)	Immortal (2012)	Fight the Silence (2014)

Singles from Immortal
- 1. "Fearless" Released: March 6, 2012

Immortal is the fourth studio album by American Christian metalcore band For Today, released on May 29, 2012 through Razor & Tie Records.

The album debuted at No. 15 on the Billboard 200, with 14,700 copies sold in the first week, as well as No. 1 on both the Hard Rock Albums and the Top Christian Albums charts. It makes this the best sales and chart performance for the band.

== Track listing ==
No.	Title	Length
1.	"The King"	1:30
2.	"Fearless"	3:47
3.	"Stand Defiant"	3:44
4.	"Immortal"	3:55
5.	"The Call"	1:38
6.	"Foundation"	3:47
7.	"Open Eyes"	4:06
8.	"Under God" (featuring Tommy Green of Sleeping Giant)	3:51
9.	"Set Apart" (featuring Jake Luhrs of August Burns Red)	3:37
10.	"The Only Name" (featuring Sonny Sandoval of P.O.D.)	3:51
11.	"My Confession"	3:42
Total length:		37:28

== Personnel ==
For Today

- Mattie Montgomery – lead vocals
- Ryan Leitru – lead guitar, vocals
- Mike Reynolds- rhythm guitar
- Brandon Leitru – bass guitar
- David Morrison – drums, percussion

Additional musicians

- Tom Green (Sleeping Giant, xDEATHSTARx) – guest vocals on track 8
- Jake Luhrs (August Burns Red) – guest vocals on track 9
- Sonny Sandoval (P.O.D.) – guest vocals on track 10

Production

- Will Putney – producer, mixing, mastering
- Phill Mamula – cover art
