= Behold (My Epic album) =

Studio album by My Epic
- Released: December 10, 2013
- Genres: Christian rock, experimental rock, indie rock, post-rock
- Length: 52:50
- Label: Facedown
- Producer: Matt Goldman

My Epic chronology
Broken Voice (2011)	Behold (2013)	Viscera (2016)

Behold is the third studio album from Christian rock band My Epic. The album released on December 10, 2013 by Facedown Records, and Matt Goldman was the producer. This album had commercial charting successes, and it garnered critical acclamation.

== Critical reception ==
Professional ratings
Review scores
Source	Rating
Cross Rhythms	9/10 squares
HM Magazine	4.5/5 stars
Indie Vision Music	4/5 stars
Jesus Freak Hideout	4.5/5 stars
Jesus Wired	5/5 stars
Louder Than the Music	4/5 stars
Mind Equals Blown	9.5/10
Outburn	10/10

Behold garnered critical acclaim by music critics. William James of Outburn rated the album a perfect ten, and commented that when a listener put on a My Epic album they "will be transported to a euphoric and deep feeling of space and time exaggerated to a delightful extent." Also, James wrote that My Epic's "lyrical output makes even the most confident writer jealous, and their music violently and gently plucks your heartstrings into oblivion." At HM, Rob Houston proclaimed the album to be "nothing short of a masterpiece."

At Cross Rhythms, Ian Webber observing how "both beautiful and surprising as nuances jump out with every listen", and that "Lovers of mature progressive rock should investigate these 11 tracks; they are not to be missed." Lee Brown of Indie Vision Music and felt that the band brought something special to the table with respect to this album. At Jesus Freak Hideout, Aaron Lambert called the overall album "fantastic" and that the songwriting was "superb" and the lyricism was "masterful."

Austin Gordon of Mind Equals Blown wrote that My Epic has made some "cathartic, immensely powerful, and career-defining music." At Louder Than the Music, Jono Davies heralded the album as "well worth digging deeper into" because it features "real music." Chris Adam of Jesus Wired exclaiming that "Behold is more than just another music release. It is an intricately woven piece of art that will never cease to be a pleasure to listen to."

== Commercial performance ==
For the Billboard charting week of December 28, 2013, Behold was the seventh most sold album on the breaking-and-entry chart via the Heatseekers Albums, and it was the No. 26 most sold album on the Christian Albums chart.

== Track listing ==
All tracks are written by My Epic except for No. 8 co-written with Stephen Price and former band member Matt Doran.

Tracklist
No.	Title	Length
1.	"Arise"	4:14
2.	"Hail"	5:17
3.	"Curse"	5:17
4.	"Confession"	5:02
5.	"Royal"	4:55
6.	"Approach"	2:44
7.	"Liturgy"	4:26
8.	"Lament"	4:33
9.	"Zion"	6:38
10.	"Selah"	1:43
11.	"Arrive"	8:01
Total length:		52:50

== Charts ==
Chart (2013)	Peak position
US Top Christian Albums (Billboard)	26
US Heatseekers Albums (Billboard)	7
