= Behind Enemy Lines (album) =

Studio album by Saving Grace
- Released: April 22, 2008
- Genre: Christian metalcore, death metal, crossover thrash
- Length: 34:12
- Label: Harvest Earth Records
- Producer: Saving Grace

Saving Grace chronology
Upheld/Saving Grace (2006)	Behind Enemy Lines (2008)	Unbreakable (2010)

Behind Enemy Lines is the debut album by the Christian metalcore band, Saving Grace. It is the only album the band released signed under the label Harvest Earth Records.

== Critical reception ==
Professional ratings
Review scores
Source	Rating
Indie Vision Music	4.3
Sputnik Music	3.5/5 stars
Metal Archives	18/20

Reception for the album has been generally positive, though its tendency to veer into predictability has been pointed out.

Christian music website, New Release Tuesday praised the album, calling it "Bold, brutal and 100 percent in your face... an album which will have hardcore and metal kids alike craving more." Erik Thomas of Lastrites wrote "this kind of stuff has been done to death, but this is definitely one of the better examples I've heard, even more so considering the origin". Sputnik Music commented that though the album falls into the trap of being too repetitive, as is often the case with its genre, "this is a great band and album...the best part are the lyrics that advise listeners to believe in themselves no matter what."

== Track listing ==
No.	Title	Length
1.	"Behind Enemy Lines (Intro)"	1:38
2.	"For So Long..."	3:30
3.	"The Most Beautiful Promise"	5:16
4.	"A Poet's Burial"	3:25
5.	"Just a Second"	3:36
6.	"The Eye of the Storm (Interlude)"	3:33
7.	"...Even as I Bleed"	3:24
8.	"In Your Own Hands"	3:48
9.	"U Becoming You"	4:59
10.	"Last Chance to Dance (Outro)"	1:03
Total length:		34:12

== Credits ==
Saving Grace

- Nicholas Tauthi - Vocals
- Vasely Sapanov - Guitar
- George White - Bass
- Benjamin Davidson - Drums

Production

- Colin Davis - Mastering
- Dave Quiggle - Artwork
