= Fight the Silence =

Studio album by For Today
- Released: February 4, 2014
- Genre: Metalcore
- Length: 43:25
- Label: Razor & Tie
- Producer: Will Putney

For Today chronology
Immortal (2012)	Fight the Silence (2014)	Wake (2015)

Singles from Fight the Silence
- 1. "Fight the Silence" Released: November 11, 2013; 2. "Pariah"

Fight the Silence is the fifth studio album by American Christian metalcore band For Today. The album was released on February 4, 2014 through Razor & Tie.

== Critical reception ==
Professional ratings
Review scores
Source	Rating
About.com	2.5/5 stars
Alternative Press	3/5 stars
Christian Music Review	4.5/5 stars
The Christian Music Review Blog	4.5/5 stars
Cross Rhythms	7/10 squares
HM Magazine	3.5/5 stars
Indie Vision Music	4/5 stars
Jesus Freak Hideout	5/5 stars 4/5 stars 3.5/5 stars
Kill Your Stereo	77/100
New Release Tuesday	4/5 stars
Outburn	8/10

Fight the Silence received generally positive reception from the ratings and reviews of music critics. Danielle Deschamps of Outburn rated the album an eight-out-of-ten, saying that "Fight the Silence proves to be a heartfelt album saturated with sleepless guitars, honest lyrics, and a heavy sound guaranteed to stimulate the hearts and minds of listeners who battle the hard-hitting realities and bitter illusions that live within us all." In addition, Deschamps states that "Liberation and the means to release one's mind from looming fears and bitter agony thrive within Fight the Silence". At HM, Jordan Gonzalez rated the album three-and-a-half stars out of five, writing that the band "doesn't shine or break any new ground musically [...] Its lyrical content redeems it, shedding light on modern-day struggles too often ignored by the music industry," noting "perhaps, in the end, the stale music is excusable." Matt.S of Kill Your Stereo rated the album a seventy-seven out of 100, calling this "a solid album worth of attention."

At Indie Vision Music, Lee Brown rated the album four stars out of five, affirming that the release "will definitely satisfy", but it is not a groundbreaking album by the band, which he writes that the release is "a powerful and passionate album that is lyrically bold, musically aggressive, and goes one-step further than just wearing its message on its sleeve." At Jesus Freak Hideout, they gave four opinions on the album. Michael Weaver rated it a perfect five stars, indicating that "For Today have created a masterpiece." John Choquette rated it four stars, highlighting this as yet "another excellent chapter in the band's ever-growing and impressive catalog." Timothy Estabrooks rated the album three-and-a-half stars, stating that the second half is better than the first, however he states that the band "continue to do what they do best: generic metalcore with lots of eerily similar breakdowns coupled with compelling and passionate lyrics." Mark Rice rated it four stars, calling the album "subversive" on which the band "displays legitimate versatility integrating rock, metalcore, and melodic elements, and the production quality continues to be eons better than their Facedown days."

Steven Ecott of Cross Rhythms rated the album seven squares out of ten, remarking that "In truth there is nothing that really separates 'Fight The Silence' from the hundreds of other metalcore records that are released every year." At New Release Tuesday, Mary Nikkel rated the album four stars out of five, noting how the album has no "major innovations", yet believing it does contain all of the "best of hardcore and nu-metal industrial sensibilities to create a solid offering." Jay Heilman of Christian Music Review rated the album four-and-a-half stars, writing that the release "is sure to please the masses of crazy Christian metal-core and mainstream fans alike." At The Christian Music Review Blog, Brad Johnson rated the album four-and-a-half stars out of five, stating that this is "For Today's most cohesive, purposeful and comprehensive release yet."

However, About.com's Edward Banchs rated the album two-and-a-half out of five stars, cautioning that the album "sees the band falling into the traps of a stagnant evolution", and this causes the release to be "just too predictable." At Alternative Press, Kevin Stewart-Panko rated the album three stars out of five, noting that "these attempted injections come across as clumsy, simply because the band still lack the necessary skills in order to seamlessly synthesize outside influences into their metalcore comfort zone."

== Commercial performance ==
For the Billboard charting week of February 22, 2014, Fight the Silence was the No. 32 most sold album in the United States according to the Billboard 200 chart, with first week sales of around 10,500. It was also the No. 2 most sold album in the Christian Albums chart, and the No. 7 most sold album on the Top Rock Albums chart, while on the Hard Rock Albums chart it was the No. 2 most sold. The album was the No. 4 most sold on the Independent Albums chart. The album has sold 33,000 copies in the United States as of October 2015.

== Track listing ==
No.	Title	Length
1.	"Molotov"	3:29
2.	"Fight the Silence"	3:38
3.	"Pariah"	3:50
4.	"Reflections"	2:09
5.	"Break the Cycle" (featuring Matty Mullins of Memphis May Fire)	4:12
6.	"A Call to Arms"	3:46
7.	"For the Fallen"	5:05
8.	"Fatherless"	3:37
9.	"Dead to Rights"	3:30
10.	"One Voice"	3:56
11.	"Resonate"	1:34
12.	"Hated by the World"	4:39
Total length:		43:25

== Personnel ==
For Today

- Mattie Montgomery - lead vocals
- Ryan Leitru - lead guitar, clean vocals
- Sam Penner - rhythm guitar
- Brandon Leitru - bass guitar
- David Puckett - drums, percussion

Additional personnel

- Matty Mullins - guest vocals on "Break the Cycle"
- Nick Ingram - lead guitar on "Pariah"

Production

- Will Putney - producer, mixing, mastering, engineer
- Nick Ingram - additional engineering
- Randy LeBoeuf - additional engineering
- Andy Gomoll - additional editing
- Shawn Keith - management
- Matt Andersen - booking
- Jonathan Weiner - photography
- Daniel McBride - Design
- Tim Brennan - marketing
- Dylan Chenfeld - A&R

== Chart performance ==
Chart (2014)	Peak position
US Billboard 200	32
US Top Christian Albums (Billboard)	2
US Top Hard Rock Albums (Billboard)	2
US Independent Albums (Billboard)	4
US Top Rock Albums (Billboard)	7
