= Phoenix (Everything in Slow Motion album) =

Studio album by Everything in Slow Motion
- Released: December 10, 2013
- Genre: Hard rock
- Length: 50:21
- Label: Facedown
- Producer: Joshua Barber

Everything in Slow Motion chronology
Red (2012)	Phoenix (2013)	Laid Low (2016)

Phoenix is the debut studio album from Christian metal project Everything in Slow Motion by Shane Ochsner. The album released on December 10, 2013 by Facedown Records, and Joshua Barber was the producer. This album had commercial charting successes, and it garnered critical acclamation.

== Background ==
The album was released on December 10, 2013 by Facedown Records, and it was produced by Joshua Barber. This was the debut studio album from the Christian metal project by Shane Ochsner.

== Music and lyrics ==
Dan Slessor of Outburn said that "With a rich, epic sound shot through with crunchy riffs, ethereal atmospherics, and perfect melody that one moment whips and snarls, the next breaks your heart, Ochsner has created a record that bleeds with potent emotion."

== Style ==
The styles of music present on the album have been called the following: Hard rock, metalcore, indie rock, hardcore punk and post-hardcore.

== Critical reception ==
Professional ratings
Review scores
Source	Rating
Cross Rhythms	9/10 squares
Decoy Music	5/5 stars
HM Magazine	4.5/5 stars
Indie Vision Music	5/5 stars
Jesus Freak Hideout	4.5/5 stars
Jesus Wired	4.5/5 stars
Mind Equals Blown	8.5/10
Outburn	10/10

Phoenix garnered critical acclaim by music critics. Danny McMartin of Cross Rhythms rated the album nine squares out of ten, and stated that this is "An impressive end from a band which could be Christian rock's next serious contender." At HM, Justin Mabee rated the album four-and-a-half-stars, which the album was an HM Pick, and felt that the album was "definitely worth checking out" because it was "much more sophisticated and mature sound" than he was with Hands. Dan Slessor of Outburn rated it a perfect ten, and proclaimed this to be "a beautifully crafted, loving realized record, and anything Ochsner puts his name on from here on out is essential listening." At Indie Vision Music, Lee Brown rated the album a perfect five stars, and highlighted that the album "paints on the canvas of life a picture of a thousand words that somehow manages to bring together both the beauty of a Picasso with the raw and childlike grace of your little child’s first finger-painting." Aaron Lambert of Jesus Freak Hideout rated the album four-and-a-half stars, and affirmed that the material on the release was "even more ambitious and powerful" than his work with Hands, which makes this effort "essential listening, and one of the best albums of the year." At Mind Equal Blown, Tim Dodderidge rated the album an eight-and-a-half, and noted that "Phoenix is a beauty", which "strengthened" him saying this was "a rarity in music nowadays." Also, Dodderidge said of "Any record that connects is going to go a long way, and with this record doing so through such a rich, honest expanse, it makes me hope it can affect others the same way. That, in the grandest sense, is unity." Rick Gebhardt of Decoy Music rated it a perfect five stars, and wrote that "There are fewer and fewer bands that can truly provide such an emotional punch, which makes those that can, such as Everything in Slow Motion, stand out so much more." At Jesus Wired, Chris Adam rated the album four-and-a-half stars out of five, and stated that "Phoenix is nearly a perfect album with its only downfalls being the two tracks that can’t quite match the excellence of the rest of it."

== Commercial performance ==
For the Billboard charting week of December 28, 2013, Phoenix was the No. 15 most sold album on the breaking-and-entry chart via the Heatseekers Albums, and it was the No. 31 most sold album on the Christian Albums chart.

== Track listing ==
All tracks are written by Shane Ochsner except for No. 2 co-written with Christian Lindskog of Blindside and No. 10 co-written with Holly Ann.

Tracklist
No.	Title	Length
1.	"Get Out"	4:18
2.	"Speak" (featuring Christian Lindskog of Blindside)	4:43
3.	"Poison"	4:38
4.	"Most Days"	4:27
5.	"You Are"	4:01
6.	"Numbers"	6:45
7.	"The Fool"	4:33
8.	"Come Down"	4:43
9.	"Remember No More"	5:05
10.	"Proxima" (featuring Holly Ann)	7:08
Total length:		50:21

== Charts ==
Chart (2013)	Peak position
US Top Christian Albums (Billboard)	31
US Heatseekers Albums (Billboard)	15
