= Ekklesia (album) =

Studio album by For Today
- Released: April 1, 2008
- Recorded: Early 2007
- Studio: The Basement Studios, Winston-Salem, North Carolina; Bay City, Michigan
- Genre: Metalcore; deathcore
- Length: 40:16
- Label: Facedown
- Producer: Jamie King

For Today chronology
Your Moment, Your Life, Your Time (2006)	Ekklesia (2008)	Portraits (2009)

Professional ratings
Review scores
Source	Rating
Jesus Freak Hideout	4/5 stars

Ekklesia is the debut studio album by the American Christian metalcore band For Today. The album was released on April 1, 2008 through Facedown Records. A version of the album featuring their old lead singer has found its way onto the internet through the means of a blogspot page. The album includes 10 tracks with a range in different sounds from the metal genre as well as an instrumental track and intro. According to the liner notes, Matt Tyler, the band's former vocalist, is featured on "Redemption" and "A Higher Standard".

== Track listing ==
No.	Title	Length
1.	"Intro" (instrumental)	1:00
2.	"Infantry"	4:57
3.	"Redemption"	3:54
4.	"Agape"	4:00
5.	"Never Lose Sight of the Goals"	5:06
6.	"Instrumental" (instrumental)	2:14
7.	"Words of Hope"	4:01
8.	"Ready for the Fight"	4:13
9.	"A Higher Standard"	5:41
10.	"With a Passion Burning"	5:10
Total length:		40:16

== Personnel ==
For Today

- Mattie Montgomery – lead vocals
- Ryan Leitru - lead guitar
- Mike Reynolds - rhythm guitar
- Brandon Leitru - bass guitar
- David Morrison - drums, percussion

Additional musicians'

- Matt Tyler - guest vocals on "Redemption" and "A Higher Standard"

Production

- Produced, Engineered, Mixed, and mastered by Jamie King
- Artwork by Dave Quiggle
