= Laylow (disambiguation) =

Laylow may refer to:

- Laylow, the French rapper
- Laylow, the 2006 debut album by trip hop group cirKus
- Laylower, the 2007 second album by cirKus
- "Laylow", a song by British rock band the Darkness from the deluxe edition of their 2019 album Easter Is Cancelled
- Laylow, a location in Ladbroke Grove, London

== See also ==
- Lay Low (disambiguation)
