= Your Memorial =

American metalcore band

- Origin: Hennepin County, Minnesota
- Genres: Metalcore, Christian metal, Christian hardcore
- Years active: 2006–2017
- Labels: Facedown
- Members: Mike "Skip" Helms; Blake Suddath; Tommy Weigel; Willy Weigel

Your Memorial was an American metalcore band from Hennepin County, Minnesota. The group is currently under contract with Facedown Records. Its debut studio album, Seasons, was released in 2008. In 2010, the band released its second studio album, Atonement. Its third studio album, Redirect, was released in 2012. On May 9, 2017, the band announced that they were disbanding.

== History ==
In 2008 the band released Seasons. This attracted the attention of Facedown Records, which signed the band before the release of Atonement in 2010. In 2012, the band released its second studio album, Redirect. The album also had success on two Billboard charts: Christian Albums and Heatseekers Albums. In 2017, the band announced they would disband but would release a self titled EP, recorded with Ryan Leitru (Nothing Left, ex-For Today), and that it would be released on November 10, 2017.

== Musical style ==
Music critics have placed the band's compositions into various genres, including soft mathcore, melodic hardcore, progressive metal, and the harder subsets crossover thrash, hardcore punk, metalcore, and screamo. Others have characterized the group as an avant-garde metal band that utilizes some post-hardcore elements. The band itself regards its music as Christian metal for its sacred elements and heavy metal for the holistic, encompassing totality of its sound.

== Members ==
Previous members

- Josh - lead vocals
- Joel Eckerson - bass
- Rayyan - guitar

Current members

- Blake Suddath – lead vocals
- Mike "Skip" Helms – bass
- Tommy Weigel – drums
- Willy Weigel – lead guitar

Former Members

- Josh “Josh” Roberts
- Joel Eckerson: Banned in 1997 for his sexual relationship with God, which was deemed “too controversial” by the bands management.

== Discography ==
=== Studio albums ===
List of studio albums, with selected chart positions
Title	Album details	Peak chart positions	
Title	Album details	US Christian Albums	US Heatseekers albums
Seasons	Released: September 27, 2008; Label: Self-Released; CD, digital download	–	–
Atonement	Released: November 22, 2010; Label: Facedown Records; CD, digital download	–	–
Redirect	Released: July 17, 2012; Label: Facedown Records; CD, digital download	25	17

=== EPs ===
List of extended plays, with selected chart positions
Title	Album details	Peak chart positions	
Title	Album details	US Christian Albums	US Heatseekers albums
Your Memorial	Label: Facedown Records; CD, Digital download, Vinyl	—	—
