= Realis (album) =

Studio album by A Hope for Home
- Released: March 30, 2010
- Recorded: January 2010 at Red Room Studios and Robots Ate My Studio
- Genre: Sludge metal, post-metal
- Length: 51:09
- Label: Facedown
- Producer: Chris Common, Dan McCall, A Hope for Home

A Hope for Home chronology
The Everlasting Man (2008)	Realis (2010)	In Abstraction (2011)

Professional ratings
Review scores
Source	Rating
Absolute Punk	(88%)
Jesus Freak Hideout	3/5 stars
The New Review	4/5 stars
Sputnikmusic	4.5/5 stars
Under The Gun	9/10 stars

Realis is the third studio album by A Hope for Home. It was released on March 30, 2010 through Facedown Records.

== Writing and recording ==
The band began the writing for Realis in September 2009 in a practice space in Beaverton, Oregon. Written in half the time of their previous album, The Everlasting Man, Realis was "a lot more focused and cohesive".

Speaking of the album, guitarist and vocalist Matthew Ellis stated:

The first half [of the album] is dark and hopeless and bleak. It’s from the perspective of a man living in a world with no meaning, based around the Nietzsche quote ‘God is dead.’ The second half of the record shows the man building his beliefs from the ground up. Our goal is to address all the doubts/questions/realizations that everyone has because it’s unrealistic to paint the picture that everything is good all the time.

Ellis also stated:

It is a deeply personal record and it’s laced with doubt and fear, but I'm really proud of what we did with it and my goal is that it would stand on its own after the lights and frenzy of sermon at a hardcore show die down.

The album was recorded throughout January 2010 at the "Red Room Studios" in Seattle, WA and at "Robots Ate My Studio" in Camas, Washington. For the drum tracking and mixing of the record, A Hope for Home recruited the help of drummer Chris Common (These Arms Are Snakes). Ellis stated, "Chris is such an amazing producer and it was such a blessing to be able to work with him. He runs a studio in Seattle with my favorite producer, Matt Bayles, and those guys have done records by bands like Botch and Isis, and it was insane to work with them".

== Track listing ==
All lyrics are written by A Hope for Home; all music is composed by A Hope for Home.

No.	Title	Length
1.	"Nightfall"	4:18
2.	"The Overman"	3:06
3.	"Withering Branches"	3:40
4.	"The Machine Stops"	4:05
5.	"No Light"	4:38
6.	"Post Tenebras Lux"	5:52
7.	"First Light of Dawn"	4:24
8.	"The Crippling Fear"	4:08
9.	"The Warmth of the Heavens"	2:16
10.	"Seasons"	5:06
11.	"Ascension"	6:36
12.	"After"	3:43
Total length:		51:09

== Personnel ==
A Hope for Home

- Nathan Winchell – vocals
- Matthew Ellis – guitar, vocals
- Tanner Morita – guitar
- Dan McCall – bass
- Lance Taylor – drums
- Eric Gerrard - keyboard, programming

Additional musicians

- Jacek Gillespie - vocals on "First Light of Dawn"

Production

- Produced by Dan McCall
- Vocals, guitars, and pianos recorded by Dan McCall
- Drum tracking and mixing by Chris Common
- Mastered by Troy Glessner

Artwork

- Art direction A Hope for Home
- Art design by Tanner Morita
