= My Epic =

American Christian rock band

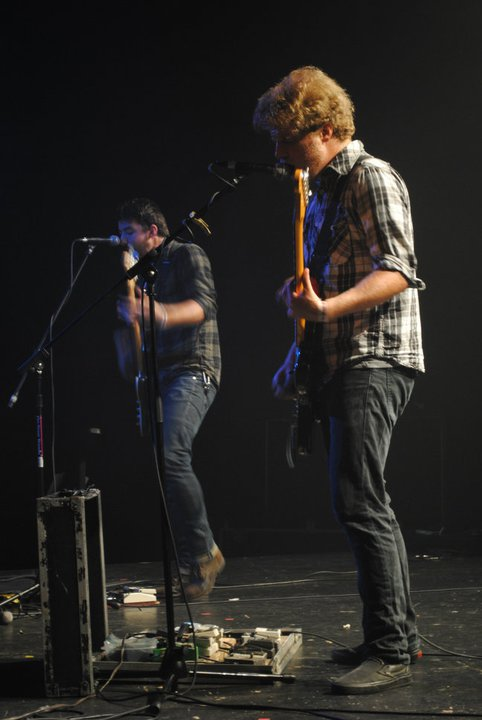
- My Epic performing on July 11, 2011.

Background information
- Origin: Charlotte, North Carolina, U.S.
- Genres: Christian rock; indie rock; experimental rock; hard rock; post-hardcore
- Years active: 2005–present
- Labels: Facedown, Tooth & Nail
- Members: Aaron Stone; Tanner Morita; Nate Washburn
- Past members: Jesse Stone; Jeremiah Austin; Matt Doran
- Website: myepicrock.com

My Epic is an American Christian rock band from Charlotte, North Carolina started in 2005. They released an independent EP in 2006 entitled This Is Rescue, and two successive albums and one EP with Dreamt Records entitled I Am Undone (2008), Yet (2010) and 2011's Broken Voice EP. In 2013, the band released their debut album with Facedown Records entitled Behold that has seen commercial success.

== Background ==
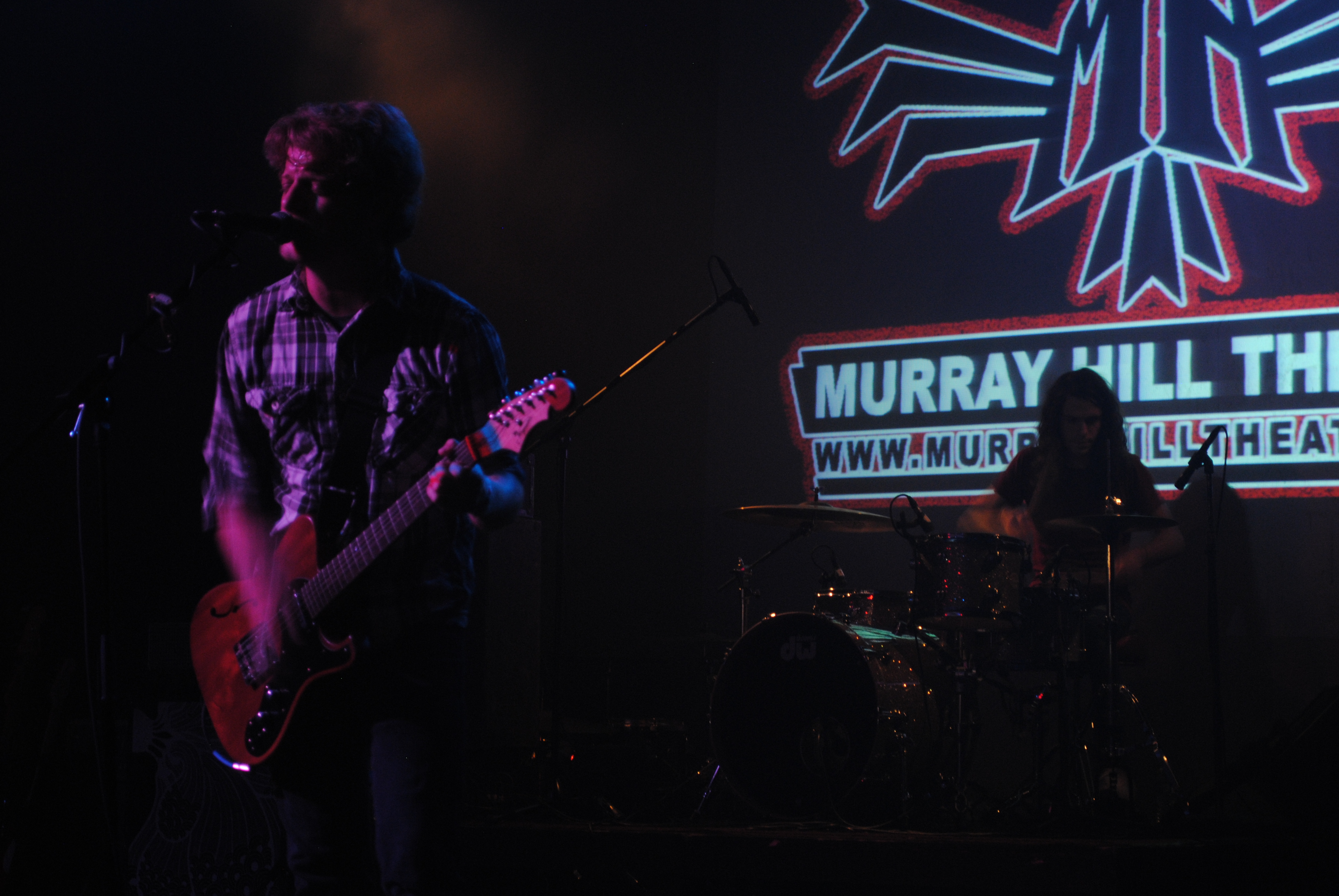
Aaron Stone (left) and Jesse Stone (right).

The members of My Epic began working together as early as 1998, under the name the Right Wing Conspiracy, which later became Shaddai. It wasn't until 2004, after the band played their first successful show before a few hundred fans, did the band become My Epic. At the time, the band was composed of three members: Aaron Stone handled lead vocals and electric guitar, while his younger brother Jesse played drums, and Jeremiah Austin played bass. They recorded an untitled demo in 2005 five that consisted of four songs; the band recently made this demo available online as a free download. The following year, the band independently recorded their first EP, This Is Rescue. My Epic's first full-length studio album came in 2008, entitled I Am Undone. It was released through Dreamt Music, an imprint of Facedown Record. The band returned to the studio in 2010 to record their spectacular follow-up album, Yet. After this 2010 release, Jesse Stone left the band to pursue personal matters. To record their third studio album, Broken Voice, in 2011, My Epic brought in Tanner Morita, of A Hope for Home, to play bass and Matt Doran to play drums, thus evolving the band into a four-piece. Following this release, Doran departed, and Stone returned to the band to play drums. Jeremiah Austin also returned to the band to play bass, thus shifting Tanner Morita to electric guitar and keyboard. Now with their original line-up intact, with the addition of Morita, the band transferred to Facedown Records in 2013 to record and release Behold, their third studio album. The band shifted to releasing EPs, starting with Viscera in 2016. In 2018, the band released Ultraviolet, the first in a pair of EPs. The second EP, Violence, came out the following year. In 2024, the band announced they had signed with Tooth & Nail Records, released the single Northstar, and announced a new album, titled Loriella, which is slated to be released in June 2024.

== Music ==
The band were on Dreamt Records from 2008–11 and released two albums and one EP, and 2013 the band released their first album with Facedown Records.

=== Independent EP ===
The band released one independent EP in 2006 entitled This Is Rescue.

=== Studio work ===
The band released their first studio album I Am Undone on August 5, 2008, with Dreamt Records, as well as, and their second Yet on July 6, 2010. Also, they released commercially successful Broken Voice EP on July 5, 2011 with Dreamt Records. The bands' first album with Facedown Records entitled Behold that released on December 10, 2013 saw success on the Billboard Christian Albums and Heatseekers Albums charts at Nos. 26 and 7 respectively.

== Members ==
Current members

- Aaron Stone – vocals, guitar (2005–present)
- Tanner Morita – bass guitar (2010-2011) guitar, keyboard, backing vocals (2011–present)
- Nate Washburn – guitars (2017–present)

Former members

- Jeremiah Austin – bass guitar (2005-2010, 2011–2024)
- "Cousin" Matt Doran – drums (2010-2011)
- Jesse Stone – drums, backing vocals (2005-2010, 2011–2024)

Touring musicians

- Jordan McGee (Advent) – drums (2016)
- Alex Camarena (Silent Planet, Nothing Left) – drums (2019)

== Discography ==
=== Independent EPs ===
- This Is Rescue (2006)

=== Studio EPs ===
List of studio albums, with selected chart positions
Title	Album details	Peak chart positions			
Title	Album details	US Christ	US Heat	US Rock	US Hard Rock
Broken Voice	Released: July 5, 2011; Label: Dreamt Records; Formats: CD, digital download	20	19	—	—
Viscera	Released: May 6, 2016; Label: Facedown Records; Formats: CD, digital download	21	6	48	15
Ultraviolet	Released: March 30, 2018; Label: Facedown Records; Formats: CD, digital download, LP	37	10	—	—
Violence	Released: May 10, 2019; Label: Facedown Records; Formats: CD, digital download, LP	39	7	—	—

=== Studio albums ===
List of studio albums, with selected chart positions
Title	Album details	Peak chart positions	
Title	Album details	US Christ	US Heat
I Am Undone	Released: 2008; Label: Dreamt Music; Formats: CD, digital download, vinyl	—	—
Yet	Released: 2010; Label: Dreamt Music; Formats: CD, digital download, vinyl	—	21
Behold	Released: December 10, 2013; Label: Facedown Records; Formats: CD, digital download, vinyl	26	7
Loriella	Released: June 28, 2024; Label: Tooth & Nail Records; Formats: CD, digital download, vinyl	—	—
