= In Abstraction =

Album by A Hope for Home

Studio album by A Hope for Home
- Released: December 6, 2011
- Recorded: August–September 2011 at London Bridge Studios and Robots Ate My Studio
- Genre: Post-metal; Post-rock; Experimental rock Sludge metal
- Length: 53:02
- Label: Facedown
- Producer: Dan McCall

A Hope for Home chronology
Realis (2010)	In Abstraction (2011)	Years of Silicon (2022)

Professional ratings
Review scores
Source	Rating
Indie Vision Music	3.0/5 stars

In Abstraction is the 4th studio album by the American band A Hope for Home. It was released on December 6, 2011, through Facedown Records.

== Track listing ==
All lyrics are written by A Hope for Home; all music is composed by A Hope for Home.

No.	Title	Length
1.	"Calm"	8:54
2.	"Out of Ruin, Misery"	9:07
3.	"Firewind"	6:16
4.	"Tides"	7:51
5.	"The House Where You Were Born"	5:35
6.	"Weaved"	5:54
7.	"Everything That Rises Must Converge"	9:33
Total length:		51:39

== Personnel ==
A Hope for Home

- Nathan Winchell – vocals
- Matthew Ellis – guitar, vocals
- Tanner Morita – guitar
- Dan McCall – bass
- Lance Taylor – drums
- Eric Gerrard - keyboard, programming
