= Portraits (For Today album) =

Studio album by For Today
- Released: June 9, 2009
- Recorded: 2009
- Studio: The Basement Studios, Winston-Salem, North Carolina
- Genre: Metalcore
- Length: 32:57
- Label: Facedown
- Producer: Jamie King

For Today chronology
Ekklesia (2008)	Portraits (2009)	Breaker (2010)

Professional ratings
Review scores
Source	Rating
Jesus Freak Hideout	3.5/5 stars

Portraits is the second studio album by American Christian metalcore band For Today, released on June 9, 2009. The album charted on three of Billboard's charts; No. 14 on Top Heatseekers, No. 15 on Christian Albums, and No. 40 on Top Independent Albums.

== Track listing ==
No.	Title	Length
1.	"Immanuel (The Challenger)"	0:45
2.	"Saul of Tarsus (The Messenger)"	3:47
3.	"Nicodemus (The Seeker)"	3:18
4.	"Joel (The Watchman)"	4:08
5.	"Immanuel (The Redeemer)"	2:36
6.	"Elijah (The Forerunner)"	3:11
7.	"Benedictus (Song of Zechariah)"	2:51
8.	"Ezekiel (The Visionary)"	4:07
9.	"Isaiah (The Willing)"	4:03
10.	"Talmidim (The Servants)"	4:09
Total length:		32:53

== Personnel ==
For Today

- Mattie Montgomery – lead vocals
- Ryan Leitru - lead guitar, clean vocals (on tracks 8 and 10)
- Mike Reynolds - rhythm guitar
- Brandon Leitru - bass guitar
- David Morrison - drums, percussion

Production

- Produced, Engineered, Mixed, and mastered by Jamie King
- Artwork by Dave Quiggle
- Guest vocals on "Immanuel (The Redeemer)" by Joe Musten from Advent
- Additional guitar on "Benedictus (Song Of Zechariah)" by Dustie Waring from Between The Buried And Me
