= Out of Darkness (album) =

Studio album by In the Midst of Lions
- Released: May 26, 2009
- Genre: Christian metal, deathcore
- Length: 24:13
- Label: Strike First

In the Midst of Lions chronology
Out of Darkness (2009)	The Heart of Man (2010)

Out of Darkness is the first studio album from In the Midst of Lions. Strike First Records released the album on May 26, 2009.

== Critical reception ==
Professional ratings
Review scores
Source	Rating
Indie Vision Music	4/5 stars
Jesus Freak Hideout	3.5/5 stars

Awarding the album three and a half stars from Jesus Freak Hideout, Scott Fryberger states, "despite the album's brevity, the seven full songs definitely give the listener a good look into who they are, musically and lyrically." Chris W., giving the album four stars for Indie Vision Music, writes, "One of the best praise and worship based metal releases available. This debut is sure to bring scene wide recognition to In The Midst Of Lions not just for its music, but for its message as well."

== Track listing ==
No.	Title	Length
1.	"Awaken the Dawn (Intro)"	0:40
2.	"Tongues of Fire"	3:01
3.	"Out of Darkness"	2:23
4.	"The Field of Blood"	3:05
5.	"Paid in Full"	3:10
6.	"Manifesto"	2:22
7.	"I: Crucifixion & Burial"	0:58
8.	"II: He Is Risen"	3:13
9.	"Herod's Demise"	4:23
10.	"Into the Light (Outro)"	0:57
Total length:		24:13
