= Laid Low =

EP by Everything in Slow Motion
- Released: April 22, 2016
- Genre: Christian rock; post-rock; experimental rock
- Length: 22:15
- Label: Facedown

Everything in Slow Motion chronology
Phoenix (2013)	Laid Low (2016)

Laid Low is the second extended play from Everything in Slow Motion. Facedown Records released the EP on April 22, 2016.

== Critical reception ==
Professional ratings
Review scores
Source	Rating
Jesus Freak Hideout	3.5/5 stars

David Craft states, "While every song on Laid Low is very good, things somehow never quite come together in a cohesive manner. This EP more or less seems to be a random collection of experimental songs rather than a consolidated project. Regardless, the album's softer elements in no way detract from Laid Low's excellence, instead revealing EISM's potential to break into other genres should they continue on this path."

HMMagazine gave a positive review, stating "Laid Low serves as an abbreviated illustration of the band’s various compelling modes", with the primary negative being the absence of a single headliner song of as high a quality as their past work.

== Track listing ==
No.	Title	Length
1.	"Coma"	4:24
2.	"Bad Season"	4:52
3.	"I Am Laid Low"	4:18
4.	"Runaway"	4:55
5.	"Capella"	3:45
Total length:		22:15

== Personnel ==
EISM

- Shane Oschner – vocals, guitars, bass

Guest musician

- Miles McPherson – drums (ex-Paramore, ex-MATSOD)

Production

- Josh Barber – producer
- Dave Quiggle – artwork

== Chart performance ==
Chart (2016)	Peak position
US Christian Albums (Billboard)	40
US Heatseekers Albums (Billboard)	23
