= Saving Grace (band) =

New Zealand Christian metal band

- Also known as: Marky and the Boys
- Origin: Gisborne, New Zealand
- Genres: Christian metal, metalcore, melodic death metal, groove metal
- Years active: 2005–2019, 2022–present
- Labels: Harvest Earth; Facedown; Strike First; Deadboy; Universal
- Members: Josh Bain; Mike Benson; Vasely Sapunov; George White; Shaun Anderson
- Past members: Nicholas Tahana Tautuhi; Ross McDougall; Andrew Savage; Benjamin Clement; Bruce Reid; Mark Stichbury; Benjamin Davidson; Ryan Wilson
- Website: Saving Grace on Facebook

Saving Grace is a Christian metal band from Gisborne, New Zealand. They were the first foreign band to sign to Strike First Records. Their album, The Urgency, debuted at No. 3 on the New Zealand Top 20 albums chart alongside multi-platinum sellers Lorde and Sole Mio and also debuted at No. 57 on the Billboard Hard Music Chart and No. 59 on the Billboard Heatseekers Chart in the United States.

== History ==
The band started in 2005 with Nick Tauthi, Vasely Sapunov, Bruce Reid, and Mark Stichbury as Marky and the Boys, but later changed it to Saving Grace. Stichbury and Reid left soon after, and were replaced by Benjamin Davidson and Andrew Savage. Savage quit and was replaced by Benjamin Clement. Clement left and was replaced by George White. The band recorded their debut album, Behind Enemy Lines in 2008.

In 2010, the band recorded Unbreakable and released their first music video for the title song and, "Oaxaca". Davidson left the band and was replaced by Ryan Wilson. Wilson left a year later and was replaced by Shaun Anderson. Mike Benson took over bass in 2010 and White took over Rhythm Guitar. In 2011, they recorded their third album, The King Is Coming and released two new music videos for "Shekinah" and "The First Woe".

Benson left the band in 2014, and Ross McDougall joined the band on guitar, with White taking over bass again. The band recorded their fourth and most highly appreciated album, The Urgency in 2014. On 19 August 2016 the band premiered a video for the first single off of their upcoming album, Into Hell, entitled "Recidivist". On 27 June 2019 Saving Grace announced their disbanding and that there would be no final shows.

On April 20, 2022 the band announced that they have reunited and are working on a new album and planning a New Zealand tour with the TKIC-era lineup.

== Media ==
The band was the cover story of the HM Magazine issue for January 2014 in The HM Awards Issue, and band was profiled in a nine-page spread in the issue.

== Influences ==
The band stated their influences as Arkangel, Reprisal, Cannibal Corpse, Pantera, Slayer, Sepultura, Earth Crisis, Biohazard, Heaven Shall Burn, Maroon, Wu-Tang Clan, as well as, Zao, Living Sacrifice, and Society's Finest.

== Members ==
Current

- Mike Benson – bass (2010–2012, 2022–present)
- Vasely Sapunov – guitars (2005–2019, 2022–present)
- George White – bass (2007–2010, 2012–2019), guitars (2010–2012, 2022–present)
- Shaun "Drum Ferret" Anderson – drums (2011–2019, 2022–present)
- Josh Bain - vocals (2023 - present)

Former

- Nicholas Tautuhi - vocals (2005 - 2019, 2022—2023)
- Ross McDougall – guitars (2012–2019)
- Andrew Savage – bass (2006)
- Benjamin "Little Ben" Clement – bass (2006–2007)
- Bruce Reid – bass (2005–2006)
- Mark Stichbury – drums (2005–2006)
- Benjamin "Big Ben" "Papa Bear" Davidson – drums (2006–2010)
- Ryan Wilson – drums (2010–2011)
- Keiren Walshe
- Simon Power
- Mike Main

Timeline

== Discography ==
Studio albums

- Behind Enemy Lines (2008; Harvest Earth)
- Unbreakable (2010; Strike First)
- The King Is Coming (2011; Facedown)
- The Urgency (2014; Facedown)
- Into Hell (unreleased)

EPs

- Saving Grace (2005; EP)
- Upheld / Saving Grace (2006; Split EP)
- Now This War Has Two Sides (2011; Split EP)

Music videos

- "Unbreakable" (2010)
- "Oaxaca" (2011)
- "Shekinah" (2012)
- "The First Woe" (2012)
- "Anthem of the Underground" (2016)
- "Recidivist" (2016)

Singles

- "Shekinah" (2011)
- "Habakkuk" (2011)
- "1994" (2014)
- "Ablaze" (2014)
- "Recidivist" (19 August 2016)
