= A Hope for Home =

Post-metal band from Portland, Oregon

- Origin: Portland, Oregon, U.S.
- Genres: Post-hardcore, post-metal, post-rock
- Years active: 2006-present
- Label: Facedown
- Members: Nathan Winchell; Matthew Ellis; Dan McCall; Eric Gerard; Lance Taylor
- Past members: Tanner Morita; Kyle Cooke; Todd Farr; Ian Vidovic; James McGaha
- Website: https://ahopeforhome.bandcamp.com/

A Hope for Home (commonly abbreviated to AHFH) is a post-metal band based in Portland, Oregon that formed in 2006. They have five studio albums, three of which were released on Facedown Records and Strike First (the imprint label of Facedown Records). Throughout their career, A Hope for Home has controlled many of the aspects of their music including recording, production, mixing, art direction, and art design. These commitments have allowed them to achieve the precise sound and imagery of their intentions, and have become part of the band's dynamic.

== History ==
Founded in 2006 by friends Kyle Cooke and Matthew Ellis, "A Hope for Home" was a project devised by Cooke after discovering that his cancer had returned and was terminal.

We all started out in local bands in high school. I (Matthew Ellis) stopped playing music and went off to college, but the guy who I was always playing guitar with (Kyle Cooke) called me up and said he had terminal cancer. He said I should move home so we could start a new band. I suddenly felt like I would much rather be playing music, and that's what I was supposed to do. So, I moved back home and we started A Hope for Home.

After a long struggle with cancer, founding member Kyle Cooke died on August 5, 2006. After his death, friends and family members of Cooke created the "Kyle Cooke Foundation", a "non-profit fundraising corporation that raises money for The Friends of Doernbecher Foundation and the people of the Camas and Washougal community on a need by need basis".

Kyle Cooke playing at the Noisebox in 2006

On their website is a post stating the following:

Our message is simple, Believe in Hope. No matter what you are going through in your life, there is always hope. Kyle battled cancer for 6 years of his life, and lived far longer than he was ever expected. He never stopped fighting, and didn't give into hopelessness. He lived a full life through it all, and used the pain and hardships that he was going through for a much higher purpose. Hopelessness can easily take over when we are in overwhelming circumstances and it takes real strength to overcome it. Kyle found hope through his faith in God and through the love from the people in his life. When it comes down to it, those are the things that can keep you going, no matter what life throws your way. So the best way you can support our message, is be somebody's hope, help them through whatever they are going through, just like Kyle did. Thank you. Much love & God bless, The Kyle Cooke Foundation.

"Kyle"
A sample of the song "Kyle", from their debut album.

A Hope for Home has since continued with new members, while still bearing the name created by Kyle Cooke as a remembrance of their formation. In 2007, A Hope for Home entered the home studio of bassist Dan McCall (Robots Ate My Studio) and recorded their first album Here, the End. The track "Kyle" off of the album was written for Kyle Cooke by Matthew Ellis, and in the liner notes of the album there are words stating that the entire album is dedicated to the memory of Kyle Cooke. After releasing Here, the End in 2007, A Hope for Home gained local praise and began building their fan base by playing routinely at local venues such as The Noisebox in Camas, Wa and the Satyricon nightclub in Portland, OR.

After several months of touring for Here, the End, A Hope for Home re-entered the studio to begin recording their next album.

On December 4, 2008 the band announced via their Purevolume page that they had signed to Strike First Records (the imprint label for Facedown Records). "After 2 years of being a 100% DIY group we have finally been given an awesome chance to take the next step in the industry, and we can't be more excited".

"Absolution: Of Flight And Failure"
A sample of the song "Absolution: Of Flight And Failure", from their sophomore album.

The Everlasting Man was released on January 20, 2009 on Strike First Records. The title of the album is taken from the G. K. Chesterton nonfiction work of the same name. The Everlasting Man added more atmospheric textures to their sound, using many different guitar effects and tones woven together with electronic backgrounds while still holding a strong drum and bass foundation. In an interview with Indie Vision Music, Keyboardist Eric Gerrard explained that "We wanted to sing about and affirm value in things that aren't often talked about in the current scene today" and that "a lot of our ideas lined up with what Chesterton talks about in the book (The Everlasting Man)".

"The Machine Stops"
A sample of the song "The Machine Stops", from their third album.

In September 2009 after several months of touring A Hope for Home announced that drummer Ian Vidovic would be leaving the band to pursue his other musical projects "Roads" and international touring with "The New Divide".

After the departure of Vidovic, A Hope for Home entered a practice space in Beaverton, Oregon (recruiting the help of fellow drummer Lance Taylor) and began writing Realis, their third album to date. Throughout January 2010 A Hope for Home recorded at the "Red Room Studios" in Seattle, Washington and "Robots Ate My Studio" in Camas, WA. The album was produced by bassist Dan McCall, mastered by Troy Glessner at "Spectre Mastering", and featured art direction and design by guitarist Tanner Morita. Realis, a concept album about the search for meaning in a seemingly meaningless world, was a drastic change in the band's musical style. Far from the "breakdowns", "dance parts", and "double bass" of their previous records, Realis brought song structures and instrumentation that clearly indicated their Post and Sludge metal influences (Envy, Cult Of Luna, Isis). The album was well received by many music review sites (Absolute Punk, The New Review, Indie Vision Music).

On September 10, 2011 the band announced via their Facebook page that they had finished their fourth official album titled "In Abstraction", and that it is set to be released on December 6, 2011 on Facedown Records. On November 25, 2011 the band played a cd release show for In Abstraction at the local Portland, OR Rotture-Branx venue complex along with local artists Tribes, Tiny Dads, Amos Val, My Mantle, and Kye Kye.

In January 2022, the band announced via their Twitter account that they had entered the studio to record their first album in over 10 years, set to be released in 2022.

== Genre and influences ==
Often described as Post-hardcore, A Hope for Home covers many other genres including Sludge metal, Post-rock, Post-metal, Alternative, and Experimental rock. With their debut album Here, The End, some of the band's more Metalcore and Melodic hardcore influences can be heard. After the release of The Everlasting Man, the band developed a far more atmospheric and electric sound. The band's third album, Realis, defined a significant change in the bands direction towards their Sludge metal and Post-metal influences. Perhaps one of the best examples of this is the guitar riff heard at 3:06 on the song "The Machine Stops", which gives a direct indication of Panopticon era Isis.

A Hope for Home has a wide variety of influences, the following are some that have been mentioned by the band. Cult of Luna, Isis, Envy, Thrice, This Will Destroy You, Sigur Rós, Mono, Thursday, Underoath, Death Cab for Cutie. On the subject of the band's influences, Keyboardist Eric Gerrard stated "bands like those that aren't limited to one genre and continue to grow throughout their careers".

== Band members ==
Current

- Nathan Winchell – vocals
- Matthew Ellis – guitar, vocals
- Dan McCall – bass
- Eric Gerrard – keyboards, programming
- Lance Taylor – drums

Former

- Tanner Morita – guitar (My Epic)
- Kyle Cooke – guitar
- Todd Farr – guitar, vocals
- James McGaha - guitar
- Ian Vidovic – drums

== Discography ==
- Here, the End (2007)
- The Everlasting Man (2008)
- Realis (2010)
- In Abstraction (2011)
- Years of Silicon (2022)

== Videography ==
- "Iniquity: An Offering" (The Everlasting Man)
