= Hands (metal band) =

American Christian metal band

- Origin: Fargo, North Dakota, U.S.
- Genres: Sludge metal, metalcore, post-metal
- Years active: 2007–2011, 2017–present
- Labels: Facedown, Oort
- Past members: Shane Ochsner; Josh Silbernagel; Chris Schwartz; Jerik Hendrickson; Ian Johnson
- Website: myspace.com/wearehands

Hands was an American Christian metal band from Fargo, North Dakota, United States. The band started making music in 2007, with lead vocalist and guitarist Shane Ochsner, lead guitarist Ian Johnson, bass guitarist Chris Schwartz, and drummer Josh Silbernagel. Jerik Hendrickson became the band's lead guitarist in 2010, but he has since left the band, with Shane Ochsner taking over lead guitar duties. The band released one extended play, The Everlasting, independently in 2007. Their first studio album, The Sounds of Earth, was released by Oort Records in 2009. The band signed with Facedown Records, where they released Creator, a studio album, in 2009. The third studio album, Give Me Rest, was released in 2011, also on Facedown Records. The band reunited in 2017 for Facedown Fest 2017.

== Background ==
Hands was a Christian metal band from Fargo, North Dakota. Their members at its inception in 2007, were lead vocalist and guitarist, Shane Ochsner, lead guitarist Jerik Hendrickson, bass guitarist Chris Schwartz, and drummer Josh Silbernagel. Their lead guitarist became Ian Johnson in 2010, yet he is no longer with the group as Shane Ochsner is the present lead guitarist.

== Music history ==
The band commenced as a musical entity in 2007, with their first release, The Everlasting, an extended play, that they released independently in 2007. They released a studio album, The Sounds of Earth, on February 24, 2009, with Oort Records. They signed to Facedown Records, where they released another studio album, Creator, on July 21, 2009. Their third studio album, Give Me Rest, released by Facedown Records on July 5, 2011.

== Members ==
Final line-up

- Shane Ochsner - vocals, guitar
- Josh Silbernagel - drums
- Chris Schwartz - bass

Former

- Jerik Hendrickson (until 2010) - guitar
- Ian Johnson - guitar
- Craig Carlson - guitar

== Discography ==
Studio albums

- The Sounds of Earth (February 24, 2009, Oort Records)
- Creator (July 21, 2009, Facedown)
- Give Me Rest (July 5, 2011, Facedown)

EPs

- The Everlasting (June 24, 2008, Independent)
- New Heaven / New Earth (February 3, 2017, Facedown)
