= For Today =

American Christian metalcore band

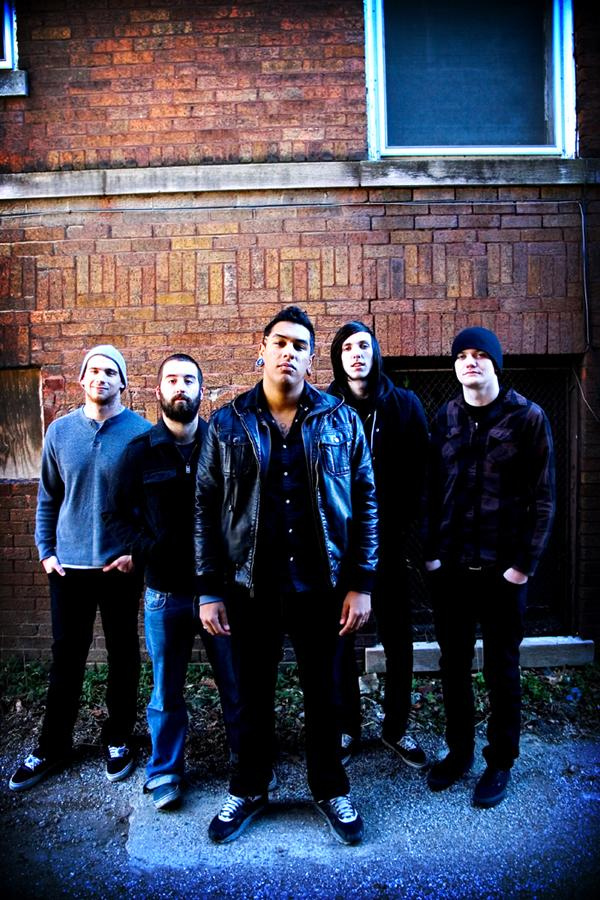
- For Today from left to right: Mike Reynolds, David Morrison, Mattie Montgomery, Brandon Leitru, Ryan Leitru

Background information
- Origin: Sioux City, Iowa, U.S.
- Genres: Metalcore; Christian metal
- Years active: 2005–2016
- Labels: Facedown, Razor & Tie, Nuclear Blast
- Past members: Ryan Leitru; Mattie Montgomery; Brandon Leitru; David Puckett; Jim Hughes; Matt Tyler; Jon Lauters; Brennan Schaeuble; David Morrison; Mike Reynolds; Sam Penner

For Today were an American Christian metalcore band from Sioux City, Iowa, formed in 2005. They released two EPs, Your Moment, Your Life, Your Time and Prevailer, and six full-length albums: Ekklesia in, 2008, Portraits in 2009, Breaker in 2010, Immortal in 2012, Fight the Silence in 2014, and Wake in 2015.

The band split up in 2016.

== History ==
For Today was founded in 2005 by Ryan Leitru, Mike Reynolds, David Morrison, and Jon Lauters. Lauters and vocalist Matt Tyler, who joined the band shortly after its formation, (who later became known as Madison Skylights) left the band soon after, and were replaced by Mattie Montgomery (formerly of Besieged) and Brennan Schaeuble. Schaeuble was replaced by Ryan's brother Brandon. On April 1, 2008, they released their first studio album, produced by Facedown Records, Ekklesia (a Biblical term from the Koine Greek that typically denotes the collective people of God; it is usually translated as 'the Body of Christ' or 'the Church'). Their second album, Portraits, was released on June 9, 2009, on the same label, and peaked at No. 15 of the Billboard Christian albums chart. Different Biblical personalities are portrayed on the album: the Prophets Ezekiel, Joel, Elijah and Isaiah, and Nicodemus the Pharisee, Zacharias, Saul (Paul) of Tarsus and Immanuel (Jesus). The final track on the album, 'Talmidim' (which denotes the disciples of a rabbi, here referring to all disciples of Jesus -Christians) quotes Ezekiel 36:26-28 and describes what it means to be a Christian.

Upon signing with Razor & Tie, the band was in the recording studio on January 6, 2012 until February 8, 2012 at The Machine Shop in New Jersey. They also announced that Will Putney, who had produced their previous release Breaker, would produce this album. The album's first single, "Fearless", was released on March 6, 2012. They headlined the Fight the Silence Tour based on their new album in March 2012 and toured alongside A Skylit Drive, Stick to Your Guns, MyChildren MyBride, and Make Me Famous. The new album, Immortal, was released on May 29, 2012. They played at Warped Tour 2012.

On June 15, 2012, it was announced that drummer David Morrison had stepped down from For Today to do missionary work in South America with Extreme Nazarene Ministries. David Puckett (formerly of The Crimson Armada) was announced as the new drummer. Rhythm guitarist Mike Reynolds also left the band in early 2013, in order for him and his wife to enroll in Bible college and work toward full-time missions work in the Middle East. This announcement came after controversial comments that Reynolds made on Twitter in which he said "There was no such thing as a homosexual Christian." The backlash sparked by his comments prompted action by Mattie Montgomery, who posted a response on YouTube where he gave his phone number and offered his heart and time to anyone who wanted to talk about what had been said, pray, vent about religion, or just seek advice. Reynolds was replaced by former In the Midst of Lions guitarist Sam Penner.

On April 2, 2013, the band released a new EP, Prevailer, with four new songs, one acoustic track, and a DVD, of live band footage and a documentary of the band's history.

On October 24, 2013, the band released a new video, "Fight the Silence", on their official YouTube channel. According to the description of the video, the band will be releasing a new album in 2014. They joined We Came as Romans, Texas in July, Woe, Is Me, and The Word Alive on the Motel 6 Rock Yourself to Sleep Tour from January to February 2011.

On April 15, 2015, Samuel Penner announced he parted ways with the band for various reasons. In the mid-2015, Jim Hughes, guitarist of metal band Colossus and long time friend of the band joined as bassist, with Brandon taking over guitars for Penner. On July 30, 2015, the band announced that they had signed with Nuclear Blast, and their new album would be released through the label. On August 21, 2015, the band initiated pre-orders for their new album, Wake, which was released on October 2, 2015, and a new music video titled "Broken Lens".

On July 5, 2016, the band announced via Facebook they will embark on a farewell tour and will disband after the tour ends. Before disbanding, two members of the band, Ryan (lead guitar) and Brandon Leitru (bass guitarist), formed a new band called Nothing Left, with members of Silent Planet and A Bullet for Pretty Boy. The band played their last show on December 18, 2016 with Silent Planet, Oh, Sleeper, Norma Jean and Fit for a King.

On October 22, 2018, Montgomery announced that the band would be playing on October 28, for a tribute show that We Came as Romans organized for Kyle Pavone, making it clear that this would not be a reunion.

== Name ==
Montgomery stated the band selected the name while only one member was a Christian but that it "sounded cool" but have since transformed the meaning to be scriptural.

== Band members ==
Final line-up

- Ryan Leitru – lead guitar, clean vocals (2005–2016)
- Brandon Leitru – bass (2005–2015); rhythm guitar (2015–2016)
- Mattie Montgomery – lead vocals (2007–2016)
- David Puckett – drums (2012–2016)
- Jim Hughes – bass, backing vocals (2015–2016)

Live

- Ryan Kirby – vocals (2014, frontman of Fit for a King)
- Julio Garcia – drums (2013)

Former

- Jon Lauters – bass (2005)
- Brennan Schaeuble – bass (2005)
- Matt Tyler – lead vocals (2007)
- David Morrison – drums, vocals (2005–2012)
- Mike Reynolds – rhythm guitar (2005–2013)
- Sam Penner – rhythm guitar (2013–2015)

Timeline

== Discography ==
For Today discography
- Studio albums: 6
- Extended plays: 2
- Music videos: 12

=== Studio albums ===
List of studio albums, with selected chart positions
Title	Album details	Peak chart positions					
Title	Album details	US	US Heat.	US Indie.	US Rock	US Hard Rock	US Christ.
Ekklesia	Released: April 1, 2008; Label: Facedown; Formats: CD, digital download	—	—	—	—	—	—
Portraits	Released: June 9, 2009; Label: Facedown; Formats: CD, digital download	—	14	40	—	—	15
Breaker	Released: August 31, 2010; Label: Facedown; Formats: CD, digital download	54	—	8	20	8	3
Immortal	Released: May 29, 2012; Label: Razor & Tie; Formats: CD, digital download	15	—	3	7	1	1
Fight the Silence	Released: February 4, 2014; Label: Razor & Tie; Formats: CD, digital download	32	—	4	7	2	2
Wake	Released: October 2, 2015; Label: Nuclear Blast; Formats: CD, digital download	67	—	17	9	10	3
"—" denotes a recording that did not chart or was not released in that territory.

=== EPs ===
List of EPs, with selected chart positions
Title	Album details	Peak chart positions				
Title	Album details	US	US Indie.	US Rock	US Hard Rock	US Christ.
Your Moment, Your Life, Your Time	Released: 2006; Label: independent; Formats: CD	—	—	—	—	—
Prevailer	Released: April 2, 2013; Label: Razor & Tie; Formats: CD, digital download	47	12	14	2	2
"—" denotes a recording that did not chart or was not released in that territory.

=== Music videos ===
Title	From the album
"Agape"	Ekklesia
"Saul of Tarsus (The Messenger)"	Portraits
"Devastator"	Breaker
"Seraphim"	Breaker
"Fearless"	Immortal
"Foundation"	Immortal
"Flesh and Blood"	Prevailer
"Fight the Silence"	Fight the Silence
"Break the Cycle"	Fight the Silence
"Molotov"	Fight the Silence
"Broken Lens"	Wake
"Bitter Roots"	Wake
"No Truth, No Sacrifice"	Wake
