= List of Christian hardcore bands =

The following is a list of Christian hardcore bands, organized alphabetically.

Christian hardcore is a subgenre of hardcore punk primarily distinguished by its lyrical focus on Christian themes and values, although former Burden of a Day guitarist Bryan Honhart has suggested that the genre also possesses sonic distinctions. Bands such as The Crucified, Focused, Focal Point, Zao and No Innocent Victim are considered progenitors of the movement. In recent years, Demon Hunter and The Chariot have gained considerable popularity among fans of the genre, while metalcore bands such as Underoath, As I Lay Dying, and Norma Jean have served as mainstream representatives of the genre.

This list consists of Christian bands that play hardcore punk or any hardcore punk subgenres.

== 0–9 ==
- 38th Parallel
- 3rd Root
- '68
- 7 Angels 7 Plagues

== A ==
- Ace Augustine
- Advent
- Akissforjersey
- Alove for Enemies
- Altars
- Ambassadors of Shalom
- Anberlin
- And Then There Were None (early)
- Ark of the Covenant
- Artifex Pereo
- As Cities Burn
- As Hell Retreats
- As They Sleep
- The Ascendicate
- At the Throne of Judgment
- Attalus
- August Burns Red

== B ==
- Beartooth
- Becoming the Archetype
- Becoming Saints
- Before Their Eyes
- Behold the Kingdom
- Being as an Ocean
- Beloved
- Benea Reach
- Besieged
- The Blamed
- Blenderhead
- Blessed by a Broken Heart
- Blindside
- Bloodline Severed
- Bloodlined Calligraphy (Note: Self-Proclaimed as a Christian band)
- Bloodshed
- The Blue Letter
- Born Blind
- Brandtson
- A Bullet for Pretty Boy
- Burden of a Day
- Burn It Down

== C ==
- Call to Preserve
- Callisto
- The Chariot
- Chasing Victory
- Christ's Sake
- The Classic Crime
- Clear Convictions
- Close Your Eyes
- The Color Morale
- Colossus
- Comrades
- Confide
- Conveyer
- Convictions
- Corpus Christi
- Crashdog
- Creations
- Cries Hannah
- The Crimson Armada
- The Crucified
- Cry of the Afflicted

== D ==
- Darkness Divided
- Day of Vengeance
- Dead Poetic
- Dear Ephesus
- Debtor
- Demise of Eros
- Demon Hunter
- Dependency
- Destroy the Runner
- The Devil Wears Prada
- Disciple (early)
- Divide the Sea
- Dizmas (early)
- Dogwood
- Doomsday Hymn
- Dynasty

== E ==
- Earth Groans
- East West
- Edison Glass
- Embodiment 12:14
- Embodyment
- Emery
- Enlow
- Eso-Charis
- Everdown
- Every Day Life
- Every Knee Shall Bow
- Everything in Slow Motion
- Extol

== F ==
- Falling Cycle
- Fallstar
- Family Force 5
- The Famine
- Far-Less
- Fasedown
- Few Left Standing
- Figure Four
- Final Surrender
- Fireflight (early)
- Fit for a King
- Flactorophia
- Flee the Seen
- Flyleaf
- Focused
- For All Eternity
- For the Fallen Dreams
- For Today
- Foreknown
- Forever Changed
- ForeverAtLast
- Forevermore
- Forfeit Thee Untrue
- Further Seems Forever

== G ==
- The Gentleman Homicide
- Gideon
- Glass Casket
- The Great Commission
- Gwen Stacy

== H ==
- Hands
- The Handshake Murders
- Haste the Day
- He Is Legend
- Headnoise
- Hearts Like Lions
- Here I Come Falling
- A Hill to Die Upon (early)
- The Hoax
- Hope For The Dying
- Hopesfall
- Hundredth

== I ==
- I Am Alpha and Omega
- I Am Empire
- I Am Terrified
- I, the Breather
- Impending Doom
- In the Midst of Lions
- Inhale Exhale
- Inked In Blood
- Ironwill
- Islander
- Ivoryline

== J ==
- Jamie's Elsewhere
- Jawbone
- Jesus Wept
- Judgement X Day
- The Juliana Theory
- Justifide

== K ==
- Kids in the Way
- Kingston Falls

== L ==
- Lament
- Leaders
- Left Out
- Letter to the Exiles (Note: Self-described as a Christian band.)
- Life in Your Way (Note: Self-described as a Christian band.)
- Living Sacrifice
- Lucerin Blue
- Lust Control
- Luti-Kriss

== M ==
- Manafest
- Maranatha
- Maylene and the Sons of Disaster
- Means
- Memphis May Fire
- Metanoia
- Mindrage
- Misery Chastain
- Mortal Treason
- Mortification
- My Heart to Fear
- MyChildren MyBride

== N ==
- Nailed Promise
- New Waters
- Ninety Pound Wuss
- No Innocent Victim
- Nobody Special
- Nodes of Ranvier
- Norma Jean
- Nothing Til Blood

== O ==
- Officer Negative
- Oh, Sleeper
- The Old-Timers
- Once Nothing
- One Bad Pig
- The Ongoing Concept
- Onward to Olympas
- The Out Circuit
- Overcome
- The Overseer

== P ==
- P.O.D.
- A Past Unknown (Note: Self-described as a Christian band.)
- Phinehas
- Pillar (early)
- Platoon 1107
- A Plea for Purging
- Point of Recognition
- Poured Out
- Project 86

== R ==
- R.A.I.D.
- Raid
- Rapture
- The Red Baron
- The Red Jumpsuit Apparatus
- Remembrance
- Remove the Veil (Note: Described as a Christian band by Indie Vision Music.)
- Rival Choir
- Rod Laver

== S ==
- Saints Never Surrender
- Saving Grace
- Scarlet (Note: Described as a Christian band by Metal Sucks.)
- Scaterd Few
- See the Rise
- Seemless
- Selfmindead
- Sent by Ravens
- Serianna
- Seventh Star
- Sever Your Ties
- Showbread
- The Showdown
- Silent Planet
- Sinai Beach
- Since Remembered
- Six Feet Deep
- Sleeping by the Riverside
- Sleeping Giant
- Society's Finest
- Solus Deus
- Sovereign Strength
- Spirit and the Bride
- Spitfire
- Spoken
- Stand Your Ground
- Staple
- Stars Are Falling
- Stavesacre
- Still Breathing
- Still Remains
- Strengthen What Remains
- Stretch Arm Strong
- Strongarm
- Symphony in Peril

== T ==
- Take It Back!
- Tantrum of the Muse
- Ten 33
- Terminal
- Texas in July
- These Hearts
- Thin Ice
- This Beautiful Republic
- This Is Hell (Note: Identified as Christian by Audio Ink Radio.)
- This or the Apocalypse
- Those Who Fear
- Thousand Foot Krutch
- A Thousand Times Repent
- Thrice
- Through Solace
- Times of Grace
- To Speak of Wolves
- Training for Utopia
- Trenches (Note: Self-described as a Christian band.)
- Twelve Gauge Valentine

== U ==
- Unashamed
- Undercover
- Underoath (early)
- UnTeachers

== V ==
- Venia
- Vomitorial Corpulence

== W ==
- War of Ages
- Warlord
- We Came as Romans
- We the Gathered
- The Wedding
- What We Do in Secret
- With Blood Comes Cleansing
- With Increase
- Wolves at the Gate
- Wovenwar
- Wrench in the Works

== X ==
- xDEATHSTARx
- xDISCIPLEx A.D.
- xLooking Forwardx
- XXI

== Y ==
- Your Chance to Die
- Your Memorial
- Yours for Mine

== Z ==
- Zao

== See also ==
- Christian hardcore
- Christian punk
- List of Christian punk bands
- List of hardcore punk bands
- List of Christian metal artists
