= List of Christian metal artists =

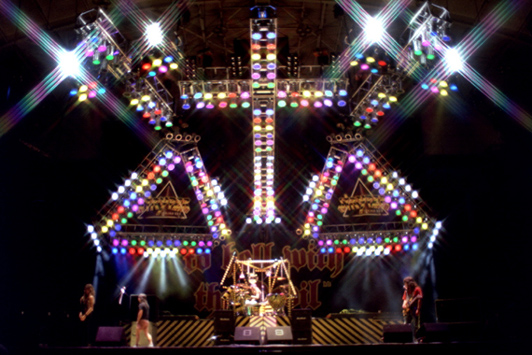
Stryper on tour in 1987 to support their third album, To Hell with the Devil, which reached platinum status at a time when most Christian bands were going unheard in the secular market.

Here is a list of Christian rock and metal artists. Not all artists on this list qualify as Christian metal at every phase of their careers.

Christian metal, also known as white metal or heavenly metal, is heavy metal music with a Christian message. Christian metal is regarded more of a concept rather than a genre, since it has no specific musical characteristics. Emerging in the late 1970s as a means of evangelization to the wider heavy metal music scene, it was pioneered by American bands like Resurrection Band, Saint, and Barnabas, Swedish bands Jerusalem, and Canadian band Daniel Band. Los Angeles' Stryper achieved wide success in the 1980s. In the mid to late 1980s, extreme metal genres were popularized by bands such as Vengeance Rising, Deliverance, Believer and Tourniquet. In the early 1990s, the Australian death metal band Mortification rose to prominence within its country's underground metal scene. At the turn of the 21st century, P.O.D. achieved a mainstream commercial success rivaling that of Stryper, with two multi-platinum albums. The metalcore groups Underoath, Demon Hunter, As I Lay Dying and Norma Jean also brought a relatively high level of mainstream attention to the movement in the first decade of the 2000s, and were dubbed "The Holy Alliance" in media coverage.

== 0-9 ==
- 2Tm2,3
- 3rd Root
- 7 Angels 7 Plagues
- 12 Stones
- 38th Parallel

== A ==
- Abated Mass of Flesh
- Ace Augustine
- Admonish
- Advent
- Aggelos
- The Agony Scene
- Aletheian
- Alisa
- Alove for Enemies
- Altars
- Altera Enigma
- Antestor
- Antidemon
- Argyle Park
- Ark of the Covenant
- Armageddon Holocaust
- As Cities Burn
- As Hell Retreats
- As I Lay Dying
- As They Sleep
- The Ascendicate
- Ascending King
- Ashen Mortality
- At the Throne of Judgment
- Atomic Opera
- Attack Attack!
- Audiovision
- August Burns Red

== B ==
- Balance of Power
- Barnabas
- Barren Cross
- The Beckoning
- Becoming Saints
- Becoming the Archetype
- Behold the Kingdom
- Being as an Ocean
- Believer
- Beloved
- Benea Reach
- Besieged
- Betraying the Martyrs
- Blessed by a Broken Heart
- Blessthefall
- Blindside
- Blood Covenant
- Blood of the Martyrs
- Bloodgood
- Bloodlined Calligraphy
- Bloodline Severed
- Cesare Bonizzi
- Bride
- Broken Flesh
- Brotality
- A Bullet for Pretty Boy
- Burden of a Day
- The Burial
- Burn It Down

== C ==
- Cage
- Called to Arms
- Call to Preserve
- Callisto
- The Chariot
- Chasing Victory
- Chatterbox
- Children of Wrath
- Christageddon
- Church Tongue
- Circle of Dust
- Clear Convictions
- Close Your Eyes
- The Color Morale
- Colossus
- Conditions
- Confessions of a Traitor
- Confide
- Conveyer (Note: Self-described as a Christian band.)
- Convictions
- Corpus Christi
- Creations
- Cries Hannah
- Crimson Moonlight
- Crimson Thorn
- The Crucified
- Cruentis
- Cry of the Afflicted

== D ==
- Daniel Band
- Darkness Divided
- Darkwater
- Day of Vengeance
- Death Requisite
- Death Therapy
- Debtor
- Deliverance
- Demise of Eros
- Demon Hunter
- Demoniciduth
- Destroy the Runner
- Detritus
- Deus Invictus
- Deuteronomium
- The Devil Wears Prada
- Die Happy
- DigHayZoose
- Dire
- Disciple
- Divide the Sea
- Divinefire
- Dizmas
- Doomsday Hymn
- Drottnar

== E ==
- Earth Groans
- East West
- Echo Hollow
- Elgibbor
- Embodiment 12:14
- Embodyment
- Emery
- Eso-Charis
- Everdown
- Every Day Life
- Every Knee Shall Bow
- Everyone Dies in Utah
- Everything in Slow Motion
- Extol

== F ==
- Falling Cycle
- Falling Up
- Fallstar
- Family Force 5
- The Famine
- Fasedown
- Feast Eternal
- Few Left Standing
- Figure Four
- Final Surrender
- Fit for a King
- Flactorophia
- Flawed by Design
- Fleshkiller
- Flyleaf
- Focused
- For All Eternity
- For Today
- For the Fallen Dreams
- Foreknown
- Forevermore
- Forfeit Thee Untrue
- From Autumn to Ashes
- From the Shallows
- Frosthardr
- Frost Like Ashes

== G ==
- Galactic Cowboys
- The Gates of Slumber
- The Gentleman Homicide
- Gideon
- Glass Casket
- Gnashing of Teeth
- Golden Resurrection
- Grave Declaration
- Grave Forsaken
- The Great Commission
- Gretchen
- Guardian
- Gwen Stacy

== H ==
- Hand of Fire
- Hands
- The Handshake Murders
- Harmony
- Haste the Day
- HB
- He Is Legend
- Heaven's Force
- Here I Come Falling
- A Hill to Die Upon
- Holy Blood
- Holy Soldier
- Hope for the Dying
- Hopesfall
- Horde
- Hortor
- Hundredth

== I ==
- I, the Breather
- I Am Terrified
- Immortal Souls
- Impellitteri
- Impending Doom
- Indwelling
- Inevitable End
- Inhale Exhale
- Inked in Blood
- In the Midst of Lions
- Islander

== J ==
- Jacobs Dream
- Jamie's Elsewhere
- Jerusalem
- Jesus Wept
- Jonah33
- Joshua
- Justifide

== K ==
- Kekal
- King James
- Kingston Falls
- Kohllapse
- Kryst the Conqueror
- Kutless

== L ==
- Lament
- Leaders
- Lengsel
- The Letter Black
- Letter to the Exiles
- Leviticus
- Life in Your Way
- Light Unseen
- Living Sacrifice
- Love and Death
- Lucerin Blue
- Lust Control
- LVL

== M ==
- Mad Max
- Magdallan
- Manafest
- Mantric
- Maranatha
- Mastedon
- Mayfly
- Maylene and the Sons of Disaster
- Means
- Mehida
- Memento
- Memphis May Fire
- Messiah Prophet
- Messengers
- Metanoia
- Mindrage
- Miseration
- Misery Chastain
- Monotheist
- Mortal
- Mortal Treason
- Mortification
- My Heart to Fear
- My Ransomed Soul
- MyChildren MyBride

== N ==
- Nailed Promise
- Narcissus
- Narnia
- Necromance
- Neon Cross
- Nine Lashes
- No Innocent Victim
- Nodes of Ranvier
- Norma Jean
- Nothing Left
- Nothing Til Blood

== O ==
- O, Majestic Winter
- Officer Negative
- Oficina G3
- Oh, Sleeper
- Oil
- Once Dead
- Once Nothing
- One Bad Pig
- Onward to Olympas
- The Ongoing Concept
- Opprobrium
- Outrage A.D.
- Overcome
- The Overseer

== P ==
- Pantokrator
- Paradox
- Paramaecium
- A Past Unknown
- PAX217
- Peace of Mind
- Petra
- Philadelphia
- Phinehas
- Pillar
- Place of Skulls
- A Plea for Purging
- P.O.D.
- Point of Recognition
- Poured Out
- Precious Death
- Project 86
- Promise Land
- Pyramaze

== R ==
- R.A.I.D.
- Raid
- Random Hero
- Recon
- Red
- Reform the Resistance
- ReinXeed
- Remembrance
- Remove the Veil
- Renascent
- Resurrection Band
- Revulsed
- Rival Choir
- Rob Rock
- Rod Laver
- Randy Rose

== S ==
- Sacrament
- Sacred Warrior
- The Sacrificed
- Sacrificium
- Saint
- Sanctifica
- Saving Grace
- Saviour Machine
- Scarlet
- Schaliach
- Scourged Flesh
- Seasons in the Field
- See the Rise
- Seemless
- Selfmindead
- Separatist
- Serianna
- Settle the Sky
- Seventh Angel
- Seventh Avenue
- Seventh Day Slumber
- Seventh Star
- Sever Your Ties
- Shadows of Paragon
- Shai Hulud
- Shout
- Showbread
- The Showdown
- Signum Regis
- Silent Planet
- Sinai Beach
- Sinbreed
- Since October
- SinDizzy
- Six Feet Deep
- Skald in Veum
- Skillet
- Slechtvalk
- Sleeping by the Riverside
- Sleeping Giant
- Society's Finest
- Solamors
- Solus Deus
- Soul Embraced
- Sovereign Strength
- Spirit and the Bride
- Spitfire
- Spoken
- Stars Are Falling
- Stavesacre
- Still Breathing
- Still Remains
- Strengthen What Remains
- Stretch Arm Strong
- Strongarm
- Stryken
- Stryper
- Sympathy
- Symphony in Peril

== T ==
- Taking the Head of Goliath
- Tantrum of the Muse
- Temple of Blood
- Temple of Perdition
- Texas In July
- Theocracy
- Thieves & Liars
- This Is Hell
- This or the Apocalypse
- Those Who Fear
- Thousand Foot Krutch
- A Thousand Times Repent
- Through Solace
- To Speak of Wolves
- Tortured Conscience
- Tourniquet
- Training for Utopia
- Travail
- Trenches
- Trouble
- Trytan
- The Tug Fork River Band
- Twelve Gauge Valentine

== U ==
- Ultimatum
- Unashamed
- Undercover
- Underneath the Gun
- Underoath (Early, until 2018)
- Undish
- UnTeachers

== V ==
- V8
- Vaakevandring
- Vardøger
- Vengeance Rising
- Venia
- Veni Domine
- Vials of Wrath
- Virgin Black
- Vomitorial Corpulence

== W ==
- War of Ages
- Warlord
- We as Human
- We the Gathered
- Brian Welch
- What We Do in Secret
- Whitecross
- With Blood Comes Cleansing
- Woe of Tyrants
- Wolves at the Gate
- Worldview
- Wovenwar
- Wrench in the Works
- Wytch Hazel

== X ==
- X-Sinner
- xDeathstarx
- xDisciplex A.D.
- XIII Minutes
- XT
- XXI

== Y ==
- Your Chance to Die
- Your Memorial

== Z ==
- Zao

== See also ==
- Christian metal
- Unblack metal
- List of Christian hardcore bands
- List of Christian punk bands
- List of Christian rock bands
- List of heavy metal bands
