= Blood and Ink Records =

American independent record label

Blood & Ink Records
- Founded: 2002
- Founder: David Villalpando, Jamie Nester
- Distributor(s): INgrooves, Universal
- Genre: Christian punk Christian hardcore, Christian metal
- Country of origin: United States
- Location: Richmond, Virginia
- Official website: bloodandinkrecords.com

Blood & Ink Records is an American independent record label that specializes in Christian punk and Christian hardcore music. The label was founded in Richmond, Virginia, in the spring of 2002. The label has worked with such bands as Soul Embraced, as well as helping launch careers for Blessed by a Broken Heart, Burden of a Day and With Blood Comes Cleansing.

In July 2010, they re-released Strongarm's 1995 album, Atonement, the first time on vinyl.

== Roster ==
- Debtor
- Dwell
- Infinite Me
- Jawbone
- New Heart
- Problem of Pain
- The Satire
- Slow Bullet
- Strengthen What Remains
- Thirtyseven
- Tigerwine
- The Virgin Birth
- Withered Bones
- With Increase

=== Affiliated ===
- Clear Convictions (formerly with Facedown Records and OnTheAttack Records).
- Figure Four (with Facedown Records and Solid State Records).
- No Innocent Victim (with Rescue Records, Facedown Records, Solid State Records, and Victory Records).
- Strongarm (with Solid State Records and Tooth & Nail Records).

=== Former ===
- All In
- The Attending
- Besieged
- Better Off
- Blessed by a Broken Heart
- The Blue Letter
- Burden of a Day
- Comrades
- The Culprits
- Church Tongue
- Dependency
- Divide the Sea
- Enlow
- Foreknown
- The Gentleman Homicide
- Household
- Ironwill
- Joy
- xLooking Forwardx
- Medford Drive
- Neshama
- New Waters
- Nourishtheflame
- Rapture of the Meek
- The Recession
- The Red Baron
- Saints Never Surrender
- Send Out Scuds
- Since Remembered
- Skylines
- Soul Embraced
- Stars Are Falling
- Ten 33
- Thin Ice
- TruthBeKnown
- Vagabonds
- Venia
- With Blood Comes Cleansing
- With Increase
- Yours for Mine
