= With Shaking Hands =

American Christian metal band

- Origin: Fort Worth, Texas
- Genres: Christian hardcore, Christian metal, electronicore, screamo
- Years active: 2009–present
- Label: PHM
- Members: Tyler Dixon; Matt Gulick; Russell Mertz; Brody Pempsell; Aaron Gavaldon
- Website: facebook.com/withshakinghands

With Shaking Hands is an American Christian hardcore and Christian metal band, and they primarily play electronicore and screamo. They are from Fort Worth, Texas. The band started making music in 2010. The band released, an extended play, Armor of Light, in 2012, with PHM Records.

== Background ==
With Shaking Hands is a Christian hardcore and Christian metal band from Fort Worth, Texas. Their members are lead vocalist, Tyler Dixon, background vocalist and guitarist, Matt Gulick, guitarist, Russell Mertz, bassist, Brody Pempsell, and drummer, Aaron Gavaldon.

== Music history ==
The band commenced as a musical entity in 2010, with their first release, Armor of Light, an extended play, that was released on June 10, 2012, with PHM Records.

== Members ==
Current members

- Tyler Dixon - vocals
- Matt Gulick - guitar, backing vocals
- Russell Mertz - guitar
- Brody Pempsell - bass
- Aaron Gavaldon - drums

== Discography ==
EPs

- Armor of Light (June 10, 2012, PHM)
