= Fight to be Free =

Fight to be Free may refer to:

- "Fight to be Free", song by Nuclear Assault 1988
- Fight to be Free, EP by The Hoax (band) 2009
- "Fight to Be Free", Shadow Warriors cover on Maximum Overload (DragonForce album)
