= Modern Gentlemen =

Modern Gentlemen may refer to:

- "Modern Gentlemen" (song), a 2009 by Burden of a Day
- The Modern Gentlemen, a quartet that originated as the 2003–2018 lineup of The Four Seasons (band)
