= Enlow =

Enlow may refer to:

- Enlow, Pennsylvania
- Enlow (band)
- Blayne Enlow, born 1999
