= O, Majestic Winter =

Unblack/Christian metal band

- Origin: Lewisburg, Tennessee, U.S.
- Genres: Christian metal; black metal; unblack metal; experimental metal; experimental black metal
- Years active: 2008–present
- Labels: Sullen; Sanctus Gladius
- Members: Max Tubville; Corey Leverette
- Website: O, Majestic Winter on Facebook

O, Majestic Winter, also stylized as O' Majestic Winter, is an experimental black metal project formed in Lewisburg, Tennessee, United States in 2008. Max Tubville and Corey Leverette started the project. Both had performed in hardcore punk band Seventimesfallen prior to forming the band. The band has released four studio albums, two through Sullen Records, and the third through Sanctus Gladius Records.

== History ==
Max Tubville and Corey Leverette formed O, Majestic Winter in October 2008. They had worked together in Seventimesfallen, a Christian hardcore band they had formed during high school. The two went under the aliases "Morgemil the Dark Slayer" and "Gorlim the Dead", but shortened them to "Morgemil" and "Gorlim".

On November 10, 2008, the band announced they had signed to Sullen Records, home to Elgibbor, Frost Like Ashes, Hortor, and Broken Flesh. On March 12, 2009, the band released their debut album, Defiling the Serpent's Temple, through Sullen Records. The album was described to mix black metal, noise music, grindcore, and hardcore punk. Later that year, on September 17, 2009, the band released their second album, An Autumn Moon, through the same label. After the two albums, they departed the label and signed with Sanctus Gladius Records, home to Forfeit Thee Untrue, Diamoth, and Agonal. The band's third album, Eternal Shores: A Spiritual Odyssey, was set for release in 2013, but unknown circumstances prevented this. Sanctus Gladius released the album on April 9, 2015. In 2017, the band featured on the compilation Hymns of the Blackest Light, Volume 1, including bands such as Vials of Wrath, Orationem, Corpse, and Timōrātus. On January 7, 2019, the band stated fans needed to "stay tuned in 2019", hinting at potential new music.

== Members ==
- Max "Morgemil the Dark Slayer" Tubville – vocals, guitars, bass, keyboards (2008–present) (formerly of Abated Mass of Flesh)
- Corey "Gorlim the Dead" Leverette – vocals, guitars, keyboards, drums (2008–present)

== Discography ==
Studio albums

- Defiling the Serpent's Temple (March 12, 2009; Sullen Records)
- An Autumn Moon (September 17, 2009; Sullen Records)
- Eternal Shores: A Spiritual Odyssey (April 9, 2015; Sanctus Gladius Records)
- Gloaming (April 7, 2021; independent)
