= Grace Street =

Grace Street may refer to:

== Places ==
- Grace Street Commercial Historic District, national historic district located in Richmond, Virginia
- Grace Street, Alta Vista Terrace District, Chicago
- Grace Street, Italian Walk of Fame, Toronto
- Grace Street, Jack & Newell General Store, Herberton, Queensland, Australia.
- Grace Street, Cedar Hill (New Haven)
- Grace Street line to Delaware Street, 1895 Syracuse Consolidated Street Railway

== Entertainment ==
- Grace Street (Big Wreck album), Canadian album
- "Grace Street", song by Tom Rapp from Familiar Songs 1972

== See also ==
- Nightmare on Grace Street, a 2005 album by Ten 33
- "Nightmare on Grace Street", a 2011 episode of The Cleveland Show
