= Jawbone (disambiguation) =

Jawbone may refer to:

- Mandible, the lower jaw bone
- Maxilla, the upper jaw bone
- Jawbone (instrument), a musical instrument made from the jawbone of a donkey, horse, or zebra
- Jawbone (musician), blues musician Bob Zabor
- Jawbone (band), an American hardcore punk band
- Jawbone (company), makers of Bluetooth headsets and activity trackers
- Jawbone (film), a 2017 British film
- Jaw Bone, a member of the Fossil Lords from the GoBots franchise
- a sport sunglasses by Oakley, Inc., popularly used by professional race cyclists
- a song by the Band, on their 1969 album The Band
- a term in macroeconomics: jawboning
- in rural British Columbia, and the southern Yukon, Canada, an expression equivalent to credit: "He gave me jawbone" means credit was advanced, usually by a merchant such as the Hudson's Bay Company
