= Flawed Design (disambiguation) =

"Flawed Design" is a 2006 song by Canadian indie rock band Stabilo.

Flawed Design may also refer to:

- Flawed Design (album), a 2019 album by Saint Asonia

== See also ==
- Flawed by Design, an American metalcore band
- Design Flaw a 1998 album by Art Bergmann
- Poor design, an argument against the assumption of the existence of a creator God
- Product defect, design flaws in commerce
