= Spirit and the Bride =

American Christian hardcore/metalcore band

- Origin: Cincinnati, Ohio
- Genres: Christian hardcore, Christian metalcore, Melodic hardcore
- Years active: 2010-present
- Labels: OnTheAttack! Records
- Members: Josh Simmons; Adam Simmons; Jeremiah Medley
- Past members: Devin Scarth; Preston Tucker; Josh Summerville
- Website: Spirit and the Bride on Facebook

Spirit and the Bride is a Christian hardcore and metalcore band from Cincinnati, Ohio. The band formed in 2010.

== History ==
Spirit and the Bride formed in 2010, with the lineup of vocalist Josh Simmons, drummer Adam Simmons, and guitarist Josh Summerville. The band performed their first show as a trio, before adding Devin Scarth to the lineup in 2011. Scarth departed from the band, being replaced Preston Tucker. In 2013, Tucker left the band, his position was filled by Jeremiah Medley. In 2014, the band released With Eyes and Ears to See and Hear independently. In 2015, the band signed with OnTheAttack Records, a Christian hardcore label from San Francisco, California. OnTheAttack would re-release the album through the label. The band would perform shows all throughout 2016, until they announced the release of Dry Bones. Dry Bones was released on May 30, 2017, marking the band's debut on the label. The band would go on to play Audiofeed 2017. On February 23, 2019, the band announced they would be disbanding that year, after a final show.

== Influences and style ==
Spirit and the Bride members have stated in previous interviews that they have been influenced heavily by bands such as Advent, Norma Jean (O God, the Aftermath era), Thrice, Venia, Sleeping Giant, Comeback Kid, The Red Baron, and The Chariot. However, reviewers have described the band as having an older Christian hardcore and old-school hardcore style, sounding like bands such as Focused, Zao, Strongarm, Shai Hulud, Brother's Keeper and even post-hardcore bands such as The Blamed.

== Members ==
Final lineup:

- Josh Simmons - vocals (2010–2019)
- Jeremiah Medley - bass (2013–2019)
- Adam Simmons - drums (2010–2019)

Former members:

- Josh Summerville - guitars (2010-2018)
- Devin Scarth - bass (2011)
- Preston Tucker - bass (2011-2013)

== Discography ==
Studio albums

- With Eyes and Ears to See and Hear (2016)
- Dry Bones (2017)

Singles

- "Name Above All Names" (2016)

Compilation appearances

- The Bearded Dragon's Sampler: Third Times a Charm (2017; The Bearded Dragon Productions)
- Metal From The Dragon (Vol. 1) (2017; The Bearded Dragon Productions)
