= Still Breathing =

Still Breathing may refer to:

- Still Breathing (band), an American Christian metal band from Oklahoma City, Oklahoma, USA
- Still Breathing (film), a 1997 drama feature film starring Brendan Fraser and Joanna Going
- "Still Breathing" (Green Day song), a 2016 song by American rock band Green Day
- "Still Breathing" (Mayday Parade song), a 2009 song by American rock band Mayday Parade
- "Still Breathing" (Samanta Tīna song), a 2020 song by Latvian singer Samanta Tīna
