= Better Off =

American rock band

- Also known as: Friends (2011–13)
- Origin: Nashville, Tennessee
- Genres: Alternative rock; indie rock; emo; pop punk
- Years active: 2011–2016, 2018–present
- Labels: Blood & Ink, 6131, Equal Vision
- Members: Luke Granered; Charles Miller
- Past members: Jon Dalman; Hunter Walls
- Website: bttroff.com

Better Off is an American rock band from Nashville, Tennessee, formed in 2011 under the name Friends. They changed their name in early 2013 to Better Off due to another group sharing the Friends name. They have released two albums, (I Think) I'm Leaving (2013) and Milk (2015), the latter of which charted on the Heatseekers Albums and Independent Albums charts. In March 2016, while on tour with Mayday Parade and The Maine, it was announced that the group would be dropping off tour and "going silent for a while" following sexual assault and abuse allegations against the bands former touring bassist, David Hobbs. During the bands hiatus and dissolvement of all relations with the former member, Better Off apologized to those involved with the situation and continued to quietly create and release their single "Bad Habit" on April 25, 2018.

== History ==
=== Friends and (I Think) I'm Leaving (2011–2014) ===
Better Off began as Friends, before changing its name due to another band called Friends. While under the Friends moniker, the band's music was similar to that of Thirtyseven. They released the EP Better Off Alone on June 9, 2011 through Blood and Ink. On February 10, 2013, the band changed their name to Better Off.

On June 11, 2013, it was announced the band had signed to 6131. On the same day, "The Price Is Never Right" was made available for streaming. On August 14, "A Fool Walks into a Bar and Cries Wolf" was made available for streaming. On August 28, "Keeping Watch" was made available for streaming. (I Think) I'm Leaving was made available for streaming on September 15, and was released through 6131 and Blood and Ink on September 24. On October 24, a music video was released for "A Fool Walks into a Bar and Cries Wolf", directed by Andy Reale. The video features the band playing inside a house, while people outside are cliff-jumping. The band supported Rust Belt Lights and Carousel Kings in December.

The band went on tour, supporting Major League in February and March 2014. On October 2, it was announced the band had signed to Equal Vision. Vocalist/guitarist Luke Granered exclaimed that it was "excit[ing] to be teaming up with Equal Vision". On October 15, "Meth Head" was made available for streaming. This song was a part of a 7" vinyl, titled Meth Head, with "I Was Better 10 Years Ago" as the B-side. "I Was Better 10 Years Ago" was made available for streaming on October 23. Meth Head was released through Equal Vision on October 27. The band supported New Found Glory on the Glamour Kills Tour in October and November. On November 5, a music video was released for "Meth Head".

=== Milk and hiatus (2015–2018) ===
On July 31, 2015, the band's second album, Milk, was announced for release and "Whatever I Don't Care" was made available for streaming. In early August, the band toured with Basement, Whirr, and LVL UP. On August 13, "Dresser Drawer" was made available for streaming. On August 28, "This Day Will Never End" was made available for streaming. In late August and September, the band toured with Bayside and The Early November. Milk was released through Equal Vision on September 11. The album was produced by Saves the Day's Arun Bali. Granered described the album as "a landmark of maturation and solidarity" for the group. He also said the group wished to create "something class-sounding [...] with big fuzzy guitars and interesting dynamics" within the songs. It charted at number 11 on the Heatseekers Albums chart, and at number 46 on the Independent Albums chart.

In October and November 2015, the band supported Pentimento. On December 11, a music video was released for "Dresser Drawer". In March and April 2016, the band was set to support Mayday Parade and The Maine on their tour of the U.S. On March 11, it was announced they would be dropping off tour and "going silent for a while" following sexual assault allegations towards their touring bassist David Hobbs.

=== Return and Reap What You Sow (2018–2021) ===
In 2018, the band released their first new music since 2015 in the singles "Bad Habit" and "Head Down". The band would later release their third full-length record Reap What You Sow on March 9, 2019, rekindling the band and setting a new course for their legacy.

In 2020, the band released the acoustic EP Redone, including reworked versions of hits such as "Meth Head" and "The Price is Never Right".

=== Self-Titled (since 2021) ===
On August 6, 2021, the band released the single "No Drama", followed by "Unreal" on August 27. The band announced their self-titled full-length record to be released on September 24, the day before their performance at Furnace Fest on September 25.

== Style and influences ==
Better Off have been described as alternative rock and indie rock, influenced by Weezer, Foo Fighters, and Jimmy Eat World. They have been compared to bands such as Daisyhead and Balance and Composure. (I Think) I'm Leaving has been described as alternative rock, emo, pop punk, pop rock, and power pop. Milk has been described as emo, grunge, pop punk, post-hardcore and rock. Brian Leak of Alternative Press called the album a mixture of Citizen's Youth (2013) and Brand New's Your Favorite Weapon (2001). Mike Damante of Chron compared the album to Jimmy Eat World's Futures (2004) and Invented (2010) albums. Damante noted that album "could've been a genre-defining record, if it came out 10 years ago."

== Accolades ==
(I Think) I'm Leaving was included on Rock Sound's "50 Best Albums of 2013" list at number 44. Milk was ranked at number 17 on AbsolutePunk's top albums of 2015 list.

== Band members ==
Current members

- Luke Granered – vocals, guitar (2011–present)
- Charles Miller – drums (2011–present)

Former members

- Jon Dalman – bass (2011–2016)
- Hunter Walls – guitar (2011–2016)

== Discography ==
Studio albums

Title	Album details
(I Think) I'm Leaving	Released: September 24, 2013; Label: 6131/Blood & Ink (6131060); Format: CD, DL, LP
Milk	Released: September 11, 2015; Label: Equal Vision (2853); Format: CD, DL, LP
Reap What You Sow	Released: March 4, 2019; Label: No Sleep Records; Format: LP, DL
Better Off	Released: September 24, 2021; Label: Parting Gift Records; Format: LP, DL

Extended plays

Title	Album details
Better Off Alone (Note: Released under the name Friends.)	Released: June 9, 2011; Label: Blood and Ink; Format: CS, DL
Redone	Released: September 18, 2020; Label: Self-released; Format: DL

Singles

List of singles, showing year released and album name
Title	Year	Album
"Meth Head"	2014	Non-album single
"Whatever, I Don't Care"	2015	Milk
"Dresser Drawer"	2015	Milk
"This Day Will Never End"	2015	Milk
"Bad Habit"	2018-2019	Reap What You Sow
"Head Down"	2018-2019	Reap What You Sow
"No Drama"	2021	Self-Titled
"Unreal"	2021	Self-Titled

Music videos

List of music videos, showing year released and director
Title	Year	Director
"A Fool Walks into a Bar and Cries Wolf"	2013	Andy Reale
"Meth Head"	2014	
"Dresser Drawer"	2015	
"Bad Habit"	2018	
"No Drama"	2021	Matthew DeLisi
