= Ironwill =

American Christian hardcore band

- Origin: Augusta, Georgia
- Genres: Christian hardcore, hardcore punk, melodic hardcore
- Years active: 2009–present
- Labels: Blood and Ink
- Members: Joseph Nordan-Vocals; Mykal Vincent - Guitar; Pat Fischer - Bass; Stephen Levy - Drums
- Past members: Matt Poppell - Guitar; Scott Hamby - Guitar; Aaron Bafford - Drums; Scott Caneda - Vocals
- Website: facebook.com/ironwillhardcore

Ironwill is an American Christian hardcore band, and they primarily play hardcore punk and melodic hardcore. They come from Augusta, Georgia. The band started making music, in 2009. Their first extended play, Unturned, was released in 2011 by Blood and Ink Records.

== Background ==
Ironwill is a Christian hardcore band from Augusta, Georgia.

== Music history ==
The band commenced as a musical entity in 2009, with their release, Unturned, an extended play, that was released by Blood and Ink Records, on March 29, 2011.

== Discography ==
EPs

- Unturned (March 29, 2011, Blood & Ink)
- Hour of the Wolf Demo (2009)
