= Since Remembered =

American band

- Origin: North Carolina
- Genres: Christian hardcore, hardcore punk
- Years active: 2004–2006
- Labels: Blood and Ink
- Past members: Danny Siviter; Brian Young; Chris Jacques; Mike Underwood; Kyle Woodall

Since Remembered was an American Christian hardcore band, where they primarily played a hardcore punk style of music. They come from North Carolina, where they started making music in 2004 and disbanded in 2006. The band released, a studio album, Coming Alive, in 2006, with Blood and Ink Records.

== Background ==
Since Remembered was a Christian hardcore band from North Carolina, where they were an entity from 2004 to 2006. Their members were vocalist, Danny Siviter, guitarist and vocalist, Brian Young, guitarist, Chris Jacques, bassist, Mike Underwood, and drummer, Kyle Woodall.

== Music history ==
The band commenced as a musical entity in 2004, with their first and only release, Coming Alive, a studio album, where it released on June 20, 2006, from Blood and Ink Records. Anchors, awarding the album three and a half stars from Punknews.org, states, "this remains a solid, solid hardcore record, and a landmark of sorts, in that it's the first release I've heard from Blood & Ink records that didn't end up with a cozy home in my garbage can." Reviewing the album for Indie Vision Music, Josh Murphy writes, "This is an album for fans of this genre but I don’t see it branching beyond that."

== Members ==
Current members

- Danny Siviter – vocals
- Brian Young – guitar, vocals
- Chris Jacques – guitar
- Mike Underwood – bass
- Kyle Woodall – drums

== Discography ==
Studio albums

- Coming Alive (June 20, 2006, Blood and Ink)
