= With Increase =

American Christian hardcore band

- Origin: Tampa, Florida
- Genres: Christian hardcore, hardcore punk, melodic hardcore
- Years active: 2008–2015
- Labels: Blood and Ink
- Past members: Will; Doug; Justin; Travis; Paul
- Website: facebook.com/withincreasefl/

With Increase was an American Christian hardcore band, where they primarily played hardcore punk and melodic hardcore. They come from Tampa, Florida. The band started making music in 2008 and disbanded in 2015. The band released a studio album, Death Is Inevitable, in 2014, with Blood and Ink Records.

== Background ==
With Increase was a Christian hardcore band from Tampa, Florida. Their members were Will, Doug, Justin, Paul and Travis.

== Music history ==
The band commenced as a musical entity in 2008. They released the EP, "This Is Not Your Home" in 2010. After a change of vocalists, they released, "Signs of The Time" through Blood and Ink Records. Their final record, and first full length LP was, Death Is Inevitable, a studio album, that was released on February 25, 2014, from Blood and Ink Records.

== Members ==
Last known line-up

- Will
- Doug
- Justin
- Travis
- Paul

== Discography ==
Studio albums

- Death Is Inevitable (February 25, 2014, Blood and Ink)
