= OneOneThousand =

Oneonethousand

Studio album by Burden of a Day
- Released: May 12, 2009
- Genre: Post-hardcore
- Length: 32:35
- Label: Rise
- Producer: Andrew Wade

Burden of a Day chronology
Blessed Be Our Ever After (2008)	Oneonethousand (2009)

Professional ratings
Review scores
Source	Rating
AllMusic	2.5/5 stars
Jesus Freak Hideout	3.5/5 stars
The Interlude	5/5 stars

Oneonethousand is the third full-length studio album by American post-hardcore band Burden of a Day. The album was released on May 12, 2009. It is their second album with Rise Records, and the first with lead singer Kyle Tamosaitis.
The album debuted at #21 on the Billboard Top Heatseekers chart and #25 on the Billboard Top Christian Albums chart.

== Track listing ==
No.	Title	Length
1.	"Remember (featuring Kendall Knepp)"	3:39
2.	"Fool Me Once"	3:43
3.	"The Mason"	3:31
4.	"Oceans"	1:24
5.	"The Shame in Shedding Wool"	3:35
6.	"Sly Foxes"	3:52
7.	"Isadora Duncan"	3:48
8.	"Oneonethousand"	3:28
9.	"Modern Gentlemen"	3:34
10.	"My Forfeit"	4:00
Total length:		32:35
