= Household (band) =

American band

- Origin: Minneapolis, Minnesota, United States
- Genres: Punk; indie; emo
- Years active: 2013–present
- Labels: Equal Vision; Blood and Ink
- Members: Joshua Gilbert; Matthew Anthony; Nathanael Olson
- Past members: Abigail Olson; Josh Czech
- Website: householdband.com

Household is an American melodic punk and "indie-coated emo" band from Minneapolis, Minnesota, formed in August 2013. The band's members are Joshua Gilbert (vocals, bass), Matthew Anthony (drums), and Nathanael Olson (guitar). They have released four albums.

== History ==
Household signed with Blood & Ink Records on June 5, 2014. Their first EP, With or Without, was released on September 30, 2014. New Noise Magazine characterized Household and their sound at the time of With or Without as "unapologetic and bursting with energy." Indie Vision described the release as "a mash-up of melodic hardcore, chaos, and post-hardcore" that finds its place "in the large revival of 90s style raw hardcore/metalcore, a artistic look back at a time when passion and honesty played a foundational role in a band's identity."

In March 2015 they began recording with producer and Defeater guitarist Jay Maas. The singles "Wistern", released July 20, 2015, "Undertow" released August 11, 2015", and "Try Hard" released September 2, 2015, were the first tastes of Household's new sound on Time Spent. At the premiere of "Undertow", Alt Press wrote that the single and the Time Spent formula is "one of unpredictability that blends several genres and styles with a cohesive sleekness," saying that "[r]aw hardcore elements meet emo and pop-punk with a little bit of math rock thrown in for good measure."

Household released their debut album, Time Spent, on September 25, 2015, via Blood & Ink Records. The album was received well by critics and earned many positive reviews. PureVolume called Household "one of the best new bands to come from the Twin Cities" on the day of Time Spent's release, saying their "bonecrushing guitar riffs and pulsating drumming offer a terrific blend of hardcore and melodic punk." Alt Press cited Household as one of 16 bands to watch in 2016. Substream Magazine calls Time Spent a "huge leap forward for the band, with heartfelt lyrics atop winding melodies and clever arrangements." Circuit Sweet said the sound of Time Spent demonstrates Household's "impressive growth as a band."

=== Split EP with Infinite Me (May 5, 2017) ===
On March 14, 2017, Household premiered "Distant Truth (Part 1)", a track from the forthcoming split with then Blood & Ink labelmates Infinite Me. The EP was released on May 5.

Some reviewers commented on Household's continual changing of sound, this time heading in the direction of emo. New Noise Magazine praised Household's side of the split, describing their three songs as "driving and punchy, saying that "their throwback emo/post-hardcore is as emotionally heavy as it musically engaging," commending the raw vocals. Mind Equals Blown commented that, though Household anchored their "beginnings in punk, ... they've since hinged more on melody," saying that "[w]hile elements of hardcore and punk both remain in their new identity, they now also share elements with a range of Tooth & Nail Record artists" like August Burns Red and Emery, and incorporate "combinations of indie rock, post-hardcore, emo, and punk."

In December 2017, Household signed with Equal Vision Records. On January 15, 2018, Household released a new single, "Don't Listen to Me" with an accompanying video from their new album, Everything A River Should Be.

Household's second album, Everything A River Should Be, was released on February 23, 2018, via Equal Vision. The album was recorded with Nate Washburn at Glow in the Dark studios.

Alt Press defines Household's style on the album as an "earnest, sprawling take on punk-influenced emo sounds." Several review outlets pointed out that Everything A River Should Be marks another change in sound. Hifi Noise wrote that the new album marked a big change for Household as they head into "blending rock and emo for a new sound" that sounds "way more polished" than ever, a feature that suits the band.

After recording the record, Household underwent a change in lineup as guitarist Abigail Olson and bassist Josh Czech left the band, with Gilbert moving to vocalist and bassist.

In April 2020, the band released the standalone single Spun with an accompanying music video. Spun was included on a 7" split with the song Blur by fellow Minneapolis band Author. In 2021, the band released a Bandcamp-exclusive compilation album entitled whatamisaying, whatamidoing? On October 6, 2022, Household independently released their fourth full-length album, Hibernate.

== Discography ==
Studio releases

- With or Without (EP, September 30, 2014)
- Time Spent (LP, September 25, 2015)
- Split with Infinite Me (EP, May 5, 2017)
- Everything A River Should Be (LP, February 23, 2018)
- Hibernate (LP, October 6, 2022)
