= Rapture (hardcore band) =

AmericanChristian hardcore punk band

- Origin: San Francisco, California
- Genres: Christian hardcore, hardcore punk
- Years active: 2014-present
- Labels: OnTheAttack! Records, Thumper Punk Records
- Members: Richard Haro; Garrett Gutierrez; Isaac Guerrera; Tony Rangel
- Website: Rapture on Facebook

Rapture is a Christian hardcore punk band from San Francisco, California.

== History ==
The band formed in 2014 with vocalist Richard Haro and guitarist Garrett Gutierrez in San Francisco. The two of them later found drummer Tony Rangel. The three continued looking for a bassist, until Gutierrez contacted his cousin, Isaac Guerrera, who became the band's bassist. The band has been compared to bands such as Sleeping Giant, Comeback Kid, Dynasty, Terror and xLooking Forwardx. The band released their debut EP, Trials, in 2015 through Thumper Punk Records. The band later signed to OnTheAttack Records and released their second EP, Persevere. In March 2017, the band released a single for their upcoming album Victory, titled "Once to Die". The band's debut album, Victory, was released through OnTheAttack in 2017.

== Members ==
Current

- Richard Haro - vocals
- Garrett Gutierrez - guitars
- Isaac Guerrera - bass
- Tony Rangel - drums

== Discography ==
EPs

- Trials (2015, Thumper Punk)
- Persevere (2016, OnTheAttack)

Singles

- "Once to Die" (2017)

Studio albums

- Victory (2017, OnTheAttack)
- Unburned (2018, OnTheAttack)

Compilation appearances

- Metal From The Dragon (Vol. 1) (2017; The Bearded Dragon Productions)
