= Judgement X Day =

American band

Judgement Day
- Origin: California
- Genres: Metal hardcore, hardcore, metallic hardcore, Sludge hardcore
- Years active: 2014-present
- Labels: OnTheAttack! Records, Made in the USA Records
- Members: Levi Lehman; Brandon de Vincenzo; Travis Phillips; Estaban Baena; Joe Nunn; Jake Kelley
- Past members: Michael
- Website: Judgement X Day on Facebook

Judgement X Day or Judgement Day is a metal hardcore straight-edge band from Southern California.

== History ==
Judgement X Day formed in 2013. The band's lineup at the time was Vocalist Levi Lehman, Guitarists Michael and Brandon de Vincenzo, Bassist Travis Phillips and Drummer Joe Nunn. The band released a demo in November of that year, months after they formed. The demo featured Tommy Green, of bands such as Sleeping Giant and xDeathstarx. In June 2014, the band signed to OnTheAttack Records, a Christian hardcore label from San Francisco. The band released an EP titled The Altar in 2015 through OTA. The EP featured guest vocalists Chad Paramore of Messengers, Noah Friend of World of Pain, and Brandan Schieppati of Bleeding Through. The band is also signed to Made in the USA Records, owned by Levi Lehman the band's vocalist.

== Members ==
Current

- Levi Lehman - vocals
- Brandon De Vincenzo - guitars
- Estaban Baena - guitars
- Jake Kelley - guitars
- Travis Phillips - bass
- Joe Nunn - drums

Former

- Michael - guitars

== Discography ==
Demos

- Judgement Day (2013)

Splits

- Judgment Day X Strength (2014; w/ Strength)

EPs

- The Altar (2016)
- The Sun. The Darkness. (2020)
