= I Am Alpha and Omega =

American Christian hardcore punk band

- Origin: Flemington, New Jersey
- Genres: Christian hardcore, hardcore punk
- Years active: 2007–present
- Labels: Come&Live!
- Members: Donny Hardy; Peach Hardy; Ilya Fish; Scott Soffer; Dillon Thornberry
- Website: facebook.com/iamalphaandomega

I Am Alpha and Omega is an American Christian hardcore punk band from Flemington, New Jersey. The band started making music in 2007. Their membership is Donny Hardy, Peach Hardy, Ilya Fish, Scott Soffer, and Dillon Thornberry. The band released an independently made extended play, Georgia May, in 2008. They signed to Come&Live! Records, where they released, The War I Wage, an extended play, in 2009. Their first studio album, The Roar and the Whisper, was released by Come&Live! Records, in 2010.

"I am Alpha and Omega" is said by God in the Book of Revelation (Apocalypse).

== Background ==
I Am Alpha and Omega is a Christian hardcore band from Flemington, New Jersey. Their members are lead vocalist, Donny Hardy, guitarist, Ilya Fish and Dillon Thornberry, bassist, Scott Soffer, and drummer, Peach Hardy.

== Music history ==
The band commenced as a musical entity in 2007, with their first release, Georgia May, an extended play, that was released independently in 2008, while they released another extended play independently, The War I Wage, in 2009, with Come&Live! Records. They released, a studio album, The Roar and the Whisper, on September 5, 2010, with Come&Live! Records.

== Members ==
- Donny Hardy – vocals
- Ilya Fish – guitar
- Dillon Thornberry – guitar
- Scott Soffer – bass
- Peach Hardy – drums

== Former members ==
- Tom Aversa – electribe
- Corey Boston – bass
- Gunner Brand – guitar
- Joel Dill – guitar
- John Doe – guitar
- Colin Falzone – bass
- Brad Hardy – guitar
- Sean Kalaras – bass
- Josh "Rosey" Kassinger – guitar
- Kyle Mayer – keyboards/pig squeals
- Ryan McDavid – guitar
- Bill Mick – drums
- Kyle Reut – electribe
- Chris Sailer – guitar
- Jason Savage – bass
- Tom Seal – guitar
- Dennis Summers – bass
- Dillon Thornberry – guitar
- Matt Tobin – electribe

== Discography ==
Studio albums

- The Roar and the Whisper (September 5, 2010, Come&Live! Records)

EPs

- Georgia May (July 7, 2007, Independent)
- The War I Wage (May 8, 2009, Come&Live! Records)
