= Christ's Sake =

American Christian hardcore/rock band

- Origin: Huntington Beach, California
- Genres: Christian hardcore, Christian rock, Christian alternative rock, hardcore punk, pop punk, punk rock
- Years active: 2011–present
- Labels: Thumper Punk
- Members: Lance Hendren; Dillion Hendren; Sandra Calvillo; Matt Vangalapudi; Vinny Morales; Matt Killian
- Website: facebook.com/pages/Christs-Sake/255678031136587

Christ's Sake is an American Christian hardcore and Christian rock band, which plays primarily hardcore punk, punk rock, and alternative rock. The band is from Huntington Beach, California and started making music in 2011. Its members are lead vocalist Dillon Hendren, vocalist and lead guitarist Lance Hendren, background vocalist Sandra Calvillo, bassist Matt Vangalapudi, and drummer Vinny. Its first studio album, Christ's Sake, was released in 2012 by Thumper Punk Records. The subsequent studio album, We All Fall Down, was released by Thumper Punk Records, in 2014.

== Background ==
Christ's Sake is a Christian hardcore and Christian rock band from Huntington Beach, California. Their members are lead vocalist, Dillon Hendren, vocalist and lead guitarist, Lance Hendren, lead guitarist, Matt Killian, background vocalist, Sandra Calvillo, bassist, Matt Vangalapudi, and drummer, Vinnie.

== Music history ==
The band commenced as a musical entity in 2011 with their release, Christ's Sake, a studio album, that was released by Thumper Punk Records on October 27, 2012. Their subsequent studio album, We All Fall Down, was released on July 23, 2014 by Thumper Punk Records.

== Members ==
Current members

- Dillon Hendren - lead vocals
- Lance Hendren - lead guitar, vocals
- Sandra Calvillo - background vocals
- Matt Vangalapudi - bass
- Vinny Morales - drums

== Discography ==
Studio albums

- Christ's Sake (October 27, 2012, Thumper Punk)
- We All Fall Down (July 23, 2014, Thumper Punk)

== See also ==
- Christian music
- Christian rock
