= Metanoia (Chilean band) =

Chilean Christian hardcore band

- Origin: Temuco, Chile
- Genres: Christian hardcore, hardcore punk, punk rock, skate punk
- Years active: 2012–present
- Label: Thumper Punk
- Members: Benjamin Lopez; Diego Rivera; Claudio Bolivar; Cristobal Lopez
- Website: facebook.com/metanoiarock

Metanoia is a Chilean Christian hardcore band, and they primarily play hardcore punk, punk rock, and skate punk. They come from Temuco, Chile. The band started making music in 2012, and their members are lead vocalist and bassist, Benjamin Lopez, lead guitarist and background vocalist, Diego Rivera, and rhythm guitarist, Claudio Bolivar, and drummer, Cristobal Lopez. The band released, Promise of Restoration, an independently-made extended play, in 2012. Their first studio album, Retroceder Nunca, was released in 2012 by Thumper Punk Records.

== Background ==
Metanoia is a Christian hardcore band from Temuco, Chile. Their members are lead vocalist and bassist, Benjamin Lopez, lead guitarist and background vocalist, Diego Rivera, and rhythm guitarist, Claudio Bolivar, and drummer, Cristobal Lopez.

== Music history ==
The band commenced as a musical entity in 2012 with their release, Promise of Restoration, an extended play, that was released independently on February 25, 2012. Their first studio album, Retroceder Nunca, was released on September 13, 2012 by Thumper Punk Records. The second studio album, Chili-Nation, was released on November 17, 2015, from Thumper Punk Records.

== Members ==
Current members

- Benjamin Lopez - lead vocals, bass
- Diego Rivera - lead guitar, background vocals
- Claudio Bolivar - rhythm guitar
- Cristobal Lopez - drums

== Discography ==
Studio albums

- Retroceder Nunca (September 13, 2012, Thumper Punk)
- Chili-Nation (November 17, 2015, Thumper Punk)

EPs

- Promise of Restoration (February 25, 2012, Independent)
