= Yours For Mine =

American indie band

- Origin: Harrisonburg, Virginia
- Genres: Indie rock, post-hardcore, melodic metalcore, Christian hardcore
- Years active: 2006–2009, 2017–present
- Labels: Blood and Ink
- Members: Chad Altenberger; Joey Testa; Benjamin Cooley; Stephen Minnick; Jonathan Woods
- Past members: Dan Rolen; Nathan Cooley
- Website: Yours For Mine on Facebook

Yours For Mine is an American hardcore band, mixing multiple genres of music including melodic metalcore, indie rock, post-hardcore, and Christian hardcore. They formed in Harrisonburg, Virginia and started making music in 2006, disbanded in the winter of 2009, but later reunited. The band released a studio album, Dear Children, in 2008 on Blood and Ink Records, and then released their follow-up album, Yours For Mine: How Dark the Night, thirteen years later in early 2021.

== Members ==
Current members

- Chad Altenberger
- Joey Testa
- Benjamin Cooley
- Stephen Minnick
- Jonathan Woods

== Discography ==
Studio albums

- Dear Children (January 1, 2008, Blood and Ink)
- Yours For Mine: How Dark the Night (March 19, 2021, Self-Released)
