= Flawed by Design =

American metalcore band

- Origin: Hickory, North Carolina, U.S.
- Genres: Christian metal, metalcore, Christian hardcore, groove metal
- Years active: 2011–present
- Labels: Rottweiler, Flawed by Design Music
- Members: Tony Greer; Shane Atkinson; Nick Ellis; Bobby Hoyle
- Past members: Davie Huffman; Dillon Reynolds
- Website: Flawed by Design on Facebook

Flawed by Design is an American metalcore band from Hickory, North Carolina.

== Background ==
Flawed by Design started in late 2011/early 2012 in Hickory, North Carolina, with founding members drummer Shane Atkinson and guitarist Tony Greer, who were former bandmates. The band added on vocalist Dillon Reynolds and bassist Davie Huffman in 2012. In 2014, the band entered the studio to record their debut album, A New Creation with producer Jamie King (For Today, Between the Buried and Me, Your Chance to Die). The album was released through Rottweiler Records in January 2015. On August 4, 2015, vocalist Dillon Reynolds and bassist Davie Huffman departed from the band due to creative and personal differences. The band is currently working on a full-length CD with new bassist Bobby Hoyle and vocalist Nick Ellis.

== Members ==
Current

- Tony Greer – guitars (2011–present)
- Shane Atkinson – drums (2011–present)
- Nick Ellis – vocals (2017–present)
- Bobby Hoyle – bass (2017–present)

Former

- Davie Huffman – bass (2012–2015)
- Dillon Reynolds – vocals (2012–2015)

== Discography ==
Studio albums

- A New Creation (2015, Rottweiler Records)
- Resurrection (2021, Flawed by Design Music)

Singles

- "Thief Among Kings" (2017)
- "Keep It Steady" (2017)

Compilation appearances

- Metal from the Dragon (Vol. 2) (2017, The Bearded Dragon Productions)
- Metal for a Fallen World (Vol. 1) (2018, The Covenant Metal Show)
- Rottweiler Records The Pack (Vol. 1) (2016, Rottweiler Records)
- United We Skate (Vol. 3) (2015, Thumper Punk Records SkyBurnsBlack Records)
