= Ambassadors of Shalom =

British Christian hardcore/rock band

- Origin: United Kingdom
- Genres: Christian hardcore, Christian rock, Christian alternative rock, hardcore punk, pop punk, punk rock
- Years active: 2012–present
- Label: Thumper Punk
- Members: Pete Field; Neil Roddy; Joe Wilson
- Website: facebook.com/AmbassadorsOfShalom

Ambassadors of Shalom is a British Christian hardcore and Christian rock band, and they primarily play hardcore punk, punk rock, and alternative rock. They come from the United Kingdom. The band started making music in 2012, and their members are lead vocalist and bassist, Pete Field, vocalist and lead guitarist, Neil Roddy, and drummer, Joe Wilson. Their first studio album, Abdicate Self, was released in 2014 by Thumper Punk Records.

== Background ==
Ambassadors of Shalom is a Christian hardcore and Christian rock band from the United Kingdom. Their members are lead vocalist and bassist, Pete Field, vocalist and lead guitarist, Neil Roddy, and drummer, Joe Wilson.

== Music history ==
The band commenced as a musical entity in January 2012 with their release, Abdicate Self, a studio album, that was released by Thumper Punk Records on 11 February 2014.

== Members ==
Current members

- Pete Field - lead vocals, bass
- Neil Roddy - lead guitar, vocals
- Joe Wilson - drums

== Discography ==
Studio albums

- Abdicate Self (February 25, 2014, Thumper Punk)
