= The Old-Timers =

South African Christian hardcore band

The Old-timers
- Origin: South Africa
- Genres: Christian hardcore, hardcore punk, punk rock, crossover thrash
- Years active: 2011–present
- Label: Thumper Punk
- Members: xDave Old-Timerx; Don Old-timerr; Phil Old-timer
- Past members: Bob Old-timer; Matt Old-timer
- Website: facebook.com/theoldtimers

The Old-timers is a South African Christian hardcore band that primarily plays hardcore punk and punk rock. The band started making music in 2011, and their members currently consist of vocalist, xDave Old-Timerx, with guitar noises by Don Old-timer and drum thumping by Phil Old-timer (Who also drums for False Idle). They signed to Thumper Punk Records for their first studio album, Soli Deo Gloria, which was released in 2012 by Thumper Punk Records alongside Veritas Vinyl. They are the first South African Christian punk band to be signed to an American record label. Since then, they have released two extended plays, Spiritus Sanctus, in 2013, and, Be Reconciled, in 2014, with Thumper Punk Records alongside Veritas Vinyl.

== Background ==
In 2011 Don send some music to Dave and they started putting tracks together for fun. The 'Punk's Not Dead, Nor Are We' demo came out of these sessions. This demo was sent to friends and through it the band were signed to Thumper Punk Records. They released 'SOLI DEO GLORIA in 2012 to much anticipation and have been actively releasing music via Thumper Punk ever since.

Dave & Don live in South Africa but have recruited drummers for each release from amongst their Thumper Punk Label mates in the USA.

== Music history ==
The band commenced as a musical entity in 2011 and put out their debut release, Soli Deo Gloria, a studio album with Thumper Punk Records, on 14 June 2012. First single off the album was "This City" a song that has now become a firm favourite amongst many OT fans, and which has helped solidify it as an anthem amongst many Christian and secular punks. They released, an extended play, Spiritus Sanctus, on 17 December 2013, with Thumper Punk Records. Their subsequent extended play, Be Reconciled, was released by Thumper Punk Records, on 1 July 2014. They released two extended play, Turn It Off, and Turn It Up!, on 1 August 2015, through Thumper Punk Records.

When it comes to mixing and mastering their music, The Old-timers work almost exclusively with Sef Idle of Simpul Studio, Boise, Idaho. He has been a mainstay within their musical career, working with them since SOLI DEO GLORIA in 2012. He is also set to appear as a guest vocalist in their upcoming EP.

== Members ==
Current members

- xDave Old-timerx – vocals
- Don Old-timer – bass, guitar
- Phil Old-timer – drums

Past members

- Matt Old-timer – drums (2011–2013)
- Bob Old-timer – drums (2013–2014)

== Discography ==
Demo

- Punks Not Dead, And Nor Are We (1 December 2011, Independent)

Studio albums

- Soli Deo Gloria (14 June 2012, Thumper Punk)

EPs

- Spiritus Sanctus (17 December 2013, Thumper Punk)
- Be Reconciled (1 July 2014, Thumper Punk)
- Turn It Off (1 August 2015, Thumper Punk)
- Turn It Up! (1 August 2015, Thumper Punk)

Compilations

- "Kickin' It Old School" (1 June 2012, Veritas Vinyl)
- "Fleas Naughty Dog Vol.3" (3 December 2012, Indie Vision Music & Rottweiler)
- "Punk World Compilation Vol. 1 (22 December 2012, Green Goats Records)
- "Whatever68 radio Thanks To All! Compilation vol 1. (11 May 2013, PP Promo Records)
- "Food For Life Benefit Compilation" (2 August 2013, Thumper Punk)
- "Punk Never Dies Vol. 2" (1 September 2013, Indie Vision)
- "Punk 4 The Homeless – Doin' It for the Kids (3 January 2014, Punk4thehomelesscompilationuk)
- "Grok Radio Multi-Genre Compilation Vol 1" (8 January 2014, JCHC Slam and Dance Show)
- "2 Years Rockin You" (6 April 2014, PP Promo Records)
- "United We Skate Benefit Compilation" (16 June 2014, Thumper Punk)
- "Best of Fleas Naughty Dog (2014)" (Rottweiler)
- "Best of Fleas Naughty Dog (2015)" (Rottweiler)
