= Dependency (band) =

American Christian hardcore band

- Origin: Nashville, Tennessee
- Genres: Christian hardcore, hardcore punk, melodic hardcore
- Years active: 2009–present
- Labels: Blood and Ink
- Members: Kyle Fesmire; David Hobbs; John Michael McCasland; Jonathan Dalman; Charles Miller
- Website: facebook.com/DEPENDENCY

Dependency is an American Christian hardcore band, where they primarily play a hardcore punk and melodic hardcore styles of music. They come from Nashville, Tennessee. The band started making music in 2009. The band released an extended play, Convicted, in 2010, with Blood and Ink Records. Their subsequent release, Love Not Wasted, a studio album, was released by Blood and Ink Records, in 2012.

== Background ==
Dependency is a Christian hardcore band from Nashville, Tennessee. Their members are lead vocalist, Kyle Fesmire, guitarists, David Hobbs and John Michael McCasland, bassist, Jonathan Dalman, and drummer, Charles Miller.

== Music history ==
The band commenced as a musical entity in 2009, with their first release, Convicted, an extended play, that was released on May 25, 2010, from Blood and Ink Records. Their subsequent release, a studio album, Love Not Wasted, was released by Blood and Ink Records, on November 27, 2012.

== Members ==
Current members

- Kyle Fesmire - vocals
- David Hobbs - guitar
- John Michael McCasland - guitar
- Jonathan Dalman - bass
- Charles Miller - drums

== Discography ==
Studio albums

- Love Not Wasted (November 27, 2012, Blood and Ink)

EPs

- Convicted (May 25, 2010, Blood and Ink)
