= Enlow (band) =

American Christian hardcore/punk band

- Origin: Oklahoma
- Genres: Christian hardcore, Christian punk, hardcore punk, post-hardcore, punk rock
- Years active: 1998–2006
- Label: Blood and Ink

Enlow was an American Christian hardcore and Christian punk band, where they primarily played hardcore punk and post-hardcore. They come from Oklahoma. The band started making music in 1998 and disbanded around 2006. The band released a studio album, The Desperate Letters, in 2003, with Blood and Ink Records. Their subsequent album, The Recovery, was released by Blood and Ink Records, in 2006. They are currently slated to be headlining PromCore (May 18th) in Tulsa, OK at The Vanguard Tulsa

== Background ==
Enlow was a Christian hardcore and Christian punk band from Tulsa, OK.

== Music history ==
The band commenced as a musical entity in 1998, with their first release, The Desperate Letters, a studio album, that was released in 2003, from Blood and Ink Records. Their subsequent release, another studio album, The Recovery, was released by Blood and Ink Records, on January 24, 2006.

== Members ==
- Joel Holmes - Vocals
- Aaron Johnson - Guitar
- Chris Hicks - Guitar
- Michael Franco - Bass
- Myk Karasek - Drums

== Discography ==
Studio albums

- The Desperate Letters (2003, Blood and Ink) - Artwork by Burns Thornton
- The Recovery (January 24, 2006, Blood and Ink)
