= See the Rise =

American Christian hardcore/rock band

- Also known as: STR
- Origin: Minneapolis, Minnesota
- Genres: Christian hardcore, hardcore punk, post-hardcore, metalcore
- Years active: 2011–2014, 2015-2016
- Labels: Voluminous
- Members: Josh Meyers; Brian Elliott; Jason Law; Andrew Davis; Kyle Zahorski
- Past members: Kevin Phonsavanh; Kyle Hagberg
- Website: seetherise.com

See the Rise is an American Christian hardcore and Christian rock band, and they primarily play hardcore punk, post-hardcore and alternative rock. They come from Minneapolis, Minnesota. The band started making music in 2011, and their lead vocalist is Josh Meyers. They have released one studio album, Exposures, in 2015, with Voluminous Records. The band announced their final show for December 3, 2016.

== Background ==
See the Rise is a Christian hardcore and Christian rock band from Minneapolis, Minnesota, where they formed in 2011, with their current line-up being vocalist, Josh Meyers, background vocalist and guitarist, Brian Elliott, guitarist, Jason Law, bassist, Andrew Davis, and drummer, Kyle Zahorski.

== Music history ==
The band commenced as a musical entity in 2011, with their first studio album, Exposures, that was released on June 30, 2015, from Voluminous Records.

== Members ==
Current members

- Josh Meyers – vocals (2011-present)
- Brian Elliott – guitar, background vocals
- Jason Law – guitar
- Andrew Davis – bass
- Kyle Zahorski – drums

== Discography ==
Studio albums

- Exposures (June 30, 2015, Voluminous Records)

EPs

- The Theft (2013)
