= Saints Never Surrender =

American band

- Origin: Fort Wayne, Indiana
- Genres: Christian hardcore, metalcore, hardcore punk, melodic hardcore
- Years active: 2003–2009
- Label: Blood and Ink
- Website: facebook.com/pages/Saints-Never-Surrender/187117084254

Saints Never Surrender was an American band, who primarily played hardcore punk and melodic hardcore styles of music hailing from Fort Wayne, Indiana. The band begun making music and performing locally in 2003. After signing a record deal with Blood and Ink Records in 2007, several nationwide tours and two studio albums, the group officially disbanded in 2009.

== Background ==
Saints Never Surrender was a hardcore band from Fort Wayne, Indiana. They started as a band in 2003 and disbanded in 2009. On April 14, 2012, the band reunited one last time to play the Stand Together Fest in Nashville, Tennessee.

== Music history ==
The band commenced as a musical entity in 2003. Their first release was an extended play entitled Set Our Hearts to Burn, which was released independently by the band on December 13, 2006. Their first studio album Hope for the Best, Prepare for the Worst was released by Blood and Ink Records on May 8, 2007. The subsequent release Brutus was also released with Blood and Ink Records on July 15, 2008.

== Members ==
- Stephen Boyd – drums (2003–2008)
- Jesse Boyd – guitars (2006)
- Tony Biard – vocals (2003–2008)
- Tyler Lebamoff – bass (2003–2009)
- Max Hatlem – guitars (2003–2009)
- Jon Swain – guitars (2008–2009)
- Mason Hunter – vocals (2008)
- Jordan Witzigreuter – drums (2008–2009)
- Dylan Johnstone – vocals (2009)
- Mitchell Green – bass/vocals (2003–2008)
- James Holm – Two-step/pick up change (2005–2009)
- Michael Davison – Hype-man/percussion (2004–2005)
- Mike Pfeiffer – guitars (2004–2006)
- Cliff Mitchell – guitars (2005–2006)

== Discography ==
Studio albums

- Hope for the Best, Prepare for the Worst (May 8, 2007, Blood and Ink)
- Brutus (July 15, 2008, Blood and Ink)

EPs

- Set Our Hearts to Burn (December 13, 2006, Saints Never Surrender)
