= Jawbone (band) =

American hardcore punk band

- Origin: Evansville, Indiana
- Genres: Christian hardcore, hardcore punk
- Years active: 2009–present
- Labels: Blood & Ink Records
- Members: Clint Vaught; Aaron Travis; Hieronymus Mitchell; Neil Engleman
- Website: facebook.com/JawboneHC

Jawbone is an American band who primarily play hardcore punk. Their first EP, Loss of Innocence, was released in 2011 by Blood and Ink Records.

== Background ==
Jawbone originated in Evansville, Indiana in 2009. The band's members are lead vocalist Clint Vaught, lead guitarist Aaron Travis, bassist Hieronymus Mitchell, and drummer Neil Engleman.

== Music history ==
The band commenced as a musical entity in 2009, with their release, Loss of Innocence, an EP, which was released by Blood and Ink Records on June 7, 2011.

== Members ==
Current

- Clint Vaught – vocals
- Aaron Travis – guitar (formerly of Torn)
- Hieronymus Mitchell – bass guitar
- Neil Engleman – drums (formerly of Torn)

== Discography ==
EPs

- Loss of Innocence (June 7, 2011, Blood & Ink)
