= Aggelos =

Colombian Christian metal band

- Origin: Medellín, Colombia
- Genres: Christian metal; unblack metal; doom metal; gothic metal; symphonic metal; neoclassical metal
- Years active: 2002–present
- Label: Rottweiler
- Members: Natalia Soto; Carolina Giraldo Sánchez; Juan Esteban Londoño; Jonathan Rueda; Duvan Lopez Posada
- Past members: Lady Diana Miranda; Johana Gallego; Milgan Narváez
- Website: facebook.com/AGGELOSband/

Aggelos (meaning Messenger) are a Colombian Christian metal band that makes unblack metal, doom metal, gothic metal, death metal, symphonic metal, and neoclassical metal music. They started making music together in 2002 and have released two studio albums, Mantos Purpúreos (2011) and Silentium (2016), the latter with Rottweiler Records.

== Background ==
The band originated in Medellín, Colombia, where they formed in 2002. The current members are vocalist and guitarist, Natalia Soto; vocalist and bassist, Carolina Giraldo Sánchez; vocalist, Juan Esteban Londoño; guitarist and keyboardist, Jonathan Rueda; and drummer, Duvan Lopez Posada. Past members were vocalist, Lady Diana Miranda; drummer Johana Gallego; and guitarist, Milgan Narvaez.

== Music history ==
Their first studio album, Mantos Purpúreos, was released in 2011. The band is signed to Rottweiler Records. On 11 March 2016, they released Silentium, a second studio album.

== Members ==
Current members

- Natalia Soto – vocals, guitar (2002–present)
- Carolina Giraldo Sánchez – vocals, bass (2002–present)
- Juan Esteban Londoño – vocals (2006–present)
- Jonathan Rueda – guitar, keys (2002–present)
- Duvan Lopez Posada – drums (2011–present)

Former members

- Lady Diana Miranda – vocals (2002-2010)
- Johana Gallego – drums (2002-2010)
- Milgan Narváez – guitar

== Discography ==
Studio albums

- Mantos Purpúreos (2011)
- Silentium (11 March 2016, Rottweiler)
