= Creations (band) =

Australian Christian hardcore/metal band

- Origin: Sydney, NSW, Australia
- Genres: Christian hardcore, Christian metal
- Years active: 2009–2016
- Labels: Mediaskare, Rite of Passage
- Members: Thomas Hirst; Jared Laycock; Jonny Blackwell; Mike Mitchell
- Past members: Michael Foss; Blake Carter; James Thorpe; Blair Gowan
- Website: facebook.com/CREATIONSHC

Creations were an Australian Christian hardcore and Christian metal band who primarily played Beatdown Hardcore with Metalcore influences. They come from Sydney, NSW, Australia. The band started making music in 2009. Their first two studio albums, The Gospel and Unworthy/Humility, were released by Mediaskare Records alongside Rite of Passage Music, correspondingly in 2011 and 2013. The band announce they were disbanding in 2016.

== Background ==
Creations were a Christian hardcore and Christian metal band of the melodic deathcore variety, Hailing from Sydney, NSW, Australia, they became a musical entity in 2009. Their final lineup consisted of vocalist Thomas Hirst, guitarist Jared Laycock, bassist Jonny Blackwell, and drummer Mike Mitchell, while their former members were vocalist Michael Foss, guitarists Blake Carter and James Thorpe, and drummer Blair Gowan.

== Music history ==
The band commenced their musical recording careers in 2009. Their first studio album, The Gospel, was released on 30 August 2011 with Mediaskare Records and Rite of Passage Music. Their second studio album, Unworthy/Humility, was released on 11 June 2013, from Mediaskare Records.

== Members ==
Final line-up

- Thomas Hirst – vocals
- Jared Laycock – guitar
- Jonny Blackwell – bass
- Mike Mitchell – drums

Past members

- Michael Foss – vocals
- Blake Carter – guitar
- James Thorpe – guitar
- Blair Gowan – drums

== Discography ==
Studio albums

- The Gospel (30 August 2011, Mediaskare/Rite of Passage)
- Unworthy/Humility (11 June 2013 Mediaskare)

EPs

- Ruined (2009, Independent)

Singles

- "Boom", originally performed by P.O.D., released on Goes Undercover compilation (2013)
