= Clear Convictions =

Puerto Rican Christian hardcore band

- Also known as: CC
- Origin: Ponce, Puerto Rico
- Genres: Christian hardcore, metalcore, hardcore
- Years active: 1999–2016, 2019–present
- Labels: Strike First, On The Attack, Blood & Ink
- Members: Daniel Maldonado; David Fernandez; Orlando Diaz; Gabriel Serrano; Luis Vazquez
- Past members: Enzo; Natanael; Tony Rosario
- Website: Clear Convictions on Facebook

Clear Convictions is a five-piece hardcore band based in Florida. Originally from Puerto Rico, formed in 1999.

== History ==
In 2002, the band released their first self-titled demo, distributed by Facedown Records worldwide. In 2004, Clear Convictions had its first tour outside of Puerto Rico in South America, which allowed them to have a deal with Strike First Records a subdivision from Facedown. Their first contract with Strike First Records opened doors to an all-U.S. tour and led them to record their first full-length album “Warning” in 2006. After touring on the East Coast in 2008, the band signed a deal with On The Attack Records and recorded the album “Mystery of Iniquity” distributed by Blood & Ink Records. The band has played with Inked in Blood, xLooking Forwardx, No Innocent Victim, Figure Four, and Seventh Star. The band announced that they had disbanded on December 31, 2016.

Clear Convictions shared the stage with many well-known acts at the Cornerstone Festival 2011. After this, the band decided to take some time off the road to focus on what actions would lead to a better reach and decided to relocate to Florida, where they are now based. In 2012, the band recorded and produced their independent album titled “A Past That Attempts to Define Me” which put their stamp on the Central Florida Hard Core Scene. After the video release of their singles “Enemies of God” and “Counter Culture” the attention was very noticeable and grew even more.

Clear Convictions played many local gigs and festivals, such as Fire and Fury, The Unified Underground Festival in Kentucky and many others.In 2015, after gaining a lot of new recognition, Clear Convictions recorded an EP titled “New Seasons” and released a lyric video for the first single titled “Medias Exposed Deceit” and later released an official video for the song “Persecution Come”.

Now, in 2024, Clear Convictions has recorded their brand-new album titled “Endure” and released three new singles, including a lyric video for the song titled “Welcome To The Last Days”. That gained fast attention from a variety of listeners and supporters from all parts of the world. They are in the works to release an official video for the song “Endure”. More than a band, Clear Convictions is a vision where anyone can identify with and testify of their clear convictions to the world. This band has had the privilege to share stages with local & international acts and play for thousands of people. They have always seen these opportunities as blessings. Finally, Clear Convictions has a calling and purpose to go to the streets of the world and be a blessing to thosesurrounding them.

== Members ==
Current

- Daniel Maldonado – guitar (1999–2007), vocals (2007–present)
- David Fernandez – guitars
- Orlando Diaz – drums
- Gabriel Serrano – bass
- Luis Vazquez – guitars

Former

- Jerameel Lugo – guitar, bass
- Luis Vasquez – bass
- Enzo Medina – drums
- Natanael Maldonado – vocals
- Carlos Perez – guitars, backing vocals (2013–2016)
- Tim Pitsenbarger – drums
- Jesus Tossas – bass
- Tony Rosario – vocals (2014–2015)

== Discography ==
Demos

- Clear Convictions (2003)

EPs

- New Seasons (2015, Unsigned)

Studio albums

- Warning (2006, Strike First)
- Mystery of Iniquity (2008, On The Attack, Blood & Ink)
- A Past That Attempts to Define Me (2013, Unsigned)
- Endure (2024, Unsigned)https://open.spotify.com/album/21cLWTNGazFe3Qtycp2snL?si=PNUR1W1QRcWucuucxhHcfA
