= Undish =

Polish Christian gothic metal band

- Origin: Oborniki, Poland
- Genres: Christian metal, gothic metal
- Years active: 1991 – 2005
- Labels: CL Productions, Morbid Noizz Productions, Massacre Records
- Members: Ada Szarata (vocals); Robert Baum (vocals, drums); Michal Christoph (guitar, guitar synthesizer); Andrzej Walensiak (bass); Gracjan Jeran (guitar)
- Past members: Darek Was (bass); Micha³ Branny (guitar)
- Website: www.undish.com

Undish was a Christian gothic metal band from Oborniki, Poland, formed in 1991. Undish is led by female vocalist Ada Szarata as well as a male vocalist named Robert Baum who is also handling the drums. After the release of their first album, ...Acta Est Fabula, on Massacre Records, they toured Europe in August 1997 together with Saviour Machine and Theatre of Tragedy, and performed at Wacken Open Air. Their second album, Letters from the Earth, was released on Morbid Noizz Productions. The band was planning to record a third album entitled A Gift of Flying in 2003 but its release was delayed until 2005 when it was released on CL Productions.

== Biography ==
Undish was originally known as Graviora Manent and was formed in 1991 by Robert Baum (drums and vocals), Michal Christoph (guitar, guitar synthesizer), Darek Was (bass) and Michal Branny (guitar). The band played death and thrash metal styles at first. They released demos Pain (1991) and Moving Pictures (1994), and had a record deal with Altheya Project Records.

Darek Was and Michal Branny left Graviora Manent and around 1995 the band was joined by Ada Szarata (female vocals), Andrzej Walensiak (bass) and Gracjan Jeran (guitar). During this line up change in 1995 they began playing gothic metal, and recorded their first album ...Acta Est Fabula in Poland, 1996. In 1997 the band name was changed to Undish and they were signed to Massacre Records. Undish rerecorded ...Acta Est Fabula in Germany after the record deal and Massacre Records published ...Acta Est Fabula to wider audience. Afterwards they toured Europe, specifically Germany, Switzerland, and Austria, together with Saviour Machine, Theatre of Tragedy, Alastis, and Aion. During that tour, Undish performed in Wacken Open Air.

For the next three years, Undish worked on their second album, Letters from the Earth. The album was only published in Poland by the label Morbid Noizz Productions in 1999. Musically, it was considered a step ahead from ...Acta Est Fabula.

Their third album, A Gift of Flying took them four years of work, and was supposed to be released in February 2003. However, the album was delayed until 2005 when the label CL Productions released the album.

== Music ==
Undish's music is characterized by a dark and ethereal atmosphere, doom metal and gothic rock influenced guitars, and the deep and somber vocals of both Ada Szarata and Robert Baum. The vocals have a strong Polish accent. Undish 2005 album, A Gift of Flying shows a more impassioned style with a more laidback yet dark atmosphere.

== Discography ==
- …Acta Est Fabula (1997)
- Letters from the Earth (1999)
- A Gift of Flying (2005)
