= Debtor (band) =

American Christian hardcore band

- Origin: Philadelphia, Pennsylvania
- Genres: Christian hardcore, hardcore punk, melodic hardcore
- Years active: 2007–present
- Labels: Blood & Ink Records
- Members: Alan; Scott; Joe; Josh; Jason
- Website: facebook.com/debtorhc

Debtor is an American Christian hardcore band, and they primarily play hardcore punk and melodic hardcore. They come from Philadelphia, Pennsylvania. The band started making music in 2007. The band released an extended play, Deliverance, in 2009, with Blood and Ink Records. Their first studio album, Bloodseeds, was released by Blood and Ink Records, in 2011.

== Background ==
Debtor is a Christian hardcore band from Philadelphia, Pennsylvania. They count as their members Alan Popoli, Scott Rudy, Joe Motson, Josh Galloway, and Jason Warner.

== Music history ==
The band commenced as a musical entity in September 2007, with their first release, Deliverance, an extended play, that was released on December 9, 2009, from Blood and Ink Records. Their subsequent release, a studio album, Bloodseeds, was released by Blood and Ink Records on July 9, 2011.

== Members ==
Current members

- Alan Popoli - Vocals
- Scott Rudy - Bass
- Joe Motson - Guitar
- Josh Galloway - Drums
- Jason Warner - Guitar

== Discography ==
Studio albums

- Bloodseeds (July 9, 2011, Blood and Ink)

EPs

- Deliverance (December 9, 2009, Blood and Ink)
