= The Hoax (band) =

American Christian hardcore band

- Origin: Anaheim, California
- Genres: Christian hardcore, hardcore punk
- Years active: 2005–present
- Label: Thumper Punk
- Members: Tyler Dunagan; Ricky "Johnny Hoax" Madson; Daniel "Danimal" Cathers; David Robledo
- Past members: Matt "Navajo Joe" Dreer
- Website: facebook.com/thehoaxpunx

The Hoax is an American Christian hardcore band, and they primarily play hardcore punk. They come from Anaheim, California. The band started making music in 2005, and their members are lead vocalist, Tyler Dunagan, lead guitarist, Ricky "Johnny Hoax" Madson, bassist, David Robledo, and drummer, Daniel "Danimal" Cathers, with their former bassist, Matt "Navajo Joe" Dreer. The band have released one extended play, Fight to Be Free, in 2009, with Thumper Punk Records. Their first studio album, Stumbling Through, was released in 2011 by Thumper Punk Records.

== Background ==
The Hoax is a Christian hardcore band from the cities of Anaheim, California. Their members are lead vocalist, Tyler Dunagan, lead guitarist, Ricky "Johnny Hoax" Madson, bassist, David Robledo, and drummer, Daniel "Danimal" Cathers, with their former bassist, Matt "Navajo Joe" Dreer.

== Music history ==
The band commenced as a musical entity in January 2005, with their release, Fight to Be Free, an extended play, being released by Thumper Punk Records on April 1, 2009. Their first studio album, Stumbling Through, was released on May 4, 2011, by Thumper Punk Records.

== Members ==
Current members

- Tyler Dunagan - lead vocals
- Ricky "Johnny Hoax" Madson - lead guitar
- David Robledo - bass
- Daniel "Danimal" Cathers - drums

Past members

- Matt "Navajo Joe" Dreer - bass

== Discography ==
Studio albums

- Stumbling Through (May 4, 2011, Thumper Punk)

EPs

- Free to Be Free (April 1, 2009, Thumper Punk)
