= Ten 33 =

American Christian hardcore band

- Origin: Richmond, Virginia
- Genres: Christian hardcore, hardcore punk, punk rock
- Years active: 2002–2006
- Label: Blood and Ink
- Past members: Stephen Poore; Joey Russo; Matt Wentz; Zach Wentz; Zach Nelson
- Website: facebook.com/Ten33Hardcore

Ten 33 was an American Christian hardcore band, who primarily played a hardcore punk style of music. They came from Richmond, Virginia. The band started making music in 2002 and disbanded in 2006. The band released, a studio album, Emergency! Emergency!, in 2003, with Blood and Ink Records. Their subsequent album, Nightmare on Grace St., was released from Blood and Ink Records, in 2005.

== Background ==
Ten 33 was from Richmond, Virginia. Their members were vocalist Stephen Poore, guitarists Joey Russo, Billy Mutter and Matt Wentz, bassist Zach Wentz, saxophone player Sweet Lou, and drummer and drum machine player Zach Nelson. They formed in February 2002 and disbanded in July 2006.

== Music history ==
The band commenced as a musical entity in February 2002, with their first release, Emergency! Emergency!, a studio album, and it released in 2003, with Blood and Ink Records. Their subsequent studio album, Nightmare on Grace St., was released on June 28, 2005, by Blood and Ink Records. This would be their final release, as they disbanded in July 2006.

== Members ==
Past members

- Stephen Poore – vocals
- Joey Russo – guitar
- Matt Wentz – guitar
- Zach Wentz – bass
- Zach Nelson – drums
- Billy Mutter – guitar
- William P. Scruthers – maintenance

== Discography ==
Studio albums

- Emergency! Emergency! (2003, Blood and Ink)
- Nightmare on Grace Street (June 28, 2005, Blood and Ink)
- Sinking Ships (Single) (2018, Self-Released)
