= Platoon 1107 =

American punk rock music band

- Origin: California, United States
- Genres: Hardcore punk, patriotic punk, skate punk, crossover thrash, Christian punk
- Years active: 2012–present
- Labels: Thumper Punk Records, Veritas Vinyl
- Members: Jimmy Sisco
- Website: facebook.com/Platoon1107

Platoon 1107 is an American patriotic punk rock music band that primarily plays heavy metal music influenced hardcore punk and skate punk, and at times crossover. This project was started in California in 2012 by a United States Marine Corps veteran, Jimmy Sisco, who writes and plays all the instruments on their recordings. The project's first two releases, with Thumper Punk Records and Veritas Vinyl, We Glory in the Title (a studio album), and an extended play, Live Free or Die, were released on the same day in 2012. The second extended play, Marine Forever...Forever Marine, was first self-released in December 2013. The project did a split-EP, with The Cants earlier the same year. In late 2016 the band issued four EP's in 5 weeks via Thumper Punk Records: The Tourettes EP, The Straight Edge EP, Marine Forever...Forever Marine, and the Alive I live album, which was recorded at Angel City in Bellflower, California in 2014.

== Background ==
Platoon 1107 is heavy metal influenced hardcore punk and skate punk project that sometimes incorporates crossover thrash. Themes of patriotism and military history are commonly addressed in their songs. The project is based in California. The founding member is Jimmy Sisco, who is a United States Marine Corps veteran, and who plays all the instruments on the project's recordings which he also records and produces. Platoon 1107 plays as a full band for live shows. The band name was taken from the recruit platoon at Marine Corps Recruit Depot San Diego that Jimmy graduated boot camp with.

== Music history ==
The musical project commenced as a musical entity in 2012, with their first two releases, We Glory in the Title, a studio album, and, an extended play, Live Free or Die, was released on October 16, 2012 by Thumper Punk Records and Veritas Vinyl. Their subsequent release, was a split-EP with Nashville, Tennessee band The Cants, which was released on June 18, 2013 from Thumper Punk Records. In October 2016, after two full years of no recording, Platoon released four EP's within four weeks on Thumper Punk Records: The Tourettes EP, The Straight Edge EP, The Marine Forever...Forever Marine EP, and the Alive I live album, recorded at Angel City in Bellflower, California in 2014. In 2017, Platoon 1107 will release Volume I: 2012-2013 which will consist of their whole catalog of 24 songs during the first two years. To be released at the same time will be Volume II: The EP Series which will consist of all four EP's released in late 2016, along with unreleased songs.

== Members ==
Current members

- Jimmy Sisco - all vocals, guitars, bass, recording, mixing, production

== Discography ==
Studio albums

- We Glory in the Title (October 16, 2012, Thumper Punk/Veritas Vinyl)
- Volume I: 2012-2013 (TBD, Thumper Punk Records, Veritas Vinyl)
- Volume II: The 2016 EP Series (TBD, Thumper Punk Records)

EPs

- Live Free or Die (October 16, 2012, Thumper Punk)
- Platoon 1107 / The Cants split EP (June 18, 2013, Thumper Punk)
- The Tourettes EP (August 22, 2016, Thumper Punk)
- The Straight Edge EP (September 6, 2016, Thumper Punk)
- Marine Forever...Forever Marine (September 13, 2016, Thumper Punk)
- Alive I (September 20, 2016, Thumper Punk)
