= Remembrance (band) =

American Christian metalcore band

- Origin: Lansing, Michigan
- Genres: Christian metal, Metalcore
- Years active: 2003–2008
- Label: Sancrosanct Records
- Past members: Adam Klein; Jeff Schantz; Joel Matthews; Matthew Weir; Aaron Woods; Tony Padilla; Josh Reed; Damon Reed; Erin Conlin; Jim Conlin; Tab

Remembrance was a Christian metalcore band formed during the winter of 2003 in Lansing, Michigan. They played shows with bands such as Underoath, Maylene & The Sons of Disaster, Advent, Saints Never Surrender, War of Ages, Common Yet Forbidden, No Innocent Victim, Aletheian, Spoken (band), Bloodlined Calligraphy, Dagon, and The Burial. Remembrance released two independent EPs before releasing their full-length label debut Beyond the Scope of Reason in May 2007 on Sancrosanct Records [sic]. They broke up in 2008. Matthew Weir moved on to play drums for Sleeping Giant and currently tours with Holy Name. Tony Padilla ran Sancrosanct Records, the label the band was signed to, until its closing.

== Members ==
Last Known Line-up

- Adam Klein - Vocals (2003–2008)
- Jeff Schantz - Guitar
- Joel Matthews - Guitar
- Aaron Woods - Bass
- Matthew Weir - Drums

Former members

- Tony Padilla - Lead Guitar (2003-2007)
- Josh Reed - Guitar (2004-2005)
- Erin Conlin - Bass (2003-2004)
- Jim Conlin - Drums (2003-2004)
- Damon Reed - Bass (2004)
- Tab - Bass (2005)

== Discography ==
EPs

- A Diary of Hope and Heartache - (2004) (Independent EP)
- Under Angel's Wings - (2006) (Independent EP).

Albums

- Beyond the Scope of Reason - (2007) (Sancrosanct Records).
