= Thin Ice (band) =

American hardcore band

- Origin: San Antonio, Texas, U.S.
- Genres: hardcore, metalcore
- Years active: 2009–present
- Label: Blood and Ink
- Members: Jake Gallegos; Drew O'Neal; Brody Raney; Nick Gonzales; Forrest Eleuterius
- Past members: Phil Gallegos; Chris Cosgrove; Evan Warren; Bruce Gonzales
- Website: facebook.com/thinicehc

Thin Ice is an American hardcore band, where they primarily play a hardcore punk style of music. They come from San Antonio, Texas. The band started making music in 2009. The band released an extended play, Revelation Through Tribulation, in 2010, with Blood and Ink Records. After a long hiatus, the album Misery Noose was self-released in late 2018. The band has recently finished recording a second LP with plans to release sometime in 2020.

== Members ==
Current

- Jake Gallegos – Vocals (2009–present)
- Drew O'Neal – Drums (2009–Present)
- Brody Raney – Guitar (2011 - 2020, 2022–Present)
- Nick Gonzales – Guitar (2011–Present)

Former

- Phil Gallegos – Vocals
- Chris Cosgrove – Guitar
- Evan Warren – Guitar
- Bruce Gonzales – Bass/vocals
- Forrest Eleuterius – Bass
- Darren A - Guitar/Bass

Touring

- Levi Miller - Bass
- Jaime Luna - Drums

== Discography ==
EPs

- Revelation Through Tribulation (May 25, 2010, Blood and Ink)

LPs

- Misery Noose (December 5, 2018 self-released)
- Ascending (2021, self released)
