= The Blue Letter =

American hardcore/metal band

- Origin: Richmond, Virginia
- Genres: Metallic hardcore, metal, emo, hardcore punk, metalcore, post-hardcore, screamo
- Years active: 2003–present
- Labels: Blood and Ink, Guevara Entertainment, Reactivation, Init Records
- Members: Dan Shebaylo; Brendan Artz; Silas Zdybel
- Past members: Chad Seely
- Website: facebook.com/theblueletter

The Blue Letter is an American hardcore/metal band. They primarily play emo, hardcore punk, metalcore, post-hardcore music, and describe their style as "down tempo screamo.” They come from Richmond, Virginia. The band started making music in 2003. The band released, a studio album, When Will These Barricades Fall, in 2004, with Reactivation Media. They released, a split-extended play, Splitsville, with The Gospel Is a Grenade, on Guevara Entertainment, in 2005. Their subsequent release, also an extended play, Prima Facie, was released in 2007, with Blood & Ink Records. The latest release, Love Is Not Control, was released by Init Records, in 2012.

== Background ==
The Blue Letter is a hardcore/metal band from Richmond, Virginia. Their members are guitarist and vocalist, Dan Shebaylo, bassist and vocalist, Brendan Artz, and drummer and vocalist Silas Zdybel. A former member, Chad Seely, a bassist and vocalist, left the band after the Prima Facie release.

== Music history ==
The band commenced as a musical entity in 2003, with their first release, When Will These Barridcades Fall, a studio album, that was released in 2004, from Reactivation Media Company. Their second release, a split-extended play, with The Gospel Is a Grenade, Splitsville, released in 2005, by Guevara Entertainment. The subsequent release, Prima Facie, was an extended play, that was released by Blood and Ink Records, in 2007. Their latest release, a studio album, Love Is Not Control, was released by Init Records, in 2012.

== Members ==
Current members

- Dan Shebaylo - guitar, vocals
- Brendan Artz - bass, vocals
- Silas Zdybel - drums, vocals

Former members

- Chad Seely – bass, vocals (2003-2007)
- Blake Merwin - guitar, vocals (2002-2004)

== Discography ==
Studio albums

- When Will These Barricades Fall (2004, Reactivation)
- Love Is Not Control (2012, Init Records)

EPs

- Prima Facie (2007, Blood and Ink)
