= Thirtyseven =

American pop punk band

- Origin: Dallas, Texas
- Genres: Pop punk, Indie, Alternative rock
- Years active: 2010–2020
- Label: Blood & Ink Records
- Members: Brandon Culpepper; Moses Campos; Dylan Russell
- Website: facebook.com/thirtyseventx

Thirtyseven was an American pop punk band from Dallas, Texas. The band started making music in 2010. The band released a studio album, This Is What I Want, in 2013, with Blood and Ink Records. They have disbanded as confirmed by Dylan Russell in April 2020.

== Background ==
Thirtyseven was a pop punk band from Dallas, Texas. Their members included Moses Campos (guitar, vocals), Dylan Russell (bass, vocals), and Brandon Culpepper (drums, backing vocals).

== Music history ==
The band commenced as a musical entity in 2010, with their first release, Get What You Deserve. This Is What I Want, a studio album, was released on August 6, 2013, from Blood & Ink Records.

== Members ==
Members

- Moses Campos – vocals, lead guitar
- Dylan Russell – vocals, bass
- Brandon Culpepper – drums

== Discography ==
Studio albums

- This Is What I Want (August 6, 2013, Blood and Ink)

Demos

- Get What You Deserve (2010)
