= Divide the Sea =

American Christian hardcore/metal band

- Origin: Greenville, South Carolina
- Genres: Christian hardcore, Christian metal, hardcore punk, metalcore, Southern Metal
- Years active: 2006–present
- Labels: Blood and Ink
- Members: Caleb Snead; Brett Sims; Jared Snead; Zach Paulus; Micah Snead
- Website: facebook.com/dividethesea

Divide the Sea is an American Christian hardcore and Christian metal band, where they primarily play a hardcore punk and metalcore styles of music. They come from Greenville, South Carolina. The band started making music in 2006. The band released, a studio album, Man, in 2010, with Blood and Ink Records.

== Background ==
Divide the Sea is a Christian hardcore and Christian metal band from Greenville, South Carolina. Their members are Caleb Snead, Brett Sims, Jared Snead, Zach Paulus, and Micah Snead.

== Music history ==
The band commenced as a musical entity in 2006, with their first release, Man, a studio album, that was released on January 26, 2010, from Blood and Ink Records. Levi MacAllister, reviewing the album for HM Magazine, states, "If Maylene and the Sons of Disaster had a baby, and old-Norma Jean/Luti-Kriss had a baby, and somehow, by the grace of God, those two babies got together and … had another baby – well, by golly, Divide The Sea’s fantastically produced Man would pop out with a bloodstream carrying a worshipful flare." Punknews.org rated the album one star, while Indie Vision Music rated it four stars.

== Members ==
Current members

- Caleb Snead
- Brett Sims
- Jared Snead
- Zach Paulus
- Micah Snead

Past members

- Ryan Turner
- Ben Patat
- Randall Rainey

== Discography ==
Studio albums

- Man (January 26, 2010, Blood and Ink)
