= Heaven's Force =

American musical group

- Origin: Fort Worth, Texas, United States
- Genres: Christian metal, thrash metal, power metal, speed metal
- Years active: 1983–1984
- Labels: Independent, Open Grave Records
- Past members: Dave Gryder; Kelly Berger; Chris Richie

Heaven's Force was an American Christian metal band that formed in Fort Worth, Texas in 1983. It is thought to be the first Christian thrash metal band. The band consisted of vocalist/drummer Dave Gryder, guitarist Chris Richie, and bassist Kelly Berger. Their debut demo, Aggressive Angel, was released in 1983 and their self-titled second demo was released the following year before the group disbanded in late 1984. In 2008, Richie committed suicide after a long time of depression. After this unfortunate event, Gryder stated during an interview in 2014 that the band would never reunite without their friend. The band re-released their demos via Open Grave Records on the compilation album Aggressive Angel in 2009. The band has been compared to Slayer, Venom, and Exciter.

== Members ==
Last known lineup

- Dave Gryder – vocals, drums
- Christopher "Chris" Richie – guitar (died 2008)
- Kelly Berger – bass guitar

== Discography ==
Heaven's Force discography
- Compilation albums: 1
- Demos: 2

Demos

- Aggressive Angel (1983)
- Heaven's Force (1984)

Compilation album

- Aggressive Angel (2009)

Compilation appearances

- Texas Metal Archives Volume One (2009; Metal Rising/Brainticket Records)
- Back in the Day: An Old School Compilation (2018; The Bearded Dragon Productions)
