= New Waters =

Finnish experimental hardcore band

- Origin: Jyväskylä, Finland
- Genres: Experimental hardcore, crossover thrash, thrashcore
- Years active: 2010–present
- Labels: Blood and Ink, Authentic Sounds
- Members: Miika Luoma; Oula Maaranen; Pete Huttunen; Ville Saarni; Henri Lahtinen
- Website: facebook.com/newwatersfin

New Waters is a Finnish experimental hardcore band, where they primarily play hardcore, crossover thrash, and thrashcore styles of music. They come from Jyväskylä, Finland. The band started making music in 2010. The band released an extended play, Lions, in 2013, with Blood and Ink Records. Their subsequent release, a studio album, Venture, was released in 2014, by Authentic Sounds.

== Background ==
New Waters is an experimental hardcore band from Jyväskylä, Finland. Their members are Miika, Oula, Pete, Ville, and Henri.

== Music history ==
The band commenced as a musical entity in February 2010, with their first release, Lions, an extended play, that was released on 12 February 2013, from Blood and Ink Records. Their subsequent release, a studio album, Venture, was released on 10 December 2014, with Authentic Sounds.

== Members ==
Current members

- Miika Luoma
- Oula Maaranen
- Pete Huttunen
- Ville Saarni
- Henri Lahtinen

== Discography ==
Studio albums

- Venture (10 December 2014, Authentic Sounds)
- Experience (4 April 2018, not on label)

EPs

- Lions (12 February 2013, Blood and Ink)
