= Behold the Kingdom =

American Christian metal/hardcore band

- Origin: Sidney, Ohio
- Genres: Christian metal, Christian hardcore, death metal, metalcore, deathcore, hardcore punk
- Years active: 2009–2013
- Labels: Rottweiler
- Past members: Josh Moon; Riley Snyder; Derrik Young; Mark Baker; Sebastian Salinas; Zach Robbins; Cliff Deweese
- Website: facebook.com/beholdthekingdom

Behold the Kingdom was an American Christian metal and Christian hardcore band, and they primarily played deathcore, metalcore, and hardcore punk. They come from Sidney, Ohio. The band started making music in 2009, and their membership was lead vocalist, Josh Moon, lead guitarists, Riley Snyder and Derrik Young, bassist, Mark Baker, and drummer, Cliff Deweese. Their first studio album, The Eyes of the Wicked Will Fail, was released by Rottweiler Records, in 2011, which was the only album from the band, who disbanded in 2013.

== Background ==
Behold the Kingdom is a Christian metal and Christian hardcore band from Sidney, Ohio. Their members were lead vocalist, Joseph Bellmer, lead guitarists, Riley Snyder and Derrik Young, bassist, Mark Baker, and drummer, Sebastian Salinas. Started in 2009 by Riley Snyder, Cliff Deweese, and Josh Moon, Behold The Kingdom performed under the name Arelim before adding Mark Baker and Derrik Young into the fold. Shortly after the additions of Baker and Young, the group underwent a name change and became Behold The Kingdom.

After beginning to play shows across Ohio and Indiana, Behold The Kingdom gained the attention of Standby Records (Before Their Eyes, Emarosa, Black Veil Brides) CEO Neil Sheehan. The band recorded two singles, "Poveglia" and "185,000" at Chin Music Studios in Cleveland, Ohio, a studio owned by Neil Sheehan. Shortly after recording both songs, vocalist Josh Moon parted ways with the band and vocalist Zach Robbins was chosen as his replacement. After the addition of Zach Robbins to the band, Behold The Kingdom began touring and expanding their fan base again. The band once again hit the studio with Saud Ahmed (The Crimson Armada, The Holy Guile) with Robbins on vocals. Soon after recording with Saud Ahmed, Zach Robbins parted ways with Behold The Kingdom and the band began searching for a new vocalist.

Rumors that original vocalist Josh Moon would rejoin the band began circulating, before the band settled on Joseph Bellmer as their new vocalist. After adding Bellmer, Behold The Kingdom began touring again and quickly grabbed the attention of Ft. Wayne, Indiana based Rottweiler Records. After negotiations, Behold The Kingdom was signed to Rottweiler Records and began recording their first full-length studio album, The Eyes of the Wicked Will Fail. Shortly after recording the album and following tours to support the release of the album, drummer Cliff Deweese decided to part ways with the band. After the departure of Deweese, the band began searching for a new drummer, before settling on Colorado native Sebastian Salinas to fill the void. After the addition of Salinas, the band continued to tour in support of the album, before disbanding in 2013.

It was recently announced on the group's Facebook page that there will be a reunion in 2017 or 2018, featuring the original members of the band (Moon, Snyder, Young, Baker, and Deweese).

== Music history ==
The band commenced as a musical entity in 2009, with their first release, The Eyes of the Wicked Will Fail, a studio album, that was released on August 12, 2011, by Rottweiler Records.

== Members ==
Last Known Line-up

- Joseph Bellmer - vocals
- Riley Snyder - guitar
- Derrik Young - guitar
- Mark Baker - bass
- Sebastian Salinas - drums

Past Members

- Zach Robbins - vocals
- Josh Moon - vocals
- Cliff Deweese - drums

Timeline

== Discography ==
Studio albums

- The Eyes of the Wicked Will Fail (August 12, 2011, Rottweiler)
