= Promise Land (band) =

Christian symphonic metal band

- Origin: Pittsburgh, Pennsylvania, United States
- Genres: Christian metal, symphonic metal, nu metal, hard rock
- Years active: 1997-present
- Labels: XNilo Records
- Members: Rod Kozikowski; David Michael; Shawn Naeser
- Past members: Alex Coyne; Eric Popp; Alan Mosovsky; Gary Bova; Eric Bowser
- Website: Official Website

Promise Land is a Christian symphonic metal band that originated in Pittsburgh, Pennsylvania and formed in 1997. It went on an unofficial hiatus around 2009. In 2010 there was a resurgence in the band.

== Members ==
Current

- David Michael – lead guitar, vocals, keyboards (1997–present)
- Rod Kozikowski – vocals, rhythm guitar (2010–present)
- Shawn Naeser – drums (2013–present)

Session

- Eric Popp – bass (1998–2000, 2013–present)

Former

- Alan Mosovsky – drums (1999–2000)
- Alex Coyne – rhythm guitar, backing vocals (1997–2009)
- Gary Bova – bass (2001–2013)
- Eric Bowser – drums (2001–2013)

Timeline

== Discography ==
EPs

- DRT (1997)
- Demo (2005)

Studio albums

- Harmony in Ruins (2014)
