= Strengthen What Remains =

American hardcore and metal band

- Origin: Tampa, Florida
- Genres: Christian hardcore, Christian metal, hardcore punk, metalcore
- Years active: 2010–2019; 2024 (one-off reunion)
- Labels: Blood and Ink Records, On the Attack
- Members: Josh White; Phil Amos; Danny Mills
- Website: facebook.com/strengthenwhatremains

Strengthen What Remains was an American hardcore and metal band. They came from Tampa, Florida. The band started making music in 2007. The band released a studio album, Humanity, in 2010, with On the Attack Records. They signed to Blood & Ink Records, where they released, Turning a Blind Eye, another studio album, in 2013. Their subsequent release, Justice Creeps Slow, an extended play was released by Blood and Ink Records, in 2015.

== Background ==
Strengthen What Remains was a hardcore band from Tampa, Florida. They counted as their members Josh White, Phil Amos, and Danny Mills.

== Music history ==
The band commenced as a musical entity in 2010, with their first release, Humanity, a studio album, that was released on November 1, 2010, from On the Attack Records. They were signed to Blood and Ink Records, where they released another studio album, Turning a Blind Eye, on August 13, 2013. Their subsequent release, an extended play, Justice Creeps Slow, was released on June 9, 2015, by Blood & Ink Records. Most recently, SWR released a 2017 Promo on January 27, 2017. The band announced that they plan to disband sometime in late 2018 or early 2019. They played their final show on January 4, 2019 during the FYA Fest 6 Pre-Show. A month later in February 2019, the band published their final two songs via Bandcamp, the two song release titled "Crisis of Faith". Members of the band have a new band, Exit Strategy. On December 21, 2024, they played a one-off reunion performance at Deviant Libation to benefit For The Children Florida.

== Members ==
Current members

- Josh White (2007-2019)
- Phil Amos (2016-2019)
- Danny Mills

Former members

- Dev Stroud (2010-2016)
- Joe Finney (2013-2014)
- Davy Ball (2011-2016)
- Anthony O'Neal
- Guy Gaffney (2011-2014)

== Discography ==
Studio albums

- Humanity (November 1, 2010, On the Attack)
- Turning a Blind Eye (August 13, 2013, Blood and Ink)

EPs

- Justice Creeps Slow (June 9, 2015, Blood and Ink)
- 2017 Promo (January 27, 2017, Blood and Ink)
- "Crisis of Faith" (February 6, 2019, Self Released via Bandcamp)
