= Day of Vengeance (band) =

American hardcore/metalcore band

- Origin: Bradenton, Florida, U.S.
- Genres: Christian hardcore, hardcore punk, metalcore
- Years active: 2009–present
- Labels: Red Cord
- Members: Josiah Hughes; Steven Spahn; Richard Tosch
- Past members: Ben Greene; Phillip Adams; Tyler Nelms
- Website: facebook.com/dayofvengeance

Day of Vengeance is an American Christian hardcore and metalcore band from Bradenton, Florida. The band started making music in 2009. Their membership is Josiah Hughes, Steven Spahn, and Richard Tosch. The band released an extended play, Day of Vengeance, in 2011, with Red Cord Records. They released three studio albums, He Who Has Ears, in 2010, Star Breather, in 2012, and, Crutchless, in 2013, all these were with Red Cord Records. They also released an EP in 2021 called Farewell.

== Background ==
Day of Vengeance is a Christian hardcore and Christian metal band from Bradenton, Florida. Their members are lead vocalist and lead guitarist, Josiah Hughes, bassist, Richard Tosch, and drummer, Steven Spahn.

== Music history ==
The band commenced as a musical entity in June 2009 by founding members Ben Greene and Josiah Hughes, with their first release, He Who Has Ears, a studio album, that was released by Red Cord Records on November 23, 2010. They released, an extended play, Day of Vengeance, on September 30, 2011, with Red Cord Records. The subsequent studio album, Star Breather, was released on June 5, 2012, by Red Cord Records. Their third album, Crutchless, was released on December 3, 2013, by Red Cord Records.

== Members ==
Current members

- Josiah Hughes – vocals, guitar
- Richard Tosch – bass
- Steven Spahn – drums

Past members

- Ben Greene – vocals
- Phillip Adams – guitar
- Tyler Nelms – drums
- Phil Cote - bass
- Casey McDaniel - bass

== Discography ==
Studio albums

- He Who Has Ears (November 2010, Red Cord Records)
- Star Breather (June 2012, Red Cord Records)
- Crutchless (December 2013, Red Cord Records)

EPs

- Day of Vengeance (September 2011, Red Cord Records)
- Farewell (December 2021)
