= The Red Baron (band) =

American Christian band

- Origin: West Palm Beach, Florida
- Genres: Christian hardcore, hardcore punk
- Years active: 2004–2009
- Labels: Blood and Ink, Dead Truth Recordings
- Past members: Phil Porto; Chase Babcock; Josiah Sampson; Josh Card; John Campbell
- Website: myspace.com/theredbaron

The Red Baron was an American Christian and straight edge band, where they primarily played a hardcore punk style of music. They come from West Palm Beach, Florida. The band started making music in 2004 and disbanded in 2009.

== Background ==
The Red Baron was a Christian hardcore band from West Palm Beach, Florida, whose lead singer was Phil Porto. They began playing as a band in 2004, only to disband in 2009.

== Music history ==
The band commenced as a musician entity in 2004, with their only full-length album, My First Love, coming out on April 7, 2009, with Blood and Ink Records.

== Discography ==
Studio albums

- split (with xBishopx) (2007, Dead Truth Recordings)
- My First Love (April 7, 2009, Blood and Ink)
