= Sleeping by the Riverside =

American Christian metalcore band

- Origin: Tampa Bay, Florida, United States
- Genres: Christian hardcore, melodic metalcore
- Years active: 1996–2003, 2021–present
- Labels: Indianola, Takehold

Sleeping by the Riverside is a Christian metalcore band that originated in Tampa Bay, Florida. The band formed in late 1996 and disbanded around 2003–2004. The band has had several lineup changes. Since leaving the band, members have joined bands such as, Underoath, Maylene and the Sons of Disaster, The Sugar Oaks, Affix Bayonets and Carry the Dead, who the band also did a split album with.

In 2021, the band announced a reunion for September 2021.

== Influences ==
The band states that their influences are Shai Hulud, Strongarm, and xCulturex.

== Members ==
- Adam Warshowsky - vocals
- Joe Harris - guitar
- Matt Gersting - guitar
- Kelly Scott Nunn - guitar, drums
- T.C. Smith - guitar
- Mike Curry - guitar
- Todd Moody - bass
- Kevin Roberts - bass
- Matt Clark - drums
- Luke Morton - guitar

== Discography ==
Studio albums

- Untitled (1999; Split w/ Carry the Dead)
- Breath Between Battles (2002)

EPs

- Sleeping by the Riverside (1999)
- Split (2000; split with Sward)
