= Foreknown =

American metalcore band

- Origin: Duluth, Minnesota
- Genres: Melodic metalcore, deathcore, metalcore
- Years active: 2000–2005
- Labels: Blood and Ink
- Past members: Sam Dean; Alan Isaacson; Seth Stepec; Nolan "Dougie" Johnson; Winter Montoya

Foreknown was an American metalcore band, where they primarily play a melodic metalcore and deathcore styles of music. They come from Duluth, Minnesota. The band started making music in 2000 and disbanded around 2005. The band released a studio album, Calm Seas Don't Make Sailors, in 2005, with Blood and Ink Records.

== Background ==
Foreknown was a metalcore band from Duluth, Minnesota. The band members were vocalist, Sam Dean, guitarist, Alan Isaacson and Seth Stepec, bassist, Noal "Dougie" Johnson, and drummer, Winter Montoya.

== Music history ==
The band commenced as a musical entity in 2000. with their first release, Calm Seas Don't Make Sailors, a studio album, that was released on January 1, 2005, from Blood and Ink Records. The group disbanded in late 2005.

== Members ==
Current members

- Sam Dean - vocals
- Alan Isaacson - guitar
- Seth Stepec - guitar
- Nolan "Dougie" Johnson - bass
- Winter Montoya - drums

== Discography ==
Studio albums

- Calm Seas Don't Make Sailors (January 1, 2005, Blood and Ink)
