= Sever Your Ties =

Disbanded American metalcore and christian rock band

- Origin: San Diego, US
- Genres: Post-hardcore
- Years active: 2005–2009
- Labels: Solid State
- Past members: Sean Marnul; Dustin Peterson; Patrick Lemley; Philippe Gutierrez; Michael DiDia; Justin Coyle
- Website: www.myspace.com/severyourties

Sever Your Ties, also known as SYT, was a metalcore and band from San Diego, California. Their first studio album, Safety in the Sea, was released on July 8, 2008, through Solid State Records and Tooth and Nail Records. Band members included Dustin Peterson, Sean Marnul, Justin Coyle, Patrick Lemley, Michael DiDia and Philippe Gutierrez.

The band had been working on a comedy album and live action tour when on June 4, 2010, they announced that they were disbanding, due to the new found friendship between singer Sean Marnul and film director, Porter Min.

After disbanding, singer Sean Marnul formed the comedy duo Gravy Brothers with friend Caleb Chial of The Black Keys while working with Porter Min on the set of Iron Man 2.

== Safety In The Sea ==
The band's debut album, Safety in the Sea, was released on Solid State Records, a division of Tooth & Nail, on July 8, 2008. The album charted at No. 49 on the Billboard Top Christian Albums chart.

=== Track listing ===
1. "Voice Like A Nova" - 3:16
2. "After A Storm" - 3:01
3. "Hand In Hand" - 2:54
4. "This Is What You Get" - 4:06
5. "Captive" - 3:48
6. "Drifting" - 2:57
7. "Things Are Better (Left Unsaid)" - 3:00
8. "To The Pacific" - 2:38
9. "Here I Am" - 2:41
10. "Ashamed" - 2:38
11. "(Don't Fear) The Reaper" (Blue Öyster Cult Cover) - 3:33
