= Venia (hardcore band) =

American Christian hardcore band

- Origin: Minneapolis, Minnesota
- Genres: Christian hardcore, hardcore punk
- Years active: 2006–2012
- Labels: Blood and Ink
- Past members: Chad Urich; Ben Kocinski; John McCully, Jr. Chanse Goetz; Matt Bakken; Ben Beecken; Matt Norris; Mat Roberts
- Website: facebook.com/veniahc/

Venia was an American Christian hardcore band from Minneapolis, Minnesota. The band started making music in 2006 and disbanded in 2012. The band released two studio albums, Convictions in 2008, and Frozen Hands, in 2009, with Blood and Ink Records. Their subsequent release was an extended play, I've Lost All Faith in Myself.

== Background ==
Venia was a Christian hardcore band from Minneapolis, Minnesota, where they were a musical entity from 2006 until their disbandment in 2012. The last known line-up for the band, was vocalist, Chad Urich, guitarists, Ben Kocinski and John McCully, Jr., bassist, Chanse Goetz, and drummer, Matt Bakken, while their former members before this were guitarist, Ben Beecken, and bassist, Matt Norris.

== Music history ==
The band commenced as a musical entity in 2006 with their first release, Frozen Hands, a studio album, that was released on July 14, 2009, from Blood and Ink Records. Their subsequent release, an extended play, was released on November 29, 2010, by Blood and Ink Records.

== Members ==
Last known line-up

- Chad Urich – vocals
- Ben Kocinski – guitar (formerly of Torn)
- John McCully, Jr.- guitar
- Chanse Goetz- Bass
- Matt Bakken – drums

Former members

- Ben Beecken – guitar
- Matt Norris – bass
- Mat Roberts – bass/vocals/keyboard

== Discography ==
Studio albums

- Convictions (2008)
- Frozen Hands (July 17, 2009, Blood and Ink)

EPs

- I've Lost All Faith in Myself (November 29, 2010, Blood and Ink)
