= Lucerin Blue =

Canadian band

- Also known as: Natural Saint (1997-2002)
- Origin: Goderich, Ontario, Canada
- Genres: Christian rock, nu metal, post-grunge, hardcore punk, heavy metal
- Years active: 1997–2005
- Label: Tooth & Nail
- Members: Justin Morgan; Nathan Byle; Paul Rennick; Ryan Turner

Lucerin Blue were a Canadian (Goderich, Ontario) band whose music has been described as Christian rock, post-grunge, nu metal, heavy metal, and hardcore punk. Formed in 1997, they released one studio album, Tales of the Knife in 2003, with Tooth & Nail Records. The band disbanded in 2005.

== Background ==
Lucerin Blue formed in Goderich, Ontario, Canada, during 1997. Their members are lead vocalist and rhythms guitarist, Justin Morgan, lead guitarist and background vocalist, Nathan Byle, bassist and background vocalist, Paul Rennick, and drummer, Ryan Turner.

== Music history ==
The band began their recording careers in 2003, with the studio album, Tales of the Knife, that was released on May 23, 2003, from Tooth & Nail Records.

== Members ==
- Justin Morgan – lead vocals, rhythm guitar
- Nathan Byle – lead guitar, background vocals
- Paul Rennick – bass guitar, background vocals
- Ryan Turner – drums

== Discography ==
Studio Albums

- Tales of the Knife (May 20, 2003, Tooth & Nail)
