= R.A.I.D. (band) =

Indian Metallic hardcore band

- Also known as: Rueban And the Imperium Division
- Origin: Hyderabad, India
- Genres: Metallic hardcore; Hardcore punk; Thrash metal; Crossover thrash; Christian metal
- Years active: 2016–present
- Labels: Independent; Rottweiler Records
- Members: Rueban Issac; Bobbin Jaydev; David Samuel; Amit Cornelius
- Past members: Abishek Allapanda; Sam Jaba; Emmanuel Ojo; Shawn Vivian; Stephen Rahul
- Website: raidhxc.com

R.A.I.D, an abbreviation for Rueban and the Imperium Division, is an Indian metallic hardcore band that originated out of Hyderabad, India.

== History ==
The band would form in 2013 out of Hyderabad, India, known simply as Rueban. The band originally was a solo project for Vocalist Rueban Issac that he created to work on music between working with his other bands. The project recorded an album, titled Indestructible, which was set to release in 2013. In 2016, Rueban would also release a second album, Stronger Than Ever. However, after the two releases, he decided to make the band a full lineup, which led to him putting an ad out for local musicians. Soon thereafter, the band became a six-piece band, consisting of Issac, Abishek Allapanda on guitars, Emmanuel Ojo on guitars, Shawn Vivian on guitars, Stephen Rahul on bass, and Bobbin Jaydev on drums. Rahul and Vivian departed from the band before recording any material, with Ojo taking up bass as well. With this new lineup, the band decided to change the name to R.A.I.D.

The band signed with Rottweiler Records, a record label based out of Fort Wayne, Indiana. Once the band signed with the label, they recorded and released their debut album as R.A.I.D., titled The Strong Survive. Following the band's release of The Strong Survive, Ojo seemingly departed from the band, with the replacement of Sam Jaba taking on Bass. The band would begin to work on their sophomore release, releasing a few singles as EPs, including Unbreakable and Outrage. The album was based around the story of Samson from the Bible. The band released their sophomore album, titled Imperium through Rottweiler Records in 2019. The band released their third studio album titled Defiance through Rottweiler Records in 2022. The album marked a shift in the band's sound incorporating elements of modern metal. The album received positive reviews, and as a result, the band won the prestigious Radio City Freedom Award for "Best Metal Artist" for the album single "Alpha.". Following the release of Defiance, the band departed from their record label, Rottweiler Records and went through another line-up change. The new line-up included David Samuel on Guitars and Amit Cornelius on Bass. In 2024, R.A.I.D released a 6-track EP called "Dominion." Dominion marked a sharp change in the bands sound departing from their old school raw hardcore style to a metallic hardcore/modern metal style. The EP covered topics on suicide awareness and prevention, and is considered to be the band's best offering to date. The EP's single "Death Is Not A Solution (D.I.N.A.S.)" was selected as the 15 best new metal songs for April 2024 by Metal Hammer.

== Style and influence ==
The band has consistently been compared to bands such as Madball and Agnostic Front. The band lists Madball, Agnostic Front, Suicidal Tendencies, Terror, Thrown, Kublai Khan, Knocked Loose and Hatebreed as influences.

== Members ==
Current

- Rueban Issac - Vocals (2016–present)
- Bobbin Jaydev - Drums (2016–present)
- David Samuel - Guitars (2023–present)
- Amit Cornelius - Bass (2023–present)

Former

- Abishek Allapanda - Guitars (2016-2023)
- Sam Jaba - Bass (2018-2023)
- Emmanuel Ojo - Guitars (2016-2018), Bass (2017-2018)
- Shawn Vivian - Guitars (2016-2017)
- Stephen Rahul - Bass (2016-2017)

== Discography ==
Studio albums

- The Strong Survive (2018)
- Imperium (2019)
- Defiance (2022)
- Dominion (2024)

Remix albums

- From The Ashes (Trap Mastery remix album) (2023)

D45s

- Unbreakeable (2019)
- Outrage (2019)

Singles

- "Detonate" (2016)
- "Soul of a Lion" (2018)
- "Outrage" (2019)
- "Unbreakeable" (2019)
- "Blind" (2019)
- "Alpha" (2022)
- "Shattered Beliefs" (2022)
- "Aftermath" (2024)
- "D.I.N.A.S. (Death Is Not A Solution) (2024)

== Awards and nominations ==
- "Radio City Freedom Awards Season 7: Best Metal Artist – ("Alpha") – Winner"
- "The Indian Music Diaries Awards 2023: Best Album Artwork of The Year – ("Defiance") – Nominated"
