= Stars Are Falling =

American hardcore and metal band

- Origin: Sacramento, California
- Genres: metal, emo, hardcore punk, metalcore, screamo
- Years active: 2002–2007
- Label: Blood and Ink
- Website: last.fm/music/Stars+Are+Falling

Stars Are Falling was an American hardcore and metal band, where they primarily play a hardcore punk, metalcore, and screamo styles of music. They come from Sacramento, California. The band started making music in 2002, and disbanded in 2007. Their members were vocalist, Robert Bloomfield, guitarist, Rob Pennock, bassist, Ryan Lester, and drummer, Dan Jackson.

The band, released their self-produced debut album, "How Many Eyes Have Opened" in November 2003. After several US tours, they recorded a split extended play, with Skylines, Blood & Ink Split Series Vol. 1, that came out on June 21, 2005. Their final studio album, The Consequence of Revenge, was released on November 7, 2006, by Blood and Ink Records.
