= Serianna =

American metalcore band

- Origin: Madison, Wisconsin
- Genres: Metalcore, post-hardcore
- Years active: 2006–2013
- Label: Bullet Tooth Records
- Past members: Chris Nutting; Kris Meyer-Ruef; Rocky Morgan; Jimmy McClanahan; Chris Ferraro; James Milbrandt; Lee Milbrandt

Serianna was a metalcore band from Madison, Wisconsin. The band formed in 2006, but disbanded in 2013 after 2 studio albums and additional tours after removing 2 members after the first studio album. Chris Nutting started a new project called Steady/Steady which, instead of Metalcore/Post-hardcore, this new band plays Indie Rock. Guitarist Kris Meyer-Ruef later started playing in a new band called Deadset.. Brothers Lee and James Milbrandt formed the band Versus Me.

== Background ==
Bassist Lee Milbrandt states:"The guitarist Jason Becker had a song called Serrana (you can find really cool videos of it on YouTube.) The name was our take on that name. Jason’s whole story is very inspiring. He faced huge obstacles and never gave up, and is one of the best guitar players I’ve ever seen."

== Music history ==
They commenced their music recording careers in 2006, with their first studio album, Inheritors, that was released by Bullet Tooth Records, on August 23, 2011. Their subsequent studio album, Define Me, was released on August 13, 2013, from Bullet Tooth Records.

== Members ==
=== Final lineup ===
- Chris Nutting - Vocals (Steady/Steady)
- Kris Meyer-Ruef - Guitar (Deadset)
- Rocky Morgan - Guitar
- Jimmy McClanahan - Bass
- Chris Ferraro - Drums

=== Former members ===
- James Milbrandt - Guitar
- Lee Milbrandt - Bass

== Discography ==
- Inheritors (August 23, 2011, Bullet Tooth)
- Define Me (August 13, 2013, Bullet Tooth)
