= Cries Hannah =

American post-hardcore/metalcore band

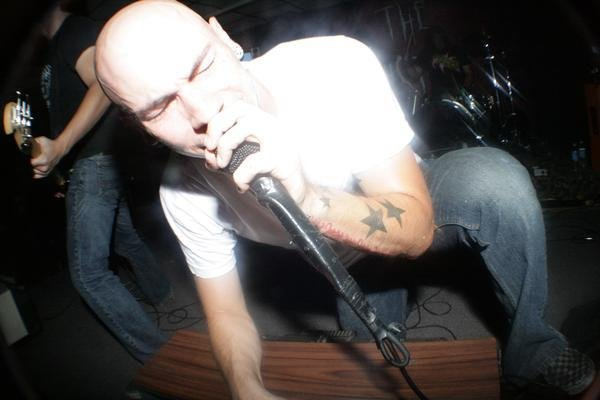
- Cries Hannah in 2007, performing live in Oklahoma City, OK

Background information
- Origin: Poplar Bluff, Missouri
- Genres: post-hardcore, metalcore
- Years active: 2003-2007, 2020-present
- Members: Matthew Tompkins; Trey Davis
- Past members: Jason Savage; Josh Kassinger; Matt Boyd; Jeff Brannon

Cries Hannah is an American post-hardcore band formed in Southeast Missouri in March 2003. The group is known for blending melodic and aggressive elements common to post-hardcore, metalcore, and emo, with emotionally expressive lyrics and dynamic instrumentation. Originally active from 2003 to 2008, the band reunited in 2020 and has since released several independently produced EPs exploring both personal and conceptual themes.

== Formation and Reunion ==
Cries Hannah was formed by a group of musicians who shared a common interest in post-hardcore and metalcore. Drawing influence from bands such as Every Time I Die, Haste the Day, Underoath, and Norma Jean, their sound combined raw vocal delivery, intricate guitar work, and aggressive drumming. Initially performing under various names, the group adopted the name Cries Hannah in 2004, inspired by the biblical story of Hannah from the Book of 1 Samuel. According to the story, Hannah pleads with God for a child and vows to dedicate the child to God's service if her prayer is answered. The band has cited this narrative as representing themes of faith, devotion, sacrifice, and hope; concepts they felt aligned with the emotional tone of their music.

The original lineup included Matt Tompkins, Trey Davis, Matt Boyd, Ross Goins, and Chris Gonzalez. After several lineup changes, the core group during their formative period consisted of Tompkins, Davis, Boyd, and Josh Kassinger. Cries Hannah remained active until February 2008.

In June 2020, during the COVID-19 pandemic, Tompkins, Davis, and Boyd reconnected via Zoom. This led to the exchange of ideas, the creation of new demos, and a renewed interest in collaborative songwriting. Since the reunion, only Matt Tompkins and Trey Davis have remained actively involved in writing and recording.

== Musical Direction and Thematic Evolution ==
Cries Hannah’s music is rooted in the conventions of post-hardcore and metalcore, incorporating emotionally driven lyrics, melodic passages, and heavy instrumentation. Since their reformation, the band has pursued a more conceptual and theatrical approach to songwriting. With the exception of the Songs That Covered Our Youth EP (2022), post-2020 releases have focused on tracks inspired by real-life events, often exploring darker and mysterious narratives. The band has cited influence from acts such as Ice Nine Kills in shaping these theatrical elements, while adapting the style to emphasize realism and emotional depth.

== Live Performances ==
Cries Hannah has shared the stage with several notable acts in the post-hardcore and metalcore scenes, including Maylene and the Sons of Disaster, As Cities Burn, MyChildren MyBride, Jonezetta, War of Ages, Chapter 14, and Job for a Cowboy. The band also toured with Here I Come Falling during their final tour.

They gained regional recognition through performances at venues such as The Jesus Place in Oklahoma City, Oklahoma, and The Well in Poplar Bluff, Missouri. During a tour stop in Lubbock, Texas, the band's van broke down, leading them to stay with a local family for two weeks. During that time, they played several shows in the area to fund repairs. The experience forged a lasting relationship with the local community and resulted in a dedicated following in the region.

== Availability and Media ==
Cries Hannah’s music is available across all major streaming services. The band retains rights to its visual media, including album covers and promotional photos, which are eligible for upload to Wikimedia Commons under appropriate licensing terms.

== Members ==
Current Line-up

- Matthew Tompkins - Vocals (2003-2008; 2020–Present)
- Trey Davis - Guitar (2003-2008; 2020–Present)

Past Members

- Matt Boyd - Drums (2003-2006, 2020)
- Jeff Brannon - Drums (2006-2007)
- Josh Kassinger - Guitar, BG Vocals (2005-2006), Drums (2008)
- Jason Savage - Bass (2006-2008)
- Eric Bieller - Bass (2005-2006)
- Adam Fears - Bass (2004-2005)
- Ross Goins - Bass (2003-2004)
- Christopher Gonzalez - Guitar, BG Vocals (2003-2004)

== Discography ==
Studio albums

- Oh Death, Where is Thy Sting EP (2006)
- Beloved... I Caught You When You Fell (2006) - recorded with Tyler Orr at First Street Studios in Jackson, TN
- Hopeless, the Writer (2019) - a release of unmastered tracks originally recorded in 2007
- The Daydreamer EP (2021)
- Songs that Cover Our Youth EP (2022)
- The Sleepwalker EP (2022)
- The Gloryseeker EP (2023)

All releases since 2019 are independently produced and distributed through major streaming platforms, including Spotify, Apple Music, and Bandcamp.
