= Church Tongue =

American metalcore band

- Origin: Indianapolis, Indiana
- Genres: Metalcore, hardcore punk
- Years active: 2015–present
- Labels: Pure Noise; Delayed Gratification
- Members: Mike Sugars; Nicko Calderon; Chris Sawicki; Jack Sipes; Kyle Spinell

Church Tongue is an American metalcore band that originated in 2015 in Indianapolis, Indiana.

== Background ==
Church Tongue, originally Conquerors, started in 2015.

== Members ==
Current

- Mike Sugars – vocals (Psycho-frame, ex-Vatican)
- Nicko Calderon – guitar (Knocked Loose)
- Chris Sawicki – guitar
- Jack Sipes – bass
- Kyle Spinell – drums

Former Members

- Hayden Darnall - bass

== Discography ==
Studio albums

- Hell is Empty (December 21, 2018; Delayed Gratification Records)

EPs

- The Hubris of Gods Departed (April 2021)
- You’ll Know It Was Me (February 14, 2025; Pure Noise Records)
