= The Gentleman Homicide =

American Christian metal band

- Origin: Amarillo, Texas
- Genres: Christian metal, metalcore, death metal
- Years active: 2003–2007
- Labels: Blood and Ink
- Past members: Josh Barbee; Adam Thron; Max Vinson; Josh Jackson; Matt Jameson

The Gentleman Homicide was an American Christian metal band, primarily playing a metalcore style of music, with death metal breakdowns. They came from Amarillo, Texas. The band started making music in 2003 and disbanded around 2007. The band released a studio album, Understanding the Words We Speak , in 2006, with Blood and Ink Records.

== Background ==
The Gentleman Homicide is a Christian metal band from Amarillo, Texas. Their members are lead vocalist, Josh Barbee, guitarists, Adam Thron and Max Vinson, bassist, Josh Jackson, and drummer, Matt Jameson.

== Music history ==
The band formed in 2003, with their first release, Understanding the World We Speak, a studio album, being released on July 11, 2006 by Blood and Ink Records.

== Members ==
Current members

- Josh Barbee - vocals
- Adam Thron - guitar
- Max Vinson - guitar
- Josh Jackson - bass
- Matt Jameson - drums

== Discography ==
Studio albums

- Understanding the Words We Speak (July 11, 2006, Blood and Ink)
