= 3rd Root =

American metal band

- Origin: San Diego, California, United States
- Genres: Nu metal; Christian metal; Alternative metal; Hardcore punk
- Years active: 1996-2000
- Label: Solid State Records
- Past members: Chili Fields; Chris Baumgardner; Andres Torres; Danny Barragan

3rd Root was an American metal band from San Diego, California, United States.

== History ==
3rd Root formed in 1996. Over the years, the band had some lineup changes, but ultimately settled on, Vocalist Chili Fields, Bassist Chris Baumgardener, Guitarist Andres Torres, and Drummer Daniel Barragan. The band got signed to Solid State Records, a subsidiary of Tooth & Nail Records. The band played shows with bands such as Dogwood, Living Sacrifice, Noise Ratchet and Coal Chamber. The band released the EP Spirit of Life in 2000, at the beginning at the year. The band released an album a few months later via Solid State, titled A Sign of Things to Come.

== Discography ==
Studio albums

- A Sign of Things to Come (2000)

EPs

- Spirit of Life (2000)
