= Your Chance to Die =

American melodic death metal band

- Also known as: YCTD
- Origin: Columbia, South Carolina, U.S.
- Genres: Melodic death metal, technical death metal
- Years active: 2007–present
- Labels: Red Cord, EMP
- Members: Missi Avila; Coca Avila; Thomas White; Ron Dalton
- Past members: Chase Crouch; Jeff Edward; Joshua Crawley; Daniel Todd; Adam Romero; Griff Ellis; Stephen Sanchez; Som Pluijmers
- Website: Your Chance to Die on Facebook

Your Chance to Die is an American melodic death metal band from Columbia, South Carolina, formed in 2007.

== Background ==
The band started in 2007 in Columbia, South Carolina, with the lineup of Missi Avila (vocals) and Coca (guitars), Chase Crouch (guitars) and Daniel Todd (drums). The band signed to Red Cord Records, home to bands such as Phinehas, A Past Unknown, and good friends from North Carolina band Bloodline Severed in 2011. The lineup at that time was Missi, Coca, Crouch, Todd, and bassist Joshua Crawley.

The band released their sophomore album, Suscitatio Somnus in 2011, and third album, The American Dream in 2013. In 2015, the band announced new singer, Simone "Som" Pluijmers on dual lead vocals alongside Missi. In May 2016, the band announced new Guitarist Ron Dalton. After Dalton joined the band, they signed to Dave Ellefson's EMP Label Group. In 2017, the band released their debut EMP release, Ex-Nihilo.

On October 20, 2018, the band posted a picture of the band's lineup, with Pluijmers no longer in the lineup, which was later confirmed by drummer Thomas White, stating that Pluijmers was "just not interested in doing music anymore".

== Members ==
Current

- Missi Avila – vocals (2007–present)
- Coca Avila – guitars (2007–present)
- Ron Dalton – guitars (2016–present)
- Thomas White – drums (2013–present)

Former

- Simone "Som" Pluijmers – vocals (2015–2018) (also in Cerebral Bore)
- Chase Crouch – guitars (2011–2016)
- Adam Romero – guitars (2008–2011)
- Griff Ellis – guitars (2007–2008)
- Joshua Crawley – bass (2007–2012)
- Jeff Edward – bass (2012–2015)
- Stephen Sanchez – bass (2015–2016)
- Daniel Todd – drums (2007–2013)

Touring musicians

- Matthew Morris - drums (2013)

Timeline

== Discography ==
Demos

- Your Chance to Die (2008)

EPs

- Verdict for the Gods (2009)

Studio albums

- Suscitatio Somnus (2011)
- The American Dream (2013)
- Ex-Nihilo (2017)
