= Burden of a Day =

American post-hardcore band

- Also known as: BOAD
- Origin: Sarasota, Florida, U.S.
- Genres: Post-hardcore, metalcore, Christian hardcore
- Years active: 2000–2010
- Labels: Blood & Ink (2005–2007); Rise (2008–2009)

Burden of a Day was an American post-hardcore band from Sarasota, Florida, formed in January 2000. The band was signed to Rise Records and were influenced by bands such as Thrice, The Bled, All That Remains. They played their final show in Sarasota on March 6, 2010. Burden of a Day started as a worship band in church, until they were moved to reach out to people with their music.

Most of the members of Burden of a Day are still together, working on their new, untitled album. These members include Morgan, Terry and Kyle. The upcoming album will be released under a new band name and with a fresh style of music. This band is called Colours and currently have three songs released on YouTube: "The Illusionist", "The Machine", and "The Passenger".

== History ==
The band formed in 2000 and signed to independent label Blood & Ink Records in 2005 for their debut full-length, which followed in 2006. They toured extensively before signing to Rise Records for their 2008 release, Blessed Be Our Ever After.

The group's 2009 release Oneonethousand reached No. 25 on the Billboard Top Christian Albums chart and No. 21 on the Heatseekers chart.

== Musical style ==
Their sound was considered to be more aggressive than most other post-hardcore acts of their time. The group has been compared by critics to Underoath, As I Lay Dying and A Skylit Drive.

== Members ==
Final lineup

- Kyle Tamosaitis – lead vocals (2008–2010)
- Josh Sommers – guitars, backing vocals (2004–2010)
- Mike Sommers – guitars, backing vocals (2007–2010)
- Morgan Alley – drums (2008–2010)
- Terry Clark – bass guitar, backing vocals (2004–2010)

Former members

- Chris Scott – drums (2008)
- Kendall Knepp – lead vocals (2004–2008)
- Jesse Hostetler – drums (2004–2008)
- Bryan Honhart – guitar (2000–2007) – Last original member.

Timeline

== Discography ==
- Pilots & Paper Planes (2006)
- Blessed Be Our Ever After (2008)
- Oneonethousand (2009)

== Music videos ==
- "Remember" (2010)
