= Final Surrender =

Indian Christian metal band

- Origin: Bangalore, Karnataka, India
- Genres: Christian metal; metalcore; progressive metal; folk metal
- Years active: 2007–present
- Label: Rottweiler Records
- Members: Joseph Samuel; Sanjay Kumar; James Stephanes; Eric Gerald; Jared Sandhy
- Website: facebook.com/finalsurrender/

Final Surrender are an Indian Christian metal band, who play metalcore, folk metal and progressive metal music. They started making music together in 2007. They have released two studio albums, Empty Graves (2013), and Nothing But Void (2017) with Rottweiler Records.

== Background ==
The band originated in Bangalore, Karnataka, India, where they formed in 2007. Their current members are vocalist, Joseph Samuel, guitarists, Sanjay Kumar and James Stephanes, bassist, Judah Sandhy, and drummer, Jared Sandhy.

== Music history ==
The band are signed to Rottweiler Records. On 5 November 2013, they released the studio album Empty Graves.

== Members ==
- Joseph Samuel – vocals
- Sanjay Kumar – guitar
- James Stephanes – guitar
- Eric Gerald – bass
- Jared Sandhy – drums

== Discography ==
=== Studio albums ===
- Empty Graves (5 November 2013, Rottweiler)
- Nothing But Void (26 October 2016 [India]/13 January 2017 [Worldwide], Rottweiler)

=== Compilation appearances ===
- The Pack Vol. 1 (2016; Rottweiler)
- Metal From The Dragon (Vol. 2) (2017; The Bearded Dragon Productions)
