= I Am Terrified =

American post-hardcore band

- Also known as: Fixed Til Tuesday, First Servant
- Origin: Birmingham, Alabama, United States
- Genres: Post-hardcore, screamo
- Years active: 2004-2011; 2022–present
- Labels: Mono Vs Stereo, Gotee
- Members: Joel Bailey; Brandon Henderson; Patrick Schefano; Gabe Rosser; Casey Ryan Richardson
- Past members: Jeremy Folse; Matthew Stagner; Logan Freeman; John Ball; Dustin Carter; Devin Smith; Daniel Nelems; Eric Anderton
- Website: I Am Terrified on Facebook

I Am Terrified is an American post-hardcore band originating from Birmingham, Alabama.

The band was signed to Gotee Records and toured to promote their self-titled debut EP, I Am Terrified.

== History ==
The band was formed as Fixed Til Tuesday in Birmingham by guitarist Jeremy Folse, vocalist Patrick Schefano, and drummer Joel Bailey by knowing each other from local schools and churches. Gabe Rosser joined on bass, then swapped to guitar when bassist, Eric Anderton joined around 2004. Influenced both by the sound of church hymns and heavy rock, the five wrote together and released an independent EP, Aww Son.

After much consideration and new thinking, Fixed Til Tuesday changed their name to I Am Terrified around 2006. The name comes straight from the verse in the Bible's Book of Job 23:14-15 which reads, "He carries out His decree against me, and many such plans He still has in store. That is why I am terrified before Him; when I think of all this, I fear Him." As guitarist Jeremy Folse explained they changed the name because they became driven "by the desire to give God straight-up worship, and to show the love of Christ to every kid we can possibly reach".

The band was signed in 2007 to Mono Vs Stereo Records and began work on their debut EP. When Mono Vs Stereo was put on hiatus by its parent company Gotee Records, the band was transferred to Gotee's roster. I Am Terrified was released on July 18, 2008, and then re-released on July 29, 2008.

== Members ==
Current

- Patrick "Paddy" Schefano - vocals
- Brandon Henderson - guitar
- Joel Bailey - drums
- Gabe Rosser – guitar
- Casey Ryan Richardson - pa

Past members

- John Ball – bass guitar
- Logan Freeman – rhythm guitar
- Matthew Stagner - bass guitar
- Dustin Carter – bass guitar
- Jeremy Folse – guitar
- Devin Smith (First Servant, the band's name previous to Fixed Til Tuesday) bass guitar
- Daniel Nelems (Fixed Til Tuesday) – bass guitar
- Eric Anderton – bass guitar
- Mark Lucas – drums

== Discography ==
- Aww Son (as "Fixed Til Tuesday", 2006)
- I Am Terrified (EP, 2008)

== See also ==
- List of Mono Vs Stereo artists
- List of Gotee Records artists
- Music of Alabama
