= Doomsday Hymn =

Brazilian Christian metal band

- Origin: Curitiba, Paraná, Brazil
- Genres: Christian metal; metalcore; death metal; groove metal; thrash metal
- Years active: 2013–present
- Label: Rottweiler
- Members: Gil Lopes; Jader Felippe; Allan Pavani; Guilherme Fuse; Jarlisson Jaty
- Past members: Roney Lopes; Fernando Frogel; Karim Serri; Angelo Torquetto; Renato Ribeiro; João Rafael; Jairo Messias
- Website: https://www.doomsdayhymn.net

Doomsday Hymn is a Brazilian Christian metal band, whose music incorporates metalcore, death metal, groove metal and thrash metal. They started making music together in 2013. They have released one studio album, Mene Tequel Ufarsim (2015), with Rottweiler Records.

== Background ==
The band originated in Curitiba, Paraná, Brazil, where they formed in 2013. Their current members are vocalist, Gil Lopes, guitarists, Karim Serri and Angelo Torquetto, bassist, Allan Pavani, and drummer, Jarlisson Jaty, while their former members were guitarist, Roney Lopes, and bassist, Fernando Frogel.

== Music history ==
The band are signed to Rottweiler Records. On 21 July 2015, they released, the studio album Mene Tequel Ufarsim.

== Members ==
Current members

- Gil Lopes – vocals (2013–present)
- Jader Felippe - guitar

(March 18, 2019 – present)

- Allan Pavani – guitar

(June 27, 2019 – present), bass (2014–2016)

- Guilherme Fuse - bass

(June 11, 2019 – present)

- Jarlisson Jaty – drums (2013–2016), (May 28, 2019-present)

Former members

- Roney Lopes – guitar (2013–2014)
- Fernando Frogel – bass (2013–2014)
- Karim Serri – guitar (May 2013-September 4, 2016)
- Angelo Torquetto – guitar (2014-September 4, 2016)
- Renato Ribeiro – guitar (December 8, 2018 – June 27, 2019)
- João Rafael – bass (December 8, 2018 – May 28, 2019)
- Jairo Messias – drums (December 8, 2018 – May 28, 2019)

Timeline

== Discography ==
Studio albums

- Mene Tequel Ufarsim (21 July 2015, Rottweiler)

EPs

- Doomsday Hymn (2013)

Live Sessions

- 08614/4 #LiveSession (2014)

Singles

- "O Fim" (2018)
- "Sujo/Imundo" (2019)
