= Still Breathing (band) =

American Christian metal band

- Origin: Oklahoma, U.S.
- Genres: Christian metal, Christian rock, metalcore, hardcore
- Years active: 2000–2003
- Label: Solid State
- Members: Dacey; Bob Hensley; John Hensley; Michael Rame
- Website: stillbreathingband.com

Still Breathing was an American Christian metal band, and they primarily played metalcore. They formed in Oklahoma in 2000. (Not to be confused with another band of the same name that is also from Oklahoma and has a lead singer with a similar first name.) The band started making music in 2000, when their membership was Dacey, Bob Hensley, John Hensley and Michael Rame. Their first studio album, September, was released by Solid State Records in April 2002. They disbanded as a group in 2003.

== Members ==
Last known lineup

- Dacey – vocals
- Bob Hensley – guitar, backing vocals
- John Hensley – drums
- Michael Rame – bass

Former

- Art Sunday – bass

== Discography ==
Studio albums

- September (April 23, 2002, Solid State)
