= Forfeit Thee Untrue =

South African Christian metal band

- Origin: Benoni, Gauteng, South Africa
- Genres: Christian metal; metalcore; groove metal; progressive metal; hard rock; death metal
- Years active: 2006–present
- Labels: Rottweiler; Sanctus Gladius
- Members: Craig Palmer; Kenny Smith; Corne van Vuuren
- Past members: Sean Towsen; Gideon Karsten; Eckard van Tonder; Mitch Pearson
- Website: facebook.com/ForfeitTheeUntrue/

Forfeit Thee Untrue, also known as FTU, is a South African Christian metal band who formed in 2006. Remaining a 2-piece band until late 2011, at which point, lead vocalist/guitarist Gideon joined the band. Following their first studio-recorded track, 'Seven', they were offered a record deal by Sanctus Gladius Records, through which they released their debut EP, Blood Soaked Splinter (2013). After their recording contract lapsed with Sanctus Gladius Records they then signed with Rottweiler Records - their second international record label. Most recently, FTU released their debut full-length album, Cremationem Jesus Lacrimam (2016), through Rottweiler Records.

== Background ==
The band originated in Benoni, Gauteng, South Africa, where they formed in 2006, with their current members being co-founder and drummer/percussionist, Craig Palmer, as well as current lead vocalist and guitarist, Kenny Smith, and guitarist, Corne Jansen Van Vuuren. Previous lead vocalist/guitarist, Gideon Karsten, left the band in October 2017, shortly followed by bassist, Eckard van tonder. Mid 2018 then saw guitarist/vocalist, Mitch Pearson, step down from the band. Kenny joined the band officially in early 2018 as the new frontman, whereby he and Craig have been rebuilding the band. Corne Jansen Van Vuuren then joined FTU as the band's new and second guitarist in late 2019.

== Music history ==
Their first release, Blood Soaked Splinter, an extended play, was released on 16 April 2013, by Sanctus Gladius Records. The band are signed to Rottweiler Records, on 1 April 2016, they released, Cremationem Jesus Lacrimam, a studio album. When asked what the translation of Cremationem Jesus Lacrimam was, guitarist Mitch Pearson answered "The Cremation of Jesus' Tears". In 2017, both Karsten and Tonder departed from the band, with the band becoming a duo. In early May 2018, the band introduced a new member to the lineup - Kenny Smith - as the band's new lead vocalist/guitarist. In late 2019, Corne Jansen van Vuuren joined the band on guitars, making FTU the 3-piece band that they remain to date.

== Members ==
Current members

- Kenny Smith – vocals, guitars (2018–present)
- Corne Jansen Van Vuuren – guitars (2019–present)
- Craig Palmer – drums, percussion (2006–present)

Former members

- Sean Towsen – rhythm guitar (2006–2013)
- Gideon Karsten – lead vocals (2012–2017), rhythm guitar (2014–2017), lead guitar (2012), bass (2012–2013)
- Eckard van Tonder – bass (2014–2017)
- Mitch Pearson – guitars (2012–2018), vocals (2014–2018)

Timeline

== Discography ==
Studio albums

- Cremationem Jesus Lacrimam (1 April 2016, Rottweiler)

EPs

- Blood Soaked Splinter (16 April 2013, Sanctus Gladius)

Compilation appearances

- Metal From The Dragon (Vol. 2) (2017; The Bearded Dragon Productions)
