= A Past Unknown =

American Christian metal band

- Origin: Cedar Falls, Iowa
- Genres: Christian metal, metalcore, melodic metalcore
- Years active: 2009–2013
- Label: Red Cord Records
- Past members: Grant Lilly; Nick Powell; Trevor Rozendaal; Dirk Wiese; Jack Van Gent; Adam Aalderks
- Website: facebook.com/apastunknown

A Past Unknown was an American Christian metal band from Cedar Falls, Iowa. They were known for playing a metalcore style with a more melodic metalcore sound. The band started making music in 2009, and their members at the time were lead vocalist, Grant Lilly, guitarists, Nick Powell and Trevor Rozendaal, bassist, Dirk Wiese, and drummer, Adam Aalderks. When Aalderks left the band, Jack Van Gent became the drummer. The band released their first studio album, To Those Perishing, in 2011 with Red Cord Records. Their second studio album, Vainglory, was released by Red Cord Records, in 2012. They disbanded in the middle of 2013.

== Background ==
A Past Unknown was based in Cedar Falls, Iowa. Their members, at its inception, were lead vocalist, Grant Lilly, guitarists, Nick Powell and Trevor Rozendaal, bassist, Dirk Wiese, and drummer, Adam Aalderks. Aalderks left the band, and Jack Van Gent was named his replacement.

== Music history ==
The band commenced as a musical entity in 2009, with their first studio album, To Those Perishing, where it was released by Red Cord Records, on July 13, 2011. Their subsequent studio album, Vainglory, was released on October 9, 2012, with Red Cord Records. The band ceased as a musical entity, in April 2013. Over the years, the members would create new projects, with Nick Powell forming his own project. Vocalist Grant Lilley would go on to form Then It Ends with Dirk Wiese joining alongside former members of Dividing the Masses.

== Members ==
- Grant Lilly – lead vocals
- Nick Powell – guitar
- Trevor Rozendaal – guitar
- Dirk Wiese – bass
- Jack Van Gent – drums (2010–2013)
- Adam Aalderks – drums (2009–2010)

== Discography ==
Albums

- To Those Perishing (July 13, 2011, Red Cord)
- Vainglory (October 9, 2012, Red Cord)
