= Christian hardcore =

Music genre

- Stylistic origins: Hardcore punk; Christian punk; crossover thrash
- Cultural origins: Mid-1980s

Other topics
- Christian alternative rock; Christian metal; Artists

Christian hardcore or Christcore is a subcategory of hardcore punk and metalcore bands which promote Christian belief.

== Stance ==
The method and extent of the promotion of Christianity varies between bands. Christian hardcore bands have often openly stated their beliefs and employ Christian imagery in their lyrics, and may be considered a part of the Christian music industry.

== Community and fans ==
Christian hardcore can serve as an unconventional form of religious community for young people who reject mainstream Christian congregations.

Fans of Christian hardcore music are not exclusively believers in the Christian religion. Owing to innovation in the hardcore movement such as Extol, Nobody Special, Zao, Living Sacrifice, and the hardcore movement in general, the audience has become less exclusive.

== Related genres ==
- Christian punk
- Christian rock
- Christian metal
- Christian alternative rock

== See also ==
- List of Christian hardcore bands

== Magazines and sites ==
- HM
- The Full Armor of God Broadcast
