= List of unblack metal artists =

This is a list of artists described as unblack metal, a genre of music which is musically and stylistically similar to black metal but whose artists profess Christianity and either promote the religion in their lyrics, oppose the Satanism and paganism promoted by black metal, or both.

Note that this list only includes bands described as unblack metal or "Christian black metal". Christian bands that are described only as black metal are not included, but can be found on the list of Christian metal artists and lists of black metal bands.

Band	Country	Formed	Notes
Admonish	Sweden	1994	
Antestor	Norway	1990	
Armageddon Holocaust	Indonesia	1999	
Christageddon	United States	2010	
Crimson Moonlight	Sweden	1997	
Demoniciduth	Switzerland	1998	
Drottnar	Norway	1996	
Elgibbor	Poland	1999	
Frosthardr	Norway	1997	
Frost Like Ashes	United States	2001	
Grave Declaration	Norway	2006	
Horde	Australia	1994	
Hortor	Mexico	2004	
Lengsel	Norway	1995	
O, Majestic Winter	United States	2008	
Sanctifica	Sweden	1996	
Shadows of Paragon	Sweden	2001	
Skald in Veum	Sweden	2013	
Slechtvalk	Netherlands	1997	
Vaakevandring	Norway	1999	
Vardøger	Norway	1994	
Vials of Wrath	United States	2011	

== Bibliography ==
- Moberg, Marcus (2015). Christian Metal: History, Ideology, Scene. Bloomsbury Publishing. ISBN 978-1-47257-986-7.
- Pneuma, Esychia (2014). White Metal: Du bruit pour l'homme en croix (in French). Camion Blanc. ISBN 978-2-35779-499-3.
