= Omen (Antestor album) =

Studio album by Antestor
- Released: November 16, 2012
- Recorded: August 2011 – July 2012
- Studios: Isolation Studio, Norway; Børven Studios, Norway; Salvation Room, Norway; Solid Mix Studios, Teleborg Castle, Växjö, Sweden
- Genres: Unblack metal, blackened death metal, melodic death metal
- Length: 51:03
- Languages: English, Norwegian
- Label: Bombworks
- Producer: Antestor

Antestor chronology
The Forsaken (2005)	Omen (2012)

Omen is the fourth studio album by the Norwegian Christian extreme metal band Antestor, released by Bombworks Records on November 16, 2012. Recording began in 2011, and was mostly conducted at the home of vocalist Ronny Hansen. The album cover is a painting by Polish artist Zdzisław Beksiński, and depicts a deformed, many-fingered humanoid creature playing a trumpet. Antestor met with critical praise for its musicianship and the progressive sound on the recording. Critics described the sound as primarily black metal, though the band prefers the more general term "extreme metal" to describe the sound on Omen.

To promote the album, the band went on tour in Brazil in January 2013, but encountered difficulties. The venue at Belém was cancelled due to a banking error, and while at Belo Horizonte Antestor was stormed by violent protestors antagonistic to the Christian beliefs of the band members, and police had to usher the band to safety. Despite these setbacks, Antestor considered the tour a success, and wished no ill will on its attackers. On February 18, 2013, a music video was released for the song "Unchained".

== Background ==
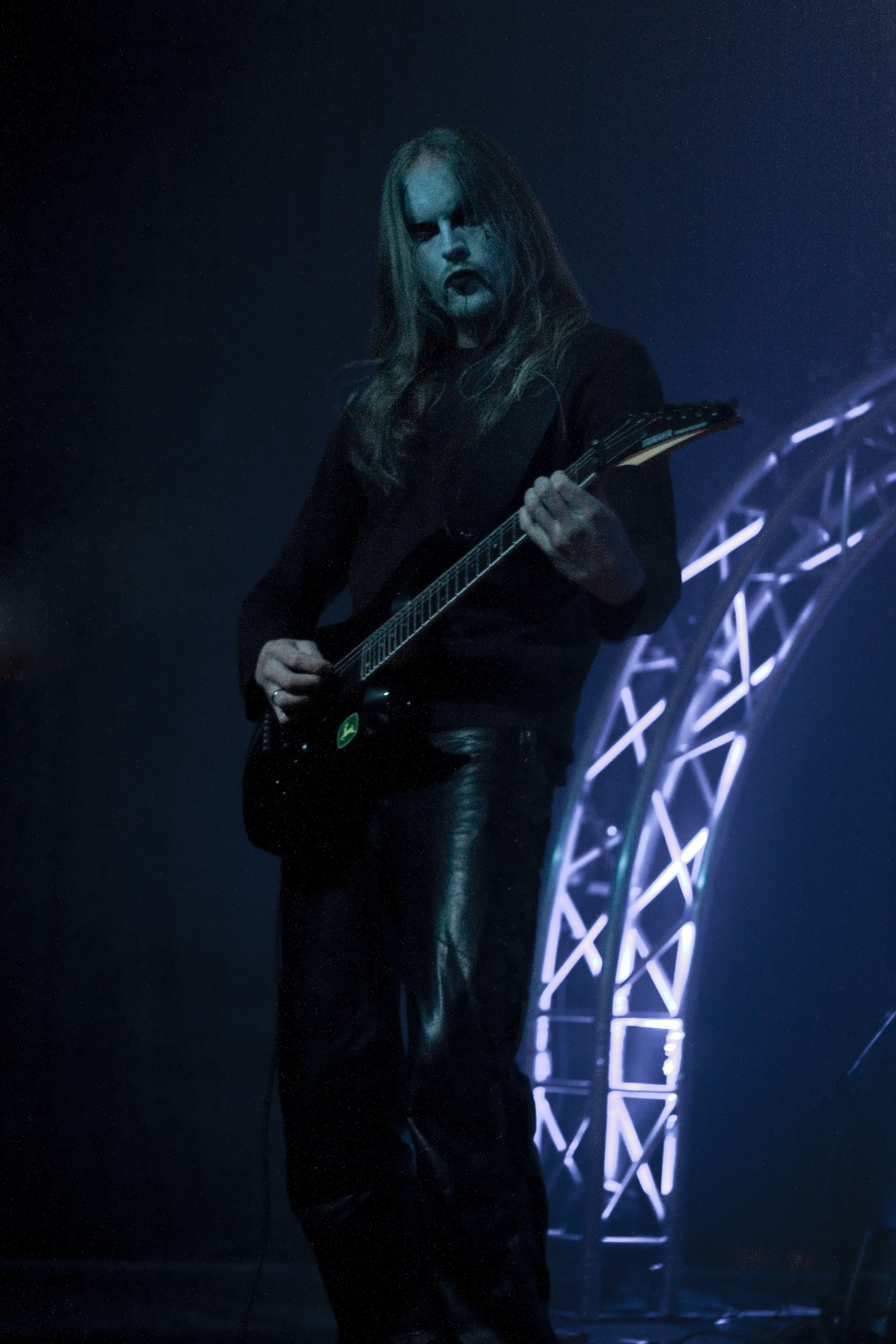
Lars Stokstad, sole remaining founding member of Antestor, seen here in 2011 at Elements of Rock, Uster, Switzerland.

Antestor was founded in 1990 by Lars Stokstad, Kjetil Molnes, Øyvind Hope and Erling Jørgensen, under the name Crush Evil. After recording two demos and undergoing a lineup change which left Stokstad and Molnes as sole founding members, the band renamed itself as Antestor in 1993. Shunned by the early Norwegian black metal scene due to the band members' staunch Christian faith, Antestor struggled retaining a record deal. Its first album, Martyrium, was recorded in 1994 and had a few bootleg copies illegally distributed, but did not see legitimate release until 2000. Antestor's second album, The Return of the Black Death, was released in 1998 through Cacophonous Records, but the band claims that the label never paid Antestor any royalties for that album. In 2004 and 2005, respectively, the band released, under Endtime Productions, the EP Det tapte liv and the studio album The Forsaken, both of which featured session drum work by drummer Jan Axel Blomberg, known as Hellhammer, who has played in strongly anti-Christian bands such as Mayhem and Immortal. Despite a positive reception to the album, after 2007 Antestor consisted only of Stokstad and vocalist Ronny Hansen, and the band went into hiatus.

Several new members joined the band in 2010: Thor Georg Buer on bass, Jo Henning Børven on drums, Robert Bordevik on guitar, and Nickolas Main Henriksen on keyboard. Rehearsals began in June, and Antestor performed at Nordic Fest in Oslo on October 28 through October 30. On November 4, Antestor announced that it signed a record deal with Bombworks Records.

== Recording ==
Except for drums and the folk music instrumental "Tilflukt", the album was entirely recorded at Hansen's home in Norway. Drums were recorded by Børven at his home, while "Tilflukt" was recorded and mixed by Erik Normann Aanonsen and James William Makepeace at Salvation Room studios. In an interview with HM, Antestor explained that it had trouble finding a studio that it liked, as well as finding time when all members were available to record. Since Buer and Børven had the necessary equipment to record, the band decided it would take on recording itself. The band stated that Buer "really took the brunt of the workload and singlehandedly made it possible for us to record the album ourselves." Demo recording began in 2010, and Antestor uploaded a video clip from its recording sessions on September 4. During recording, bassist Thor Georg Buer left Antestor in May 2011 due to commitments to his other band, Grave Declaration, and Aanonsen was recruited as his replacement. A few months later, Buer rejoined, this time on guitar, to replace Robert Bordevik, who had temporarily left the band. On June 23, the Christian music website Indie Vision Music noted a video uploaded by Antestor that contained footage of the band recording. The recording process finished on July 31, 2012. On August 25, Buer announced that he was leaving Antestor again, this time due to upcoming college studies. In September, Erik Tordsson completed the mixing and mastering for Omen at Solid Mix Studios, Teleborg Castle, Växjö, Sweden.

== Music and lyrics ==
The album is primarily black metal in sound, though still retains the thrash metal, doom metal, and folk music influences of previous releases by the band. On Omen, Antestor took a more brutal and experimental approach. Most of the vocals are screamed and growled, except "Unchained", which features a passage with sung vocals, which Andy Synn of No Clean Signing described as having a "strong Pink Floyd feel to them". Synn considered the album as a mixture of the aggressive assault of Dark Funeral with the more technical and atmospheric playing of Dark Fortress. Scott Waters, writing for HM, described the album as "progressive, post-black/extreme metal that paints a dark, sullen landscape with lyrics that offer hope." Victimer, editor-in-chief for the Czech webzine Echoes, described Omen as black metal with influences from thrash metal. Antestor itself does not consider the album black metal, preferring instead the term "extreme metal". It explained to HM that

Black metal is dead. The progressive development has stalled and has lost its edge in the genre. We don’t consider ourselves black metal, but extreme metal. Other people feel that they have a claim on the name and concept of black metal, and we don’t want to keep ourselves within any box or confines. We just want to write the music we like.

— Antestor, Antestor: Taking Care of Unfinished Business

"Treacherous Domain" contains slow, doom-inspired riffing, while "In Solitude," "The Kindling," and "Benighted" feature a more progressive, technical style of black metal. "Tilflukt" is a short folk instrumental which segues into the double-bass drumming of "Benighted". Synn described "Remnants" as developing "a harsh, angular pounding rhythm that would sit well on any Gorgoroth album"; "Tilflukt" as similar to the output of Windir, and "Mørket's Grøde" as containing echoes of early Satyricon.

Apart from the final track, "Mørket's Grøde", and the instrumental, "Tilflukt", all song lyrics are written in English. Zuza Steck of the Polish magazine Musick Magazine noted the "unblack" – Christian – message of the lyrics and how Antestor demonstrates that a band can maintain an extreme atmosphere but take a different lyrical approach. Antestor expounded on the lyrical themes that "at the same time that we are Christians, we are also humans. I think almost everyone can relate to parts of our music and lyrics, for absolutely everyone – Christians and non-believers alike – experience hard and terrible times. The Lord does not say we will not meet hard times as Christians, but that He will be with us and carry us through it, and that is a big part of the Antestor message."

=== Artwork ===
The album features a painting by Polish surrealist artist Zdzisław Beksiński. The painting depicts a deformed, humanoid creature with many fingers, playing a trumpet. The band explained that it decided on this picture because "Our music represents the more broken and monster-like feelings of our humanity, like the apparition in this picture. It seemed a very fitting cover for our return after seven years of silence."

== Promotion and touring ==
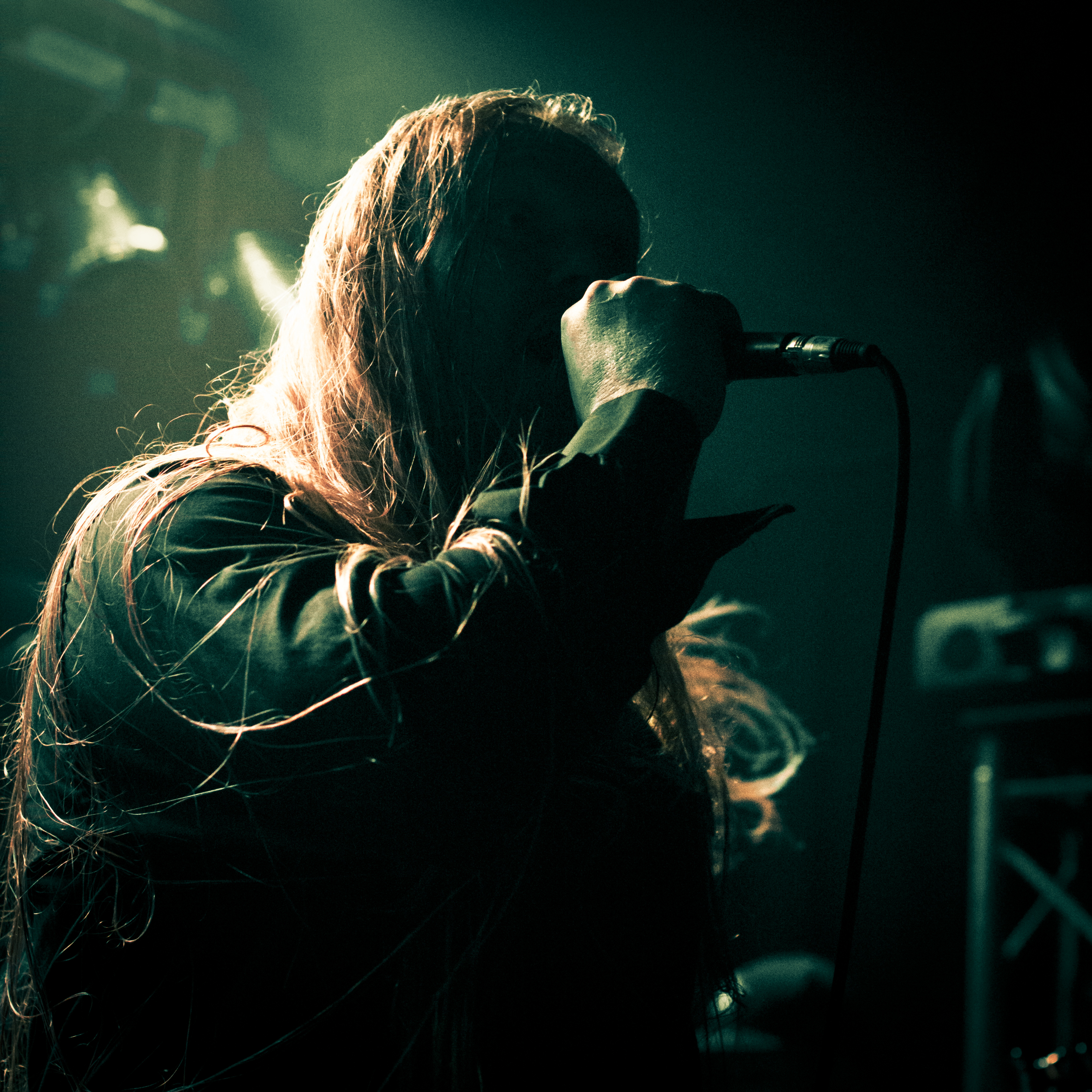
Ronny Hansen of Antestor at Blast of Eternity, Neckarsulm, Germany, 2012

To promote the album, a music video for "Unchained" was released on February 18, 2013. Directed by Alexandre Spiacci, it was the band's first music video. Antestor played numerous concerts during and after the recording of Omen. On March 5, 2011, the band performed at Elements of Rock in Uster, Switzerland. Though this performance was plagued by very poor sound, the band considered it a success. Throughout 2011 and 2012, Antestor performed at several venues in Norway, Netherlands, and Germany. On January 30, 2013, after Antestor's completion of its Brazilian tour, it announced that its keyboardist, Nickolas Main Henriksen, had left the group for health reasons, but that no replacement would be recruited. On June 15, 2013, the band performed in Pieksämäki, Finland.

=== Brazilian tour ===
In January 2013, Antestor embarked on a tour of Brazil to promote the album. Seven venues were scheduled - Jundiaí, São Paulo, Curitiba, Belém, Vitória, Belo Horizonte, and Rio de Janeiro. However, the show at Belém was cancelled due to a banking error which led to the band's plane ticket being revoked.

While Antestor was playing at Belo Horizonte, the venue was mobbed by Satanist black metal fans who protested against the band members' Christian beliefs. The band had received over three hundred threats, including death threats, since its announcement of the tour in October 2012. At Belo Horizonte, approximately one hundred protestors gathered outside the venue, holding up banners, shouting "fuck Antestor!", and threatening kill both the band members and concert attendees. About thirty guards stood outside the venue, but the situation escalated and the protestors tried to storm the building. Brodevik, the guitarist, reported that he and his fellow band members were kicked, beaten, and spat upon by protestors. As the protestors tried to tear down the door, the band waited for police to arrive, and then were escorted outside by two officers who were armed and wearing bulletproof vests. The minibus waiting outside the back door had had its tires punctured, so the band was instead escorted out the main entrance. The police fired warning shots and formed a defensive ring, allowing the band to escape in a waiting taxi.

After the incident, Brodevik described his and the other band member's situation as "trapped like rats." While he said that the band is used to hatred from the extreme metal community toward the Bible and Christianity, nothing like this had ever happened to the band before. Aanonsen, the bassist and a father of three, explained that while he understood that the tour could have ended in death for him and the other band members, when violence finally broke out a Belo Horizonte he remained completely, unexpectedly calm. In retrospect he remarked that while it scared him, the concert in Belo Horizonte was the best he has ever experienced, as all attendees "defied so much" to get to it. He also noted that because of the attack, the band is now "twice as big" in Brazil as it had been before the incident. In a summary of the concert posted on Facebook, Antestor stated that

We could write in details about all the drama that happened after the show. But not on this page. We do not hate the angry mob who came to hurt us. In fact, our message in our shows is to love your enemy. So God bless everybody who stood outside chanting: Fuck Antestor! Hope we can talk like reasonable people someday over a fresh squeezed juice. Extra special hails to our fans who had the balls to come although they knew it could be dangerous. Antestor salutes you and be blessed.

— Antestor, Antestor - Timeline Photo

== Critical reception ==
Professional ratings
Review scores
Source	Rating
Cross Rhythms	9/10 squares
Echoes	75%
Musick Magazine	6.5/10
Untombed	4.5/5 stars

Released on November 16, 2012, Omen was well received by music critics. They highlighted the drumming on the album, remarking on how Børven was able to match the skill and intensity of Blomberg. Steven Ecott of Cross Rhythms praised the drumming, guitar work, and harsh vocals. He concluded that "'Omen' is a breath of fresh air in the rather stale and stuffy room that black metal finds itself resting." Scott Waters of HM wrote that "the musicianship is beyond reproach. To simply play that fast and accurate, even for four-minute spurts, requires more than just talent. It requires skill and endurance. Much of the music on Omen display that skill and endurance and definitely accomplishes what it set out to do."

Victimer, of Echoes, extolled Antestor's expansive, unorthodox approach. Andy Synn of No Clean Singing, after a lengthy, track-by-track review, concluded that "It's clear that Antestor have poured their all into this record, physically and emotionally, learning from their past successes and failures, in order to craft an album of impressive depth and detail, with a volcanic core of molten metal passion."

Eric Strother of the website Untombed stated that "this band is as strong as ever. Omen is highly recommended not only to (un)black metal fans, but also to anyone with a tolerance for extreme vocals who is a fan of well-crafted, creative metal." However, Strother did note that he personally felt that the bass guitar was buried in the mix, and that this detracted from an otherwise near-perfect album. Musick Magazine's Zuza Stecka opined that the album is sure to satisfy the seven-year wait after Antestor's last release and that the skills in recording the album should not be underestimated. Stecka noted, however, that the guitar solos were not that impressive, and at times sounded as though they were forced, recorded only because the band felt obligated to do so.

== Track listing ==
No.	Title	Lyrics	Music	Length
1.	"Treacherous Domain"	Ronny Hansen	Robert Bordevik	5:32
2.	"Unchained"	Hansen	Lars Stokstad	3:56
3.	"In Solitude"	Hansen	Thor Georg Buer, Stokstad	4:33
4.	"The Kindling"	Hansen	Stokstad	5:25
5.	"Remnants"	Hansen	Bordevik	6:00
6.	"All Towers Must Fall"	Erik Normann Aanonsen	Stokstad, Aanonsen	6:47
7.	"Torn Apart"	Hansen, Stokstad	Stokstad	4:18
8.	"Tilflukt"		Aanonsen	3:42
9.	"Benighted"	Hansen, Stokstad	Stokstad, Morten Sigmund Magerøy	4:51
10.	"Mørket's Grøde"	Buer	Stokstad, Buer, Aanonsen	5:59
Total length:				51:03

== Personnel ==
Antestor

- Lars Stokstad – guitars, backing vocals, additional acoustic guitar on "Mørkets Grøde"
- Thor Georg Buer – bass, guitars
- Erik Normann Aanonsen – electric bass, acoustic guitar, double bass, EBow, additional electric guitars on "All Towers Must Fall"
- Nickolas Main Henriksen – keyboard
- Robert Bordevik – lead guitars, backing vocals
- Jo Henning Børven – drums
- Ronny Hansen – vocals

Guest musicians

- Jo Einar Sterten Jansen – Hardanger fiddle
- Morten Sigmund Magerøy – sung vocals on "Benighted"

Production

- Antestor – recording
- Erik Normann Aanonsen – recording and mixing on "Tilflukt"
- James William Makepeace – recording and mixing on "Tilflukt"
- Erik Tordsson – mixing and mastering

Album artwork

- Zdzisław Beksiński – cover art
- Vegar Bakken – design
- In Anett Husom Larsen – band photo
