= Maktesløs =

EP by Frosthardr
- Released: 2004
- Genre: Unblack metal
- Length: 26:14
- Label: Monumentum Scandinavia

Frosthardr chronology
Necrodisaster (2002)	Maktesløs (2004)	Varg (2007)

Professional ratings
Review scores
Source	Rating
Metal Storm	8/10 stars

Maktesløs is the first EP by the Norwegian unblack metal band Frosthardr released in 2004. The EP mixes the rawness of punkish old school black metal and the complicated song structures of progressive black metal. The title track is an industrial music style intro, and the last song "Vandret" is an outro of the same style. The cover art was designed by Samuel Durling, depicting a negative of a black and white graveyard photo, and a logo that contains a crossbow element. Morten Magerøy of Vaakevandring and Antestor fame contributed some keyboards for the EP. Collin of Metal Storm wrote about the album that "This first EP (that's also their first official release ever) proves that contrary to all expectations [that they were just another black metal band from Norway], Frosthardr is one of the most innovative and inventive bands I've heard this year (2005)."

== Track listing ==
1. "Maktesløs" – 0:58
2. "Koma" – 6:05
3. "Death - My Relief" – 8:52
4. "Ravnestrik" – 9:15
5. "Vandret" – 1:04

== Line-up ==
=== Band members ===
- Jokull - guitars, vocals
- Dr. E - guitars, additional vocals, whipcracks on "Ravneskrik"
- Ozol - bass
- Savn - drums

=== Session member ===
- Morten Magerøy - keyboards
