= Den yttersta tiden =

EP by Admonish
- Released: April 11, 2005
- Recorded: 2004
- Genre: Unblack metal
- Length: 17:37
- Label: Independent

Admonish chronology
Den yttersta tiden (2005)	Insnärjd (2007)

Den yttersta tiden is the debut EP by the Christian black metal band Admonish. The EP was recorded in 2004 and the cover art was done by Sean Palomino of Digital Extremist Studios. According to MusicMight.com, the EP was "ironically" released on April 11, 2005 following a release concert at Sweden's Club 666, sharing the stage with Frosthardr and Slechtvalk.

== Track listing ==
1. "Epiphany" - 7:50
2. "Den yttersta tiden" (translation: "The Ultimate Time") - 6:01
3. "Var inte rädd" (translation: "Be Not Afraid") - 3:44

== Line-up ==
- Jonas Karlsson - bass
- Robin Svedman - drums, backing vocals
- Emil Karlsson - guitar
- Martin Norén - vocals
- Emanuel Wärja - vocals, guitar
