= Vaakevandring (EP) =

EP by Vaakevandring
- Released: 2004
- Recorded: 1998 • 2001
- Studio: Oslo • Nannestad, Norway
- Genre: Unblack metal, symphonic black metal, folk metal
- Length: 21:07
- Language: Norwegian • English
- Label: Monumentum Scandinavia
- Producer: Stian Aarstad

Vaakevandring chronology
Demo 98/99 (1999)	Vaakevandring (2004)

Vaakevandring is the debut EP by the Norwegian unblack symphonic black metal band Vaakevandring, released in 2004 through Momentum Scandinavia.

== Recording and production ==
The EP contains three re-mastered songs from the band's 1999 demo plus one additional demo track entitled "To Find Eternal Peace". The first three songs on Vaakevandring were produced in 1998-1999 by Stian Aarstad of Dimmu Borgir. "To Find Eternal Peace" was recorded in 2001 in Nannestad.

== Instrumentation, lyrics, and style ==
Keyboard is a dominant instrument on the EP, and the overall output is a mixture of symphonic, epic, melodic, and technical black metal with folk music influences. The choir on "Og Sorgen Stilnet I Smertens Vann" was described by White Metal as neoclassical. "Fader Vaar" is an adaptation of the Lord's Prayer in Norwegian, and "Og Sorgen Stilnet I Smertens Vann" is also sung in Norwegian. Matt Morrow, writing for HM, compared the style on the EP to that of old Dimmu Borgir and Crimson Moonlight. Dirk Hochenbacher of the youth ministry CrossOver compared the style to Sanctifica, Parakletos, and Dimmu Borgir, this last as to be expected for the producing having been done by a former member of Dimmu Borgir.

== Critical reception ==
Professional ratings
Review scores
Source	Rating
HM	3/5
White Metal	92/100

Matt Morrow rated the album a three out of five. Dirk Hochenbacher felt the EP would be a good listen for any fans of melodic black metal. Valerio Mei of White Metal lamented that the break-up of Vaakevandring was perhaps the most regretful event in Christian extreme metal, though this disappointment was tempered with the knowledge that some of the musicians went on to join Antestor and Frosthardr. Mei praised the high production value of the release and the talent of the performing musicians. They scored the EP ninety-two out of one hundred.

== Track listing ==
1. "Fader Vaar" - 6:39
2. "Some Day" - 4:19
3. "Og Sorgen Stilnet I Smertens Vann" - 6:06
4. "To Find Eternal Peace" - 4:03

== Personnel ==
- Trond Bjørnstad – Bass
- Pål Dæhlen – Drums
- Alexander Nygård – Guitar
- Morten Sigmund Magerøy – Keyboards, guitar, sung vocals
- Ronny Hansen – Lead Vocals
- Stian Aarstad – Engineering and mixing
- Jeff Mortimer – Mastering
