= The Forsaken (album) =

Studio album by Antestor
- Released: January 5, 2005
- Recorded: 2004 Top Room Studios, Oslo
- Genres: Unblack metal, symphonic black metal
- Length: 44:48
- Label: Endtime Productions
- Producers: Børge Finstad, Antestor

Antestor chronology
Det Tapte Liv (2004)	The Forsaken (2005)	Omen (2012)

Professional ratings
Review scores
Source	Rating
Nocturnal Horde	8/10 stars
Lords of Metal	7.5/10 stars
The Whipping Post	10/10 stars
Metal Clube	10/10 stars
Vampire Magazine	(positive)

The Forsaken is the third studio album by the Christian black metal band Antestor, released in 2005 on Endtime Productions. The album features guest appearances of the established metal musicians Jan Axel Blomberg (Hellhammer) and Ann-Mari Edvardsen.

== Recording history ==
The Forsaken was recorded in 2004 at Top Room Studios, which has been used by groups such as Tristania, Borknagar, Mayhem, and Extol. The album was produced by Børge Finstad. Several songs from the recording sessions were dropped from the full-length and were published on an EP titled Det Tapte Liv. The lineup on this recording session featured two former members of the dark metal band Vaakevandring, namely vocalist Ronny Hansen and keyboardist Morten Sigmund Mageroy, as well as the female vocalist Ann-Mari Edvardsen of the gothic metal group The 3rd and the Mortal. Lars Stokstad is the only original Antestor member on this album.

The album is known to feature drumming by Jan Axel Blomberg, also known as Hellhammer, one of the best-known drummers in extreme metal. His appearance on the recordings was somewhat disputed in the metal scene. In an interview with the Russian metal site Metal Library on January 7, 2007, Blomberg says:

To be honest, it [playing for Antestor] was a big 'fuck off!' to them all [Mayhem colleagues and record company]. I will repeat again that I decide what I do and I play not only in black metal groups.

— Jan Axel Blomberg (Hellhammer), Metal Library

The vocalist Ronny Hansen knew Hellhammer personally and asked him to play for the band. The members of Antestor gave Hellhammer the demos for the songs in person, but according to Blomberg, he never met the Antestor members in studio personally because the producer Børge Finstad wanted to work with each musician alone per time to achieve better and more productive results. The band also asked Hellhammer to play live for them, but Blomberg refused. It was not a question about their beliefs, as Hellhammer explains: "In my opinion, black metal today is just music. I will tell you that neither I nor other members of Mayhem never really were against religion or something else. We are primarily interested in music." Antestor vocalist Ronny Hansen commented on Blomberg's appearance:

First of all Jan Axel "Hellhammer" is a total professional. He started up together with the secular scene and worse (laughs) but he doesn't care if it's secular or Christian. He knew from the start what Antestor stands for. And maybe if we get the chance, we are more than willing to use him again. Cause his drumming is outstanding. I think that he is the very best drummer in the scene and we are just very lucky to have borrowed his brilliance.

— Ronny Hansen (Vrede), Jesus Metal

== Overview ==
The Forsaken's reception in media was positive and several critics gave it good reviews. However, some fans of the band's old style were not too happy with the stylistical change on The Forsaken: the previous "sorrow metal" output changed to modern, fast, progressive and melodic dark metal. The album contains several guitar solos. This addition received some criticism, and for example Roel de Haan of the Dutch Lords of Metal webzine wrote that "the elaborate solos simply are not beautiful and [are] completely out of context." Lords of Metal gave The Forsaken 75/100, and Nocturnal Horde gave it 8/10, calling it "a very powerful album," and "an amalgamation of innovation, energy, and anger."

A few songs that were recorded during the same session were left off from the full-length album. These songs include "Grief", "Last Season", "Med Hevede Sverd" and "Det Tapte Liv", which were released as a teaser on an EP titled Det Tapte Liv in 2004. The EP also included the same song that is also on The Forsaken called "Rites of Death". The song was slightly remixed on the album, the main difference is that it includes an intro sang solely by Edvardsen. "Raade" and "Mitt Hjerte" are instrumental pieces.

The lyrics on The Forsaken showcase dark, depressed, introspective and personal themes such as bitterness and longing. On this album, Antestor also deals with issues such as suicide, doubts about the certainty of Salvation, and yearning for death, which is rare for a Christian band. An example of the lyrics of "Betrayed" from the album The Forsaken:

Will suicide break the ring of curse
Or is there just another Hell waiting out there
Will suicide break the ring of curse
Tomorrow I'll be gone, so don't look for me
(Antestor: The Forsaken, song 6: "Betrayed"; Endtime Productions, 2005)

== Track listing ==
1. Rites of Death – 4:14
2. Old Times Cruelty – 3:56
3. Via Dolorosa – 5:09
4. Raade – 3:28
5. The Crown I Carry – 4:52
6. Betrayed – 4:21
7. Vale of Tears – 5:52
8. The Return – 4:47
9. As I Die – 4:51
10. Mitt Hjerte – 3:18

== Personnel ==
Antestor

- Ronny "Vrede" Hanson – vocals
- Lars "Vemod" Stokstad – guitars, vocals
- Vergard "Gard" Undal – bass
- Morten Sigmund "Sygmoon" Mageroy – keyboards

Session

- Jan Axel "Hellhammer" Blomberg – drums (Mayhem)
- Ann-Mari Edvardsen – vocals (The Third and the Mortal)
- Bjørn Loren – guitars

Production

- Børge Finstad – mixing, engineering
- Morten Lund – mastering
- Samuel Durling – executive producer, art direction, design

Artwork

- Kristian "Necrolord" Wåhlin – artwork
