= The Defeat of Satan =

Compilation album by Antestor
- Released: 2003
- Recorded: 1991 and 1993
- Genre: Unblack metal Death/doom; Thrash metal
- Length: 48:47
- Label: Momentum Scandinavia
- Producer: Antestor

Antestor chronology
The Return of the Black Death (1998)	The Defeat of Satan (2003)	Det Tapte Liv (2004)

Professional ratings
Review scores
Source	Rating
Imperiumi	8/10 stars
The Whipping Post	8/10 stars

The Defeat of Satan is an album by the Norwegian band Antestor. The album consists of their first two demos Despair (1993) and The Defeat of Satan (1991). The songs were remastered and remixed in 2003 and was published by the Norwegian label Momentum Scandinavia. The demos on this album are historical since they were one of the few Christian metal releases during the time when the black metal movement was developing significantly and drew media attention with violent actions such as the church burnings.

== Recording history ==
The first part of the album comprises Despair demo's songs. Musically, the Despair songs showcase oppressive and sorrowful death/doom similar to that of than 1994's Martyrium, albeit darker in atmosphere. Despair was released by Strawberry Records and 600 copies were produced. The last song on the demo, "Jesus, Jesus Ver Du Hjå Meg", is a cover of an old Norwegian funeral hymn. Kjetil Molnes' vocals are mostly deep, guttural death growls but he does some depressed clean singing. Apart from the folk influenced intro and the funeral hymn the demo features very few keyboards by Lars Stokstad.

The Defeat of Satan demo was recorded during time when the band was known as Crush Evil. The material differs from their other releases musically: The Defeat of Satan features a minimalistic hybrid of thrash metal and death metal with death growl vocals. The songs clock at over 10 minutes in duration. The demo ends with an industrial music type outro titled "Knus Ondskapen".

The lyrical themes on both demos include forces of evil, warning about them, and spiritual warfare against Satan. These themes opposed the anti-Christian ideology of the early Norwegian black metal scene; the demos were recorded during the time when black metal was developing its second wave. According to the booklet's liner notes, "The history tells of Antestor being the band who started the whole northern European Christian extreme metal scene. About the time the Norwegian Black Metal Inner Circle was rearing its ugly head, Antestor was stirring things up by playing extreme metal that spoke of hope in Jesus Christ and the deception of Satan." According to the write-up, "Antestor received serious death threats from some of the major bands and key players in the scene."

The demo material were remixed and remastered in 2003 and the Norwegian label Momentum Scandinavia printed 999 copies of the album.

== Personnel ==
- Martyr (Kjetil Molnes) – vocals
- Armoth (Svein Sander) – drums
- Gard (Vegard Undal) – bass
- Vemod (Lars Stokstad) – guitar, keyboards
- Bjørn Leren – guitar

== Track listing ==
1. "Preludium" (0:54)
2. "Demonic Seduction" (6:09)
3. "Message from Hell" (3:45)
4. "Lost Generation" (3:24)
5. "Human" (5:03)
6. "Jesus, Jesus Ver Du Hjå Meg" (3:16)
7. "The Defeat of Satan" (9:04)
8. "New Life" (7:37)
9. "Jesus Saves" (8:26)
10. "Knus Ondskapen" (1:03)
