= Demo 98/99 =

Demo album by Vaakevandring
- Released: 1999
- Recorded: 1998–1999
- Genre: Symphonic black metal, unblack metal
- Length: 17:01
- Language: Norwegian • English
- Label: Nordic Mission
- Producer: Stian Aarstad

Vaakevandring chronology
Demo 98/99 (1999)	Vaakevandring (2004)

Demo 98/99 is a demo from the Norwegian symphonic unblack metal band Vaakevandring, released in 1999 through Nordic Mission, a label co-founded by Vaakevandring member Pål Dæhlen. Demo 98/99 was produced by Stian Aarstad, a former keyboardist from the symphonic black metal band Dimmu Borgir. Aaarstad also contributed vocals to the track "Fader Vaar". The band titled the recording as it did to ensure that listeners would not expect a studio quality album. The style of the album was described as symphonic and melodic black metal influenced by Norwegian folk music. The output was considered comparable to that of Sanctifica, Crimson Moonlight, and Dimmu Borgir. Though only a demo recording, the release was very well received and propelled the band into popularity. HM writer Matt Morrow rated the album 9.5 out of 10, and writer Johannes Jonsson gave the album 3 out of 5. The songs from the demo were later re-mastered and re-released with an additional song — "To Find Eternal Peace" — in 2004 as an extended play entitled Vaakevandring, through the label Momentum Scandinavia.

== Track listing ==
No.	Title	Length
1.	"Fader Vaar"	6:40
2.	"Some Day"	4:13
3.	"Og Sorgen Stilnet I Smertens Vann"	6:08
Total length:		17:01

== Personnel ==
- Ronny Hansen - vocals
- Morten Sigmund Magerøy - keyboards, guitar, vocals
- Alexander Nygård - guitar
- Pål Dæhlen - drums
- Trond Bjørnstad - bass, vocals on "Some Day"
- Solveig Maria Magerøy - soprano vocals
- Stian Aarstad - production, vocals on "Fader Vaar"
