= Insnärjd =

EP by Admonish
- Released: February 1, 2007
- Genre: Black metal
- Length: 26:22
- Label: Momentum Scandinavia

Admonish chronology
Den Yttersta Tiden (2005)	Insnärjd (2007)

Insnärjd is the second EP by Christian black metal band Admonish. The album's title translates as "Ensnared" or "Entangled". "A Glimpse" and "Legacy" are classical guitar interludes.

== Track listing ==
1. "Tower of Strength" - 6:02
2. "Istid" - 7:42
3. "A Glimpse" - 2:00
4. "Journey Into Afterlife" - 8:29
5. "Legacy" - 2:27

== Personnel ==
- Martin Norén - vocals
- Emanuel Wärja - guitar, vocals
- Emil Karlsson - guitar
- Jonas Karlsson - bass
- Robin Svedman - drums

Additional musicians

- Johanna Egenaes - female vocals
- Stormvit - keyboards

Production

- Torbjön Weinesjö - mixing
- Jeff Mortimer - mastering
