= Murder Music: A History of Black Metal =

- Written by: Malcolm Dome
- Directed by: David Kenny
- Starring: Abbath; Asbjørn Slettemark; Andy Sneap; Attila Csihar; Clive Jones; Dani Filth; Didrik Søderlind; Hellhammer; Jokull; Jonathan Selzer; Kip Trevor; Mantas; Martin Walkyier; Ozol; René Ackermann; Satyr; Silenoz; Vortex
- Theme music composer: Nigel Champion
- Country of origin: United Kingdom
- Original language: English

Production
- Producers: David Kenny; René Ackermann
- Running time: 64 minutes

Original release
- Network: Rockworld TV
- Release: 13 April 2007

Murder Music: A History of Black Metal is a 2007 heavy metal music documentary aired on British pay-per-view channel Rockworld TV. Murder Music centers around the controversial black metal subgenre. It was written by renowned metal journalist Malcolm Dome and hosted by Rockworld TV's and Contraband Candy's René Ackermann, who was also the documentary's associate producer.

The main themes of Murder Music are: the musical origins of black metal, from Birmingham, UK heavy metal group Black Sabbath to Newcastle extreme metal pioneers Venom; the anti-Christian sentiment of its practitioners; the controversies surrounding the criminal acts (arson and murder) of the early Norwegian scene; and the paradox of a Christian form of black metal, represented by the Norwegian band Frosthardr.

Musicians from some key contemporary bands in the scene are interviewed, such as Astarte, Satyricon, Immortal, Mayhem, Dimmu Borgir and Cradle of Filth. Some non-musicians are interviewed as well, including Terrorizer magazine editor Jonathan Selzer and Didrik Søderlind, co-author of the Lords of Chaos book.

== Background ==
Murder Music host, René Ackermann, became acquainted with the black metal music scene in the late 1990s. She deepened her knowledge of the subject by reading Gavin Baddeley's Lucifer Rising and the aforementioned Lords of Chaos. In 2006, Ackermann teamed up with director and co-producer David Kenny to start shooting the documentary.

Murder Music debuted on Friday the 13th, April 2007, on Sky Channel 368 (aka Rockworld TV). A behind-the-scenes look at the making of the documentary, entitled Murder Music: Backstage, was also shown on the same channel, showing unused footage as well as extended and unseen interviews that missed the final cut.

== Plot summary ==
The documentary links the origins of black metal to the birth of heavy metal itself with the formation of Black Sabbath, known for its early horror-inspired lyrics, it is even said that bassist Geezer Butler, who wrote many of the band's lyrics is to be considered the "godfather of black metal". It quickly moves to the existence of a similarly-named band, which was also often confused for Sabbath, called Black Widow.

Black Widow's stage act was highly controversial, as it was based on a black magic act (it is stated that the band received instruction from Alex Sanders) and featured shocking elements for the time, such as ritual nudity and mock weaponry. In separate interviews, Kip Trevor (vocalist) and Clive Jones (flute), both share their experiences as Black Widow. A contrast between both former members is seen, as Trevor rejects the occult as "teenage curiosity" and moves on to music as business, while Jones embraces it, even having grotesque statues in his lawn, naming a large black fish in his pond after Satan, and giving the interview while wearing pagan-inspired regalia.

Moving on to the 1980s, Jeffrey "Mantas" Dunn, guitarist and founding member of Venom, considered to be the band who coined the term "black metal" in their 1982 album of the same name dispels the notion that his former band's lyrics dealt exclusively with Satanism:

If you look back in the day at the early Venom songs, it never was strictly about the devil... I mean, we had songs about sex, we had songs about drugs. We got songs about serial killers - all that kind of stuff. So basically it was all that sort of dark elements of life, if you like.

Also interviewed is influential thrash metal band Sabbat, who instead of talking straight about Satanism, prefer to explore pre-Christian pagan European religions. Precursors to black metal Bathory and Mercyful Fate are given passing mention.

Host Ackermann notes that music gets progressively more extreme, and then introduces a segment about the Early Norwegian black metal scene, which has given a unique image and reputation to black metal. The spiraling incidents and tensions, such as Mayhem vocalist Dead's suicide, the Church burnings and finally, the murder of Euronymous by Varg Vikernes are mentioned. However, musical experts from the metal scene all agree that the events were highly sensationalized by the media. Tsjuder's drummer Anti-Christian even calls Dead's suicide "a PR stunt".
