= Demoniciduth =

Swiss extreme metal band

- Also known as: Satanicide
- Origin: Switzerland
- Genres: Christian metal; death metal; unblack metal; thrash metal; black metal
- Years active: 1998–present
- Label: Vision of God
- Members: Taanak; Sir Krino; Lord Ekkletus
- Past members: Karkor; Tseror; Ashtaroth-Karnad'm; Annihilith; Nahalal; Kisloth; Genezareth; Nahum; Haroscheth; Hazaël; Lemekh
- Website: Demoniciduth on Facebook

Demoniciduth is a Swiss Christian extreme metal band that formed in 1998.

== Background ==
Demoniciduth formed in October 1998 in Switzerland. The band has had several member changes, minus bassist and vocalist Taanak. The band formed with Taanak and his brother Annihilith. Annihilith departed from the band and hired on several members, Ashtaroth-Karnaïm (vocals), Nahalal (guitars) and Kisloth (drums). The band was originally named Satanicide, but changed names due to an already existing band named Satanicide from the United States. The band then renamed themselves Demonicide. For third and final time, the band switched to their current name, Demoniciduth. The band is bold in their faith with Christian lyrics.The band even included an advisory sticker, stating:

Satanist Advisory: Christian Lyrics

There were several lineup changes during this time, which subsequently forced the band to go on hiatus in March 2002. The band played at Elements of Rock in 2004. The band reunited around 2010, and released an EP in 2011 with a style similar to bands such as Mortification. In 2016, the band announced they had signed to Vision of God Records and would be releasing the album Enemy of Satan. It was released in July 2017.

== Name ==
The band addressed the popular question of what the name means. The band wrote the following on Facebook on 8 February 2017:

Many people always ask us about the meaning of the name Demoniciduth. The band name was inspired by Mark 16:17–18 and basically means "Demon killer" perfect for a #christian #metal #band!

== Members ==
Current

- Taanak - bass, vocals (1998–present)
- Lord Ekkletus - guitars, backing vocals
- Sir Krino - drums

Former

- Karkor - drums
- Tseror - guitars, vocals
- Ashtaroth-Karnaďm - vocals (1999-2002)
- Annihilith - drums (1998)
- Nahalal - guitars (1998-2001)
- Kisloth - guitars, drums (1998-1999)
- Genezareth - drums (1999-2000)
- Nahum - drums (2000-2001)
- Haroscheth - guitars (2000-2002)
- Hazaël - drums, vocals (2001-2004)
- Lemekh - guitars (2002-2004)
- Jéhu - drums (2001)

== Discography ==
Demoniciduth discography
- Studio albums: 1
- EPs: 3
- Demo albums: 1

Studio albums

- Enemy of Satan (2017)

EPs

- Post Tenebras Lux (2001)
- The Valley of the Shadow/Dogs of AntiChrist (2003; Split w/ Sabbatariam)
- The Valley of Decision (2012)

Demos

- Pre-Release (1999)
