= Det tapte liv =

Det Tapte Liv

EP by Antestor
- Released: 2004
- Recorded: 2004 Top Room Studios, Oslo
- Genre: Unblack metal
- Length: 18:39
- Label: Endtime Productions
- Producer: Børge Finstad, Antestor

Antestor chronology
The Defeat of Satan (2003)	Det Tapte Liv (2004)	The Forsaken (2005)

Professional ratings
Review scores
Source	Rating
Imperiumi	9/10 stars
The Whipping Post	9.5/10 stars

Det Tapte Liv is an EP by the Norwegian unblack metal band Antestor, released in 2004 by Endtime Productions.

== Recording ==
The EP contains songs recorded at Antestor's studio sessions in 2004 at Top Room Studios. The band felt that these songs did not fit into the 2005's The Forsaken full-length and were released on this EP. The EP served as a taster for the upcoming album.

Det Tapte Liv includes two actual songs, "Rites of Death" and "Med Hevede Sverd", and three atmospheric piano and keyboard-based instrumental songs. The song structures are progressive and include several tempo changes. Pekka Ryhänen, reviewer of the Finnish metal site Imperiumi.net, gave the EP 9/10 and describes the style as "modern, artistic, and fast dark metal".

At first, Det Tapte Liv was released in a special limited 1,000 copies heavy printer box edition. The box had room for the upcoming full-length. The EP was later released in a regular jewel case with different cover art done by Kristian Wåhlin.

The album cover of Det Tapte Liv shows a painting of the Borgund stave church. The cover of the EP and the album art for The Forsaken together form a single landscape image.

== Line-up ==
- Vrede (a.k.a. Ronny Hansen) – vocals
- Sygmoon (a.k.a. Morten Sigmund Mageroy) – keyboards
- Vemod (a.k.a. Lars Stokstad) – guitar
- Gard (a.k.a. Vegard Undal) – bass
- Hellhammer (a.k.a. Jan Axel Blomberg) – session drums

== Track listing ==
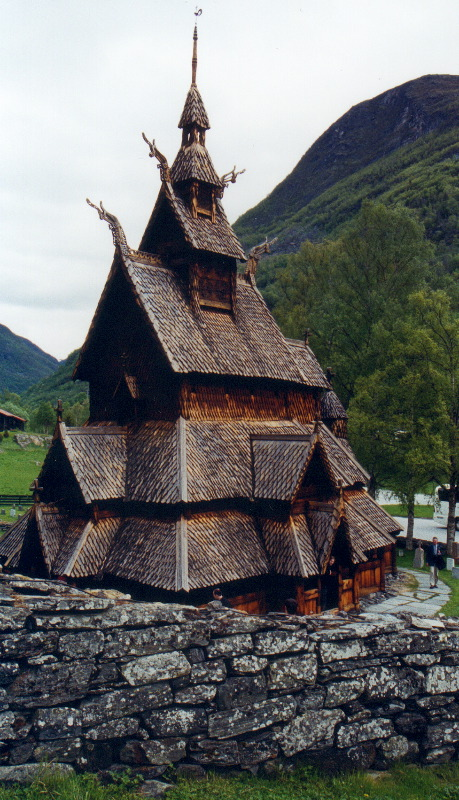
Borgund stave church is depicted in the EP's cover art.

1. "Rites of Death" (3:46)
2. "Grief" (3:32)
3. "Last Season" (3:45)
4. "Med Hevede Sverd" (4:50)
5. "Det Tapte Liv" (2:46)
