= Christageddon =

Unblack metal project

- Origin: California, Pennsylvania, United States
- Genres: Christian metal, black metal, Unblack metal
- Years active: 2010-present
- Label: InChrist Records
- Members: Segør Erskine; Jesse McKinney
- Past members: Zack Plunkett; Richard Aguirre
- Website: Christageddon on Facebook

Christageddon is an unblack metal project, formed by Jesse McKinney of The Synics Awakening.

== History ==
The band formed on October 10, 2010, by Jesse McKinney, most commonly known as Kristian. Kristian hired on Zack Plunkett as the band's vocalist. Plunkett departed and formed his own project, Abated Mass of Flesh in 2011. Kristian hired vocalist Richard Aguirre to join the fold the same year. The band was featured on a compilation, early on, titled The Killing Fields, which was released by Warclub Records. The project began working on a double album, titled Metal Unblack. The double side of the album, was a tribute to Horde, the first unblack metal band. The album released in 2013, receiving great reviews. Aguirre departed from the band in 2015, leaving the band without a vocalist until 2017. Kristian would then hire on Segør Erskine of the band Blood Covenant. The band released a new track titled "I Am Who I Am" with Erskine on vocals. The two are currently working on a new album.

== Members ==
Current

- Segør Erskine – vocals (2017–present) (Blood Covenant)
- Jesse "Kristian" McKinney – guitars, bass, drums, keyboards (The Synics Awakening)

Former

- Zack Plunkett – vocals (2010-2011) (Abated Mass of Flesh)
- Richard Aguirre – vocals (2011-2015) (Demonic Extinction)

== Discography ==
Studio albums

- Metal Unblack (2013)

Compilation appearances

- The Killing Fields (2011, Warclub)
- United We Skate (2015, Thumper Punk/SkyBurnsBlack)
