= Admonish (band) =

Swedish unblack metal band

Background information
- Origin: Stockholm, Sweden
- Genre: Unblack metal
- Years active: 1994–present
- Label: Momentum Scandinavia
- Members: Emanuel Wärja; Robin Svedman; Martin Norén; Jonas Karlsson; Emil Karlsson
- Past members: Per Sundström; Andre; Mattias; Joakim Simonsson; Marcus; Joel; Samuel
- Website: admonish.org

Admonish is a Swedish unblack metal band formed in 1994. They were one of the first bands in the Christian black metal movement and the first Christian black metal group in Sweden. While the band did not release anything until 2005, Metal Hammer called Admonish "One of the leading Christian black metal bands" in a 1990s issue that focused on black metal. In 2006, Admonish achieved some mainstream notice when twins Emil (guitar) and Jonas Karlsson (bass) appeared on the MTV Europe show Pimp My Ride International on 6 October. On that show, their car was modified and the twins advertised their band and Admonish's music was played. Former Admonish member Per Sundberg played guitar in Crimson Moonlight.

== History ==
=== 1990s ===
The band was formed in 1994 by guitarist/vocalist Emanuel and Marcus. In 1995 Samuel joined for keyboard, Mattias joined for bass, and Per for drums. The group was named as Admonish. In 1997 Admonish launched an official website and began to achieve a reputation in the metal underground. They gained notoriety for calling their style "Christian black metal" on their website. This caused some debate in the metal underground and soon an anti-Admonish website was started. While the band did not release anything until 2005, the magazine Metal Hammer called Admonish "One of the leading Christian black metal bands" in a 1990s issue which focused on black metal.

The band was not able to record a demo because of their line up changes: the vocalist Samuel left the band, and after Per moved from drums to guitar, Andre joined the band on drums but soon departed. Emanuel, Per, and Mattias practised with a drum machine. In 1998 Joakim became their keyboard player and Martin joined as the band's vocalist. The band became as sextet when former Obsecration member Robin joined on drums in early 1999. In Summer 1999 Joakim relocated to another city and left the band. Admonish went on a hiatus after the band ended on a situation where they could not focus fully on the band.

=== 2000s ===
Admonish was reactivated in 2002. Per Sundström had moved to the southern Sweden and joined Robin's old Obsecration bandmates in Crimson Moonlight. Mattias had left Admonish as well, but Emanuel, Martin and Robin remained in the band. They were joined by Joel for guitar and in 2003 by a former member of the melodic death metal band Taketh, Jonas, on bass. The band wrote new material, and Admonish was booked to play its first gig after the reunion at a festival called Luccemetal 2003. A few keyboard players played with the band after the reunion, but they could not commit to the band, and eventually Admonish ended up being without a keyboardist. Joel decided to leave the band for personal reasons. A new guitarist, Samuel, was performed with the band in for Luccemetal. After that, Admonish regained its reputation in the Swedish metal scene. After the reunion gig, Jonas's brother Emil, another formed Taketh member, joined for guitar. With this line-up, Admonish entered studio in January 2005. An EP titled Den Yttersta Tiden was released on 11 April 2005 at Club 666 in Stockholm.

On 6 October 2006, the twins Emil and Jonas Karlsson appeared on Pimp My Ride International in which they advertised Admonish and the band's music was played while the show host Lil Jon presented how the twins' Audi 80 was turned into a horror-themed luxury vehicle. Metal Storm commented that their appearance on "MTV's Pimp My Ride program made quite a lasting impression on YouTube and co by growling and headbanging around in their ruined car." In 2007 the band recorded another EP titled Isnärjd, with artwork courtesy of Samuel Durling. The EP was released by the Norwegian label Momentum Scandinavia. The band appeared on a documentary film titled Light in Darkness – Nemesis Divina, which was released early summer in 2008. The documentary focuses on the Scandinavian Christian black metal movement and has been shown on film and music festivals around the world. Admonish performed at Elements of Rock, the biggest Christian metal festival in Europe in 2008.

== Music ==
The recorded music of Admonish leans towards modern black metal with a focus on melodies. The music includes symphonic keyboards, although the instrument is not particularly dominant in the output. Their 2007 EP, Insnärjd, features influences from Celtic music and classical guitar interludes. On their MySpace, they cite Satyricon, Emperor, and Dissection as their influences.

== Reception ==
Because of their beliefs, Admonish has been a subject of controversy in the metal scene. The two members' appearance on Pimp My Ride brought the band more attention. Metal Storm's writer Collin commented the appearance on that MTV show: "As fun as it was to watch, it certainly did not make me want to check out the music these two guys produced. So, Admonish, a joke band needing attention from a crap TV program to worm their way to the sun? Not a second. The 25 or so minutes of "Insnarjd" (their second EP) display quite a lot of skills, ideas and talent to turn a genre that is rather overcrowded and can quite rapidly become a real suckfest, i.e. melodic black metal, into something that sounds at least a little personal."

Metal Review site's gave the EP 4 out of 6 writing "the five numbers on this release are all polished, well-written metal songs with a good balance between the extreme and the accessible," and that "Top musicianship and a crystal clear sound also add to the success of this release."

== Members ==
Current

- Emanuel Wärja – guitar, vocals (1994–present)
- Robin Svedman – drums (1999–present)
- Martin Norén – vocals (1998–present)
- Jonas Karlsson – bass guitar (2003–present)
- Emil Karlsson – guitar (2005–present)

Former

- Samuel – vocals (1994–1998)
- Per Sundström – drums, (1995–1997) guitar (1997–2002) (Crimson Moonlight)
- Andre – drums (1997)
- Mattias – bass guitar (1995–2002)
- Joakim Simonsson – keyboard (1998–1999)
- Marcus – keyboards (1994–1995)
- Joel – guitar (2003–2005)
- Samuel – guitar (2005)

Timeline

== Discography ==
- Den Yttersta Tiden (EP, 2005)
- Insnärjd (EP, 2007)
