= Martyrium (album) =

Studio album by Antestor
- Released: 2000
- Recorded: December 1994 at Norsk Lydskole, Oslo, Norway
- Genre: Death/doom, unblack metal
- Length: 47:04
- Label: Endtime
- Producer: Jon Ove Andersen and Antestor

Antestor chronology
The Return of the Black Death (1998)	Martyrium (2000)	The Defeat of Satan (2003)

Martyrium is a studio album by the Norwegian unblack metal band Antestor; while it was the first album recorded by the band, it was their sophomore release. It is one of the earliest Christian extreme metal albums released in Norway. Recorded in 1994, Martyrium was not immediately released, though bootleg copies of the album were printed in 1997 by Morphine Records. It then gained a cult following among a small audience until it was officially released in the year 2000 by Endtime Productions.

== Recording history ==
Originally, Torodd Fuglesteg, head of the infamous Arctic Serenades label, sent Antestor to studio to record Martyrium. At the time, having problems with signing the band Groms for Arctic Serenades' roster, Fuglesteg said: "I was also in touch with Antestor at that time and I sent them into studio to do their Martyrium album. This album was later released through another label. I regarded, and still regard, Antestor as much darker than Groms, which was a happy-smiles band." Martyrium was recorded at Norsk Lydskole in December 1994, remixed in February 1995, and was produced by Jon Ove Andersen and Antestor. Some problems occurred and in 1997, another label called Morphine Records ended up releasing only 50 bootleg copies of the album. However, tape copies circulated in up to fifth generation copies and their audience grew fast. Michael Bryzak writes in the liner notes of The Defeat of Satan / Despair compilation album (2003) that, although the first album was not officially released until 2000, "Martyrium was rightfully considered a cult classic."

In 1999, Antestor began collaborating with the Swedish label Endtime Productions, and the label released Martyrium the following year. The cover art was changed to a painting by Kristian Wåhlin.

== Overview ==
Professional ratings
Review scores
Source	Rating
HM Magazine	(favorable)
Matt Morrow	95/100

Musically, Martyrium leans toward a combination of death metal, doom metal and black metal. The guitar playing emphasizes on tremolo riffs, and sometimes on slow doom metal riffs; the drumming ranges from down-tempo to mid-paced arrangements. Martyr's (Kjetil Molnes) vocals are mostly guttural, blackened death grunts and sometimes higher growls. Several songs showcase progressive elements: "Depressed" begins with a grand piano solo followed by "orthodoxly sung funeral dirge." "Thoughts" begins with a 2-minute funeral mass organ solo, before the blackened death/doom output turns in. The song "Mercy Lord" showcases operatic, uncredited female vocals and cites the Psalm 51. "Searching" was featured on Cross Rhythms Music's Extreme Music Sampler volume 4 compilation album. "Mercy Lord", "Thoughts", and "Inmost Fear" were also featured on Rowe Production's compilation album Northern Lights: Norwegian Metal Compilation in 1996.

Jamie Lee Rake of HM Magazine wrote of the Endtime Productions re-release of Martyrium, suspecting that the progressive elements of the album made the band unnoticed innovators in the early Norwegian extreme metal scene:

Throughout Martyrium's nine tracks, there are touches of more progressive deathiness: piano and other keyboards, those nearly operatic female vocals, etc. Some of these touches have become nearly commonplace among some of Antestor’s metallic competitors, such as Emperor and their side projects. Might Antestor have been a band of believers who were actually (sit down for this one) innovating in their scene?

== Track listing ==
All songs by Antestor.

1. "Spiritual Disease" – 6:42
2. "Materialistic Lie" – 3:13
3. "Depressed" – 6:43
4. "Searching" – 3:00
5. "Inmost Fear" – 5:38
6. "Under the Sun" – 5:00
7. "Thoughts" – 7:09
8. "Martyrium" – 2:59
9. "Mercy Lord" – 6:40

== Personnel ==
Antestor

- Vegard Undal (Gard) - bass guitar
- Svein Sander (Armoth) - drums
- Kjetil Molnes (Martyr) - vocals
- Lars Stokstad (Vemod) - guitars, keyboards, backing vocals, mixing
- Erling Jorgensen (Pilgrim) - guitars, booklet photography

Additional personnel

- Kristian Wåhlin - cover artwork
- Malling - logo artwork
- Samuel Durling - executive producing
- Göran Finnberg - mastering
- Jon Ove Andersen - producing, engineering
- Tora - additional female vocals
