= Vaakevandring =

Norwegian unblack metal band

- Origin: Nannestad, Norway
- Genres: Unblack metal, symphonic black metal
- Years active: 1996–2007
- Label: Monumentum Scandinavia
- Past members: Ronny Hansen - (vocals); Morten Sigmund Magerøy - (keyboards, guitar, clean vocals); Alexander Nygård - (guitar); Pål Dæhlen - (drums); Trond Bjørnstad - (bass); Solveig Maria Magerøy - (soprano)
- Website: www.vaakevandring.com

Vaakevandring was a Norwegian unblack metal band that was active from 1996 to 2007. The name in Norwegian is a reference to the resurrection of Jesus. Vaakevandring played symphonic black metal with influences from Norwegian folk music.

== History ==
In 1996, Alexander Nygård and Trond Bjørnstad formed a pop band called Lothlorien with Morten Sigmund Magerøy and a local guitar player. Lothlorien's style became heavier and soon changed its name to Inertia. Trond left bass and began to perform death growl vocals and the second guitar player started playing bass.

Lothlorien had some internal problems because of religion. The second guitar player (then new bass player) wanted to write about darker subjects, and eventually left the band. Around the same time Pål and Ronny Hansen invited Magerøy to join them in their project "Signum Crusis". They rehearsed once and then Alexander Nygård became their guitarist. They changed the band name to "Korsferd". Morten played guitar, Ronny played bass and Pål Dæhlen played drums. Hansen concentrated on vocals and Trond became the bass player. By that time the band name was changed to Vaakevandring.

The band achieved notable popularity for its Demo 98/99. It was produced and engineered by Stian Aarstad, the keyboard player of Dimmu Borgir. Next, the band recorded a song entitled "Fall of Man" for Endtime Productions' compilation In the Shadow of Death. Both Hansen and Magerøy joined the notable band Antestor around this time while still were members of Vaakevandring. Pål Dæhlen joined Frosthardr on drums. Vaakevandring's demo was re-released as a self-titled EP by the Norwegian label Momentum Scandinavia. They performed as co-headliners with Antestor at Sweden's Endtime Fest in 2007. Though the band only issued two recordings, it was influential on the unblack metal scene.

== Members ==
Last Known Lineup

- Ronny Hansen - vocals (Antestor, Grave Declaration) (1996-2007)
- Morten Sigmund Magerøy - keyboards, guitar, clean vocals (ex-Antestor, Frosthardr) (1996-2007)
- Alexander Nygård - guitar (1996-2007)
- Pål Dæhlen - drums (ex-Antestor, Frosthardr) (1996-2006)
- Trond Bjørnstad - bass (1996-2007)
- Solveig Maria Magerøy - soprano

Live

- Lars "Vemod" Stokstad - guitar (Antestor) (2007)
- Fionnghuala - soprano (ex-Slechtvalk, ex-Antestor) (2007)

== Discography ==
- Demo 98/99 - (1999)
- "Fall of Man" - appeared in the compilation In the Shadow of Death - A Scandinavian Extreme Music Compilation (2000)
- Vaakevandring - (2004)
