= The Return of the Black Death =

Studio album by Antestor
- Released: September 14, 1998
- Recorded: February 1997 at Studio 5 in Oslo, Norway
- Genre: Unblack metal
- Length: 57:13
- Label: Cacophonous
- Producer: Antestor

Antestor chronology
Kongsblod (1997)	The Return of the Black Death (1998)	Martyrium (2000)

Original cover art
- Kongsblod demo cover. The artwork is taken from Birkebeinerne, a painting by Knud Bergslien.

Professional ratings
Review scores
Source	Rating
Kerrang!	4/5 stars
Terrorizer	4/5 stars
The Whipping Post	10/10 stars

The Return of the Black Death is the second recorded and first released studio album by the Norwegian unblack metal band Antestor. It was released on September 14, 1998. It is the band's only release on the British Cacophonous Records label. This album's working title was Kongsblod. Antestor recorded another album, Martyrium, prior to The Return of the Black Death, in 1994, and while bootleg versions of the recording circulated, this album did not see official release until 2000.

== Recording history ==
In February 1997, Antestor recorded a promo-CD titled Kongsblod at Studio 5, Oslo. The recording and mixing process took approximately 90 hours. At the time, their line up consisted of guitarist/keyboardist Lars Stokstad (Vemod), vocalist/lyricist Kjetil Molnes (Martyr), bass player Vegard Undal and drummer Svein Sander (Armoth). The band sent Kongsblod to record labels in hopes of getting finances to record and mix at a better quality studio. The cover of the demo contains a famous Norwegian painting of skiing Vikings (Birkebeinerne, by Knud Bergslien). One of the biggest exclusively black metal focused British labels, Cacophonous Records, became interested in the band, and a record deal was signed with Antestor. However, Cacophonous simply released Kongsblod after changing the cover to a painting by the American fantasy artist Joe Petagno, and the name was changed to The Return of the Black Death. Scholar Benjamin Bianciotto argues that these changes to the album title and cover art destroyed the "common spirit, iconology, and ideology" linking unblack metal to black metal. The album was released on September 14, 1998.

Afterwards, the incident has caused some debates because it is rare that a Christian black metal band gets signed to a secular label. Previously only Horde's release of Hellig Usvart in 1994 on Nuclear Blast is a similar known case. In December 1998, the drummer Armoth said in an interview with the Art for the Ears webzine that they sent the CD and a short biography for Cacophonous Records and that Cacophonous Records just wanted to sign Antestor because of the music, which was exactly what the band wanted to do. Some time later, in a 2000 interview with the Finnish The Christian Underground Zine issue 4, the fanzine's interviewer asked Antestor: "However, you had a record deal with Cacophonous Records (ex-Cradle of Filth, Bal-Sagoth). What kind of experiences did you get from that?" The band replied: "Pretty bad, actually. I can not say they did anything else than released the album. No money, no royalties, nothing." The interviewer also asked: "Did the record company set any demands concerning your image?" Antestor replied: "Nothing like that. They just said that it is not recommendable for us to announce exactly everywhere that we are a Christian band, and they censored the words 'Lord' and 'Jesus' from our lyrics. We ourselves removed a few texts because we did not want to provoke unnecessarily."

Later, some strong rumors in the metal scene claimed, that Antestor was immediately dropped after Cacophonous found out their conviction. In an interview, Antestor stated that their record deal with Cacophonous was still valid in 2000. They also noted that the record label did not keep contact with the band, and later Antestor began working with Endtime Productions. In the 1998 interview, Svein Sander said that Cacophonous told Antestor that the label had gone bankrupt. Ronny Hansen, who joined Antestor as a vocalist in 2000, questioned the "bankrupt" claim in another interview:

The story with Cacophonous is that they really hate the Christian scene. They want to destroy it. Antestor has not earned a single dime from their album due to the so called 'bankrupt' of Cacophonous. I don't know what Cacophonous is up to, and how they are going to get away with it... The thing about Cacophonous is that Antestor did not tell them that they are Christians. When they saw the lyrics, they realized it and edited out most of the Christianity in them. The lyrics of almost all songs of The Return Of The Black Death is edited and chopped off. I think that Cacophonous did not know until Antestor had a contract.

— Ronny Hansen on the Cacophonous controversy in Art for the Ears webzine, 2000.

== Overview ==
Musically, The Return of the Black Death represents the style the band dubbed "sorrow metal" that combines elements of black metal, viking metal, Norwegian folk, and doom metal, leaving out the previous death metal elements. Vemod's guitar playing is based on the mesmerizing black metal tremolo riffing, the sound production is somewhat thin and raw, and Martyr's vocals are high-pitched shrieking. The album's output is mostly down tempo and is characterized by dark, oppressive, and moody keyboards that give the album an epic Viking feel. The album focuses more on the haunting, cold and hypnotic atmosphere rather than technical playing. Songs such as "Sorg" (Norwegian for "sorrow") include several minutes of folky keyboard ambience that specifically focus on creating atmosphere. "Ancient Prophecy" is an over 8 minute slow, black/doom hybrid song. The album begins with the intro "Vinterferden" that consists of breezing breath of cold winter wind, followed by a folky Viking melody and deep, harsh and oppressive speaking vocals saying something in Norwegian.

Out of all the 11 songs, four are sung in English; the rest are sung in the Norwegian language. The album ends with an outro that contains samples of wind whistling with ominous noises and a man talking very softly in a low Norwegian voice. The lyrics deal with the second outbreak of the Plague epidemic in medieval Norway and the country's subsequent Christianization. Other themes include personal darkness, struggle against the evil within, sorrow, longing for salvation, Vikings, the wrath of God, and death. An example of the lyrics from the song "A Sovereign Fortress" that deals with personal relationship to God:

You Are My Hope, O Lord, My Trust, O Lord, Since Boyhood
From Birth I Have Leaned Upon You
My Protector Since I Left My Mother's Womb

== Reception ==
The album reportedly sold "quite much in the U.S." According to Ronny Hansen (Vrede) in an interview with Intense Radio's Bob Beeman on December 13, 2007, "by various sources, The Return of the Black Death has sold over 10,000 copies and still keeps selling." Overall, The Return of the Black Death was well received by both Christian and non-Christian black metal fans, for example the British metal magazines Kerrang! and Terrorizer both gave the album 4 points out of 5. However, some Scandinavian black metal fans felt that Antestor played music that in their opinion should not be played by Christians and disapproved of the album's lyrical content. Eventually the album brought the band a cult fan following. The drummer Svein Sander said of the album's reception in 1998 on Art for the Ears webzines interview:

They (fans) say it's a good album. Even if the production, the sound, is not so good, you know. It could have been a lot better. It just happened that way. We thought just to go into the studio and record it as a promo-CD or a demo. But Cacophonous just wanted to release it. It was good enough. So, people say different things about the album. Some just like it the way it is. Some say it could have been a lot better if it was a better sound. I agree with that.

— Svein Sander (Armoth) on the album's reception.

In 2010, HM Magazine ranked it number 40 on their Top 100 Christian metal albums of all-time list with Beck stating about the album, "Devastatingly dark, The Return of the Black Death set the standard for Christian black metal."

== Track listing ==
All songs by Antestor. Music composed by Lars Stokstad. Lyrics by Kjetil Molnes.

1. Vinterferden – 1:21
2. A Sovereign Fortress – 4:54
3. Svartedauens Gjenkomst – 4:42
4. Sorg – 6:14
5. The Bridge of Death – 5:31
6. Gamlelandet – 6:14
7. Kilden – Lik En Endelos Elv – 6:23
8. Kongsblod – 5:50
9. Battlefield – 5:59
10. Ancient Prophecy – 8:00
11. Ildnatten – 2:05

== Personnel ==
- Kjetil Molnes (Martyr) - vocals
- Vegard Undal (Gard) - bass
- Lars Stokstad (Vemod) - guitar, keyboards
- Svein Sander (Armoth) - drums
