= Grave Declaration =

Christian black metal band

- Also known as: GD
- Origin: Norway
- Genres: Christian metal, black metal, symphonic metal, death metal, unblack metal
- Years active: 2006–present
- Label: Bombworks
- Members: Thor Georg Buer; Ronny Hansen; Kristian Larsen; Kenneth Mellum; Torkel Rosten
- Past members: Jo Henning Børven; Heidi Rype; Pål Haugland Andersen

Grave Declaration is a Christian black metal band that originated in Norway. The band formed in September 2006 as a solo project of Thor Georg Buer, formerly of Antestor. He later on hired other musicians including his former Antestor bandmates, Ronny Hansen and Jo Henning Børven.

== Discography ==
Studio albums

- When Dying Souls Scream Praise (2013)

EPs

- The Nightshift Worshiper (2008)
