= Antestor =

Norwegian extreme metal band

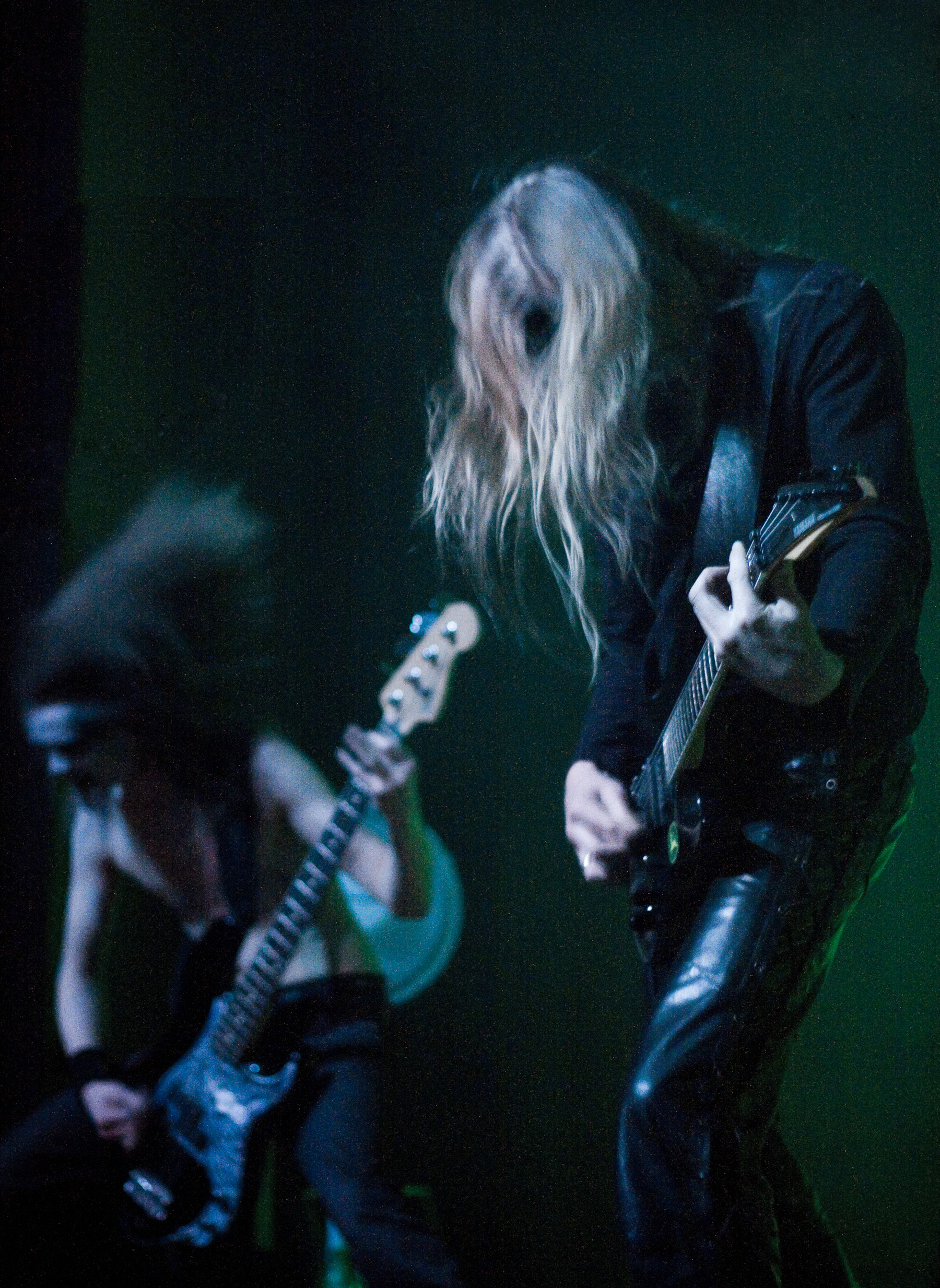
- Thor Georg Buer and Lars Stokstad at Elements of Rock 2011

Background information
- Also known as: Crush Evil
- Origin: Jessheim, Norway
- Genres: Unblack metal; death metal; blackened death metal; death-doom
- Years active: 1989–2007, 2010–present
- Labels: Cacophonous; Endtime; Bombworks; Rowe
- Members: Ronny Hansen; Lars Stokstad; Erik Normann Aanonsen; Henning Børven
- Past members: Robert Bordevick; Morten Sigmund Mageroy; Nicholas Main Henriksen; Thor Georg Buer; Vegard Undal; Tony Kirkemo; Kjetil Molnes; Svein Sander; Erling Jorgensen; Stig Rolfsen; Paul W; Ole Børud

Antestor (Norwegian: [ˈɑ̀ntəstuːɽ]) is a Norwegian Christian extreme metal band formed in 1990 in Jessheim. Credited for starting the northern European Christian black metal scene, Antestor is the only Christian band to have an album released on Cacophonous Records, which has released records by Dimmu Borgir, Sigh, and Cradle of Filth. The band's only release on Cacophonous, The Return of the Black Death, influenced Christian black metal. It has sold over 10,000 copies.

In the late 1990s, they dubbed their style "sorrow metal" because the early Norwegian black metal scene was affiliated with Satanism. According to HM magazine, the progressive elements on the debut album, Martyrium, were ahead of their time in the Norwegian extreme metal scene.

Antestor has gone through several line-up changes, and currently consists of founding guitarist Lars Stokstad (Vemod), vocalist Ronny Hansen (Vrede), bassist Erik Normann Aanonsen, guitarist Robert Bordevick, and drummer Henning Børven. Original vocalist Kjetil Molnes (Martyr) and drummer Svein Sander (Armoth) left the band around 2000, and the members of Vaakevandring joined Antestor. Jan Axel Blomberg (Hellhammer) played session drums on their 2005 album The Forsaken and the Det tapte liv EP. A fourth studio album, Omen, was released in 2012.

== History ==
=== Crush Evil era ===
Lars Stokstad, Kjetil Molnes, Øyvind Hope, and Erling Jørgensen formed the band in 1990 as Crush Evil in Jessheim, Norway. Drummer Paul W joined later. The band played a mix of death, doom, and thrash metal. In 1991, they recorded and released their first demo, The Defeat of Satan, which contains three songs and an outro. The band is Christian and have received death threats because of this.

The band caused a debate in the metal underground. During the early 1990s, Bård Faust of Emperor discussed the subject with Euronymous, guitarist/vocalist from black metal band Mayhem, in his zine, Orcustus. Faust asked, "Don't you think that something is terribly wrong when it has gone so far that we have a Christian "death metal" band here (Crush Evil)? Any advice on how we should kill them?" Euronymous replied, "It's bad enough to have a couple of society bands, but a Christian band is too much. But don't worry, we have plans. They will not continue for a very long time." The band persevered and even employed Mayhem drummer [Jan Axel Blomberg, better known as Hellhammer, as a session musician on their latest two releases.

=== Martyrium (1993–1996) ===
"Depressed"
29-second sample of "Depressed" by Antestor, from Martyrium (1994). The song represents the band's early death/doom sound with some black metal elements.

In 1993, bassist Vegard Undal joined the band and Svein Sander became their drummer. During that time, they changed the name Crush Evil to Antestor, which is Latin (pronounced [anˈtɛstɔr]) for "to call to witness" or "testify". Despair was their first self-released demo under the name Antestor. The demo starts with an intro and ends with a cover of an old Norwegian hymn, called Jesus, Jesus, Ver Du Hjå Meg ("Jesus, Jesus, Be With Me"). Strawberry Records pressed 600 copies of the recording.

In December 1994, Antestor recorded their first full-length album, Martyrium. Arctic Serenades Records was supposed to release it, but because of unknown reasons, that never happened, and the band tried to get another label to release the album. Morphine Records distributed bootleg copies of the album in 1997. In an interview, drummer Armoth said, "...we were in contact with a label called Morphine Records. But that was about signing a deal for the Martyrium album. But we never signed a contract but that guy, Burrito, made several promotapes and sold every bit of it illegally 'cause he didn't have a contract." The tape circulated in up to fifth generation copies, and their audience grew. Martyrium was the band's last death/doom album.

On June 3, 1994, Antestor appeared on a program called "BootlegTV", where youth could practice and experience recording and video production. Local Oslo bands from played on that program, which was broadcast on TVNorge. During the program, Antestor played five songs from Martyrium. On June 6, 1995, Antestor was featured on Norwegian newspaper Morgenbladet's article about the black metal parody controversy of Australian unblack metal group Horde's 1994 album, Hellig Usvart. In the article, vocalist Kjetil Molnes explained whether a Christian band can play black metal: "We identify ourselves as black metal as a music style, not black metal as an ideology or belief."

=== The Return of the Black Death (1997–1998) ===
"A Sovereign Fortress"
Sample of "A Sovereign Fortress" by Antestor, from The Return of the Black Death (1998). The song illustrates Antestor's "sorrow metal" style, which is a mixture of black metal and doom metal with folk influences.

In 1997, Antestor recorded the promotional CD Kongsblod, which caught the interest of British Cacophonous Records, a label that had helped established groups such as Cradle of Filth and Dimmu Borgir start their career. Cacophonous signed Antestor to a two-album deal. In 1998, Cacophonous released Kongsblod as The Return of the Black Death, and changed the original cover art of a Norwegian painting to artwork by Joe Petagno, an American heavy metal cover art creator.

A secular label releasing material by a Christian band generated some interest in the metal scene. In an interview with Art for the Ears Webzine, published on December 12, 1998, Armoth said, "We sent the CD and a short biography. They just wanted to sign us because of the music. And that's exactly what we wanted to do." Two years later, in a 2000 interview with Finnish The Christian Underground Zine issue 4, the interviewer asked Antestor, "However, you had a record deal with Cacophonous Records (ex-Cradle of Filth, Bal-Sagoth). What kind of experiences did you get from that?" The band replied, "Pretty bad, actually. I can not say they did anything else than released the album. No money, no royalties, nothing." The interviewer asked, "Did the record company set any demands concerning your image?" Antestor replied, "Nothing like that. They just said that it is not recommendable for us to proclaim exactly everywhere that we are a Christian band, and they censored the words 'Lord' and 'Jesus' from our lyrics. We ourselves removed a few texts because we did not want to provoke unnecessarily."

The Return of the Black Death was well received by Christian and non-Christian black metal fans and critics. British metal magazines Kerrang! and Terrorizer gave the album 4 points out of 5. The Return of the Black Death is a mix of black and doom metal. The album relies on atmosphere and showcases influences from Norwegian folk music, which led some to label Antestor as Viking metal. Around this time, the band said they felt uncertain whether a Christian band could play black metal, because the movement was still associated with Satanism. Drummer Svein Sander said in the 1998 interview,

We don't even call our music black metal... We call it Atmospheric Sorrow Metal. Because that's more neutral. Then people wouldn't say, "oh, you play black metal, you are Satanists". There really is a sorrow sound, sad sound, in our music. And it's kinda cold, winterly, Nordic in a way.

— Drummer Svein Sander of Antestor in an interview with Art for the Ears webzine, 1998.

=== The Forsaken (2000–2009) ===
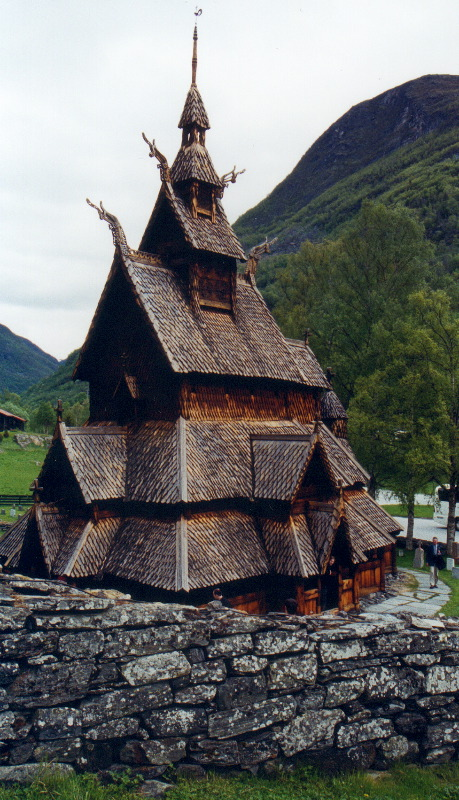
Borgund Stave Church is depicted in the Det tapte liv (2004) EP's cover art.

"Rites of Death"
27-second sample of "Rites of Death" by Antestor, from The Forsaken (2005). The sample showcases the group's more modern, faster and more melodic sound with advanced production.

In 2000, Antestor signed with Endtime Productions, which had helped start the career of Extol. Original vocalist Kjetil Molnes (Martyr) left Antestor. The breakup of Vaakevandring led to several former Vaakevandring members joining Antestor. Ronny Hansen, adopting the moniker Vrede, became Antestor's new vocalist, and Morten Sigmund Mageroy (known in Antestor as Sygmoon) stepped in as keyboardist. Ann-Mari Edvardsen, who has sung in Norwegian gothic metal group The Third and the Mortal, joined the band as a female vocalist. For the first time in their career, Antestor used corpse paint on their live shows.

In 2000, Endtime Productions released Martyrium with cover art by artist Kristian Wåhlin. Antestor toured the United States with Extol that year, playing small venues and performing at Cornerstone Festival. Over the next several years, the band remained somewhat quiet. They did not release any more albums until 2003, when they re-released their two earliest demos on one CD, The Defeat of Satan. Drummer Svein Sander left the band during this time, and Antestor would not find a new full-time drummer for several years.

In 2004, Antestor changed their style to modern black metal, and released their first new songs since The Return of the Black Death in the EP Det tapte liv ("The Lost Life"). Det tapte liv focused less on black metal and more on instrumental songs. It hinted at their 2005 full-length, The Forsaken. The cover arts for both releases were done by Kristian Wåhlin, and the cover for the EP depicts the Borgund Stave Church. Hellhammer played drums on both releases. In an interview with Russian metal site Metal Library on January 7, 2007, Blomberg was asked what his Mayhem colleagues and record company thought about his participation in Antestor, and he said, "To be honest, it was a big 'fuck off!' to them all. I will repeat again that I decide what I do and I play not only in black metal groups." The band asked Hellhammer to play live for them, but Blomberg refused. Hellhammer stated, "In my opinion, black metal today is just music. I will tell you that neither I nor other [current] members of Mayhem never really were against religion or something else. We are primarily interested in music." Ronny Hansen commented on Blomberg's appearance,

First of all Jan Axel "Hellhammer" is a total professional. He started up together with the secular scene and worse (laughs) but he doesn't care if it's secular or Christian. He knew from the start what Antestor stands for. And maybe if we get the chance, we are more than willing to use him again. Cause his drumming is outstanding. I think that he is the very best drummer in the scene and we are just very lucky to have borrowed his brilliance.

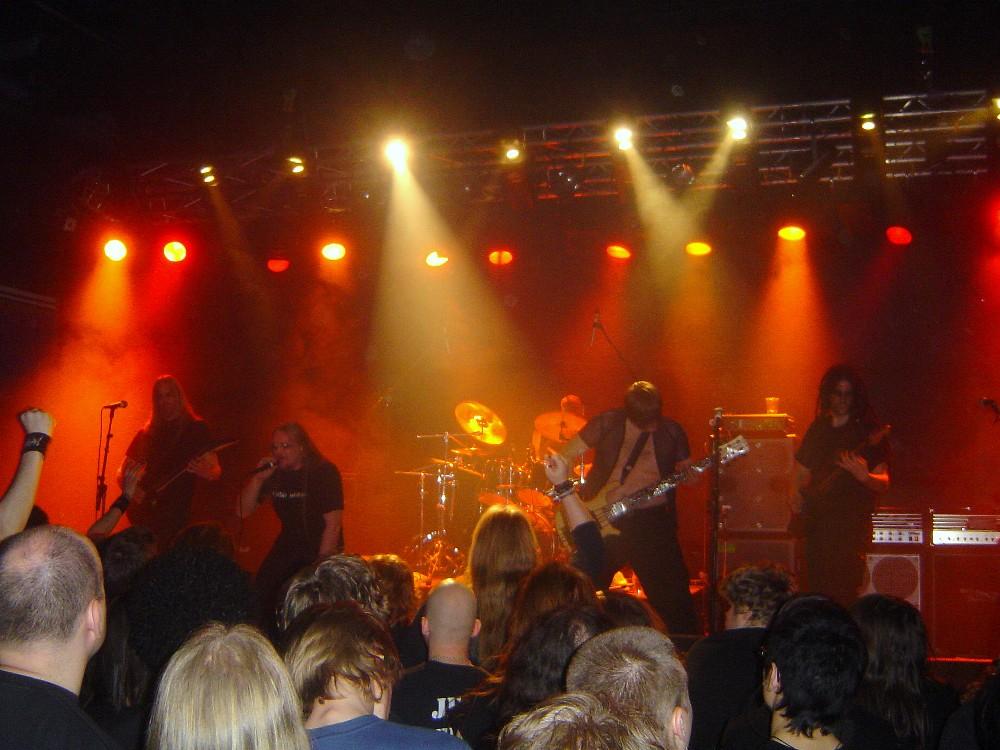
Antestor at Endtime Festival 2007.

Live session drummer Tony Kirkemo joined the band later in 2005. The band rarely played live shows and only at Christian music festivals. Examples of performances the group made in 2000s include the concerts at Bobfest in 2000 in Stockholm and 2004 in Linköping, and at the Nordic Fest 2004 in Oslo.

Some members still play in Vaakevandring, who played a reunion concert in 2007 with Antestor at the Endtime Festival in March 2007 in Halmstad. Antestor performed with numerous session musicians. The band announced that concert was their last live show for a while.

=== Omen (2010–present) ===
After a three-year hiatus, the band launched an official Facebook page on January 29, 2010. They announced new members bassist Thor Georg Buer (Grave Declaration), guitarist Robert Bordevik (Grievance, Vardøger), drummer Jo Henning Børven (Grave Declaration, Morgenroede), and keyboardist Nickolas Main Henriksen (Aspera, Desdemon). This line-up played at Nordic Fest 2010 in Oslo. On November 4, 2010, they signed to Bombworks Records to record a new album and an EP. After line-up changes in mid-2011, bassist Erik Normann Aanonsen (Moddi) joined the band while Thor Georg switched to guitar, and they played the Norwegian Seaside Festival with that line-up. The album was recorded and mixed and mastered in Sweden. Guitarist Thor left the band to focus on college, but stated he might return. The fourth album, Omen, was released on November 30, 2012. A Brazilian tour was announced for early 2013. During the Belo Horizonte leg of this tour, the band faced a protest by Black Metal/Anti-Christianity radicals. Since the radicals announced their intentions on the Internet, the local police had assigned one private policeman in addition to the 30 security guards present to help guaranteeing the security of the show. At one point, the officer had to fire some shots towards the sky to control the rioters. A video posted on YouTube shows a group of radicals screaming "Fuck you, Antestor!" outside the venue and the local police escorting the band members.

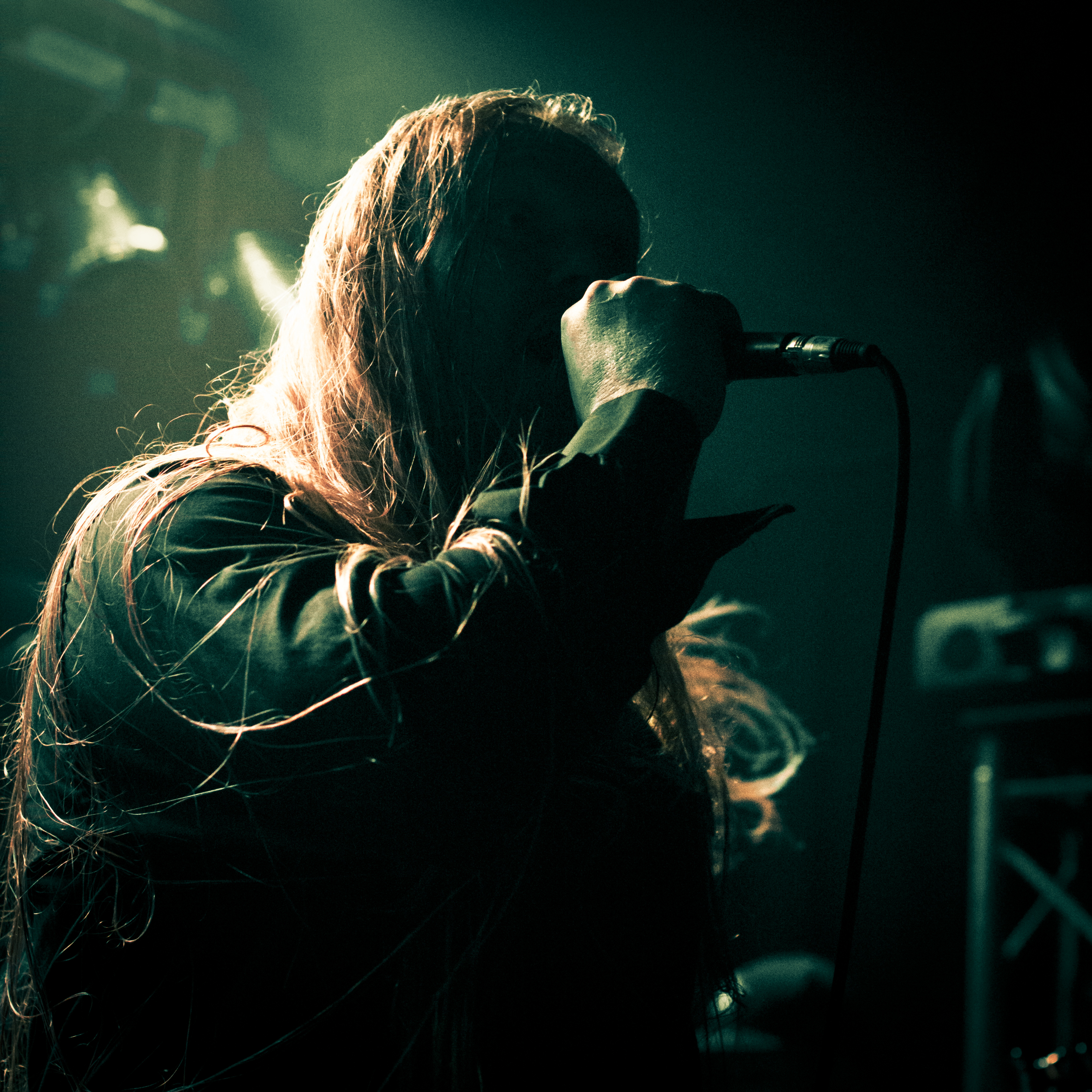
Ronny Hansen at Blast of Eternity, Neckarsulm, Germany, 2012

After the show, the band posted a public statement about the incident, thanking their fans for coming despite the risks, and blessing the radicals: "We are proud to call you our brothers and sisters in Christ. Last but not least we must thank the gig securety and the Belo Horizonte police for escorting us though the angry mob. [...] We do not hate the angry mob who came to hurt us. In fact, our message in our shows is to love your enemy. So God bless everybody who stood outside chanting: Fuck Antestor! Hope we can talk like reasonable people someday over a fresh squeezed juice. Extra special hails to our fans who had the balls to come although they knew it could be dangerous. Antestor salutes you and be blessed." In an interview with Norwegian Christian newspaper Dagen two days following the band's return to Norway, bassist Erik Normann Aanonsen said that he was ready for the worst-case scenario that the tour could end in death, and he reiterated the band's gratitude to the Brazilian Satanists, stating, "We're now twice as big in Brazil as we were before we went there."

On April 12, 2015, guitarist Robert Bordevik announced his departure from the band.

== Style ==
=== Music ===
While the band's style on the first releases was primarily death/doom with slow songs and death growl singing, the band began playing black metal on the 1998 album The Return of the Black Death. On that album, the band showcased screaming vocals, tremolo guitar riffs and drum passages with increased speed typical of black metal. Keyboard is also in a central role, which for the typical black metal style is used to perform epic interludes and dominates the soundscapes. For example, over the first three minutes of the song "Sorg", only the keyboard melody leads the performance.

With the third album The Forsaken the band developed more in the direction of a more technical style, as it is apparent on the style of The Return of the Black Death. The band's musical development resulted in that The Forsaken includes several guitar solos. Also the quality of production compared to The Return of the Black Death improved. Through the introduction of the two ex-members of Vaakevandring, the style became more melodic and atmospheric.

=== Lyrics ===
Antestor's lyrical themes include hope and despair, but also deal with the personal Christian faith of the band members. Therefore, many metal fans oppose classifying Antestor's style to the category of black metal, as their lyrics are often contrary to the ideology of black metal. The lyrics are mostly in English. Norwegian texts are also rare for the group, but on the album The Return of the Black Death the Norwegian language dominates the lyrics. On this album, only part of the lyrics are listed in the booklet; words directly referring to Jesus Christ and God were omitted. The song "A Sovereign Fortress" dealt with, for example, the acknowledgments of God who protects and supports the lyrical “I” since birth. It is portrayed in the chorus of this song as:

You Are My Hope, O Lord, My Trust, O Lord, Since Boyhood
From Birth I Have Leaned Upon You
My Protector Since I Left My Mother's Womb
(Antestor: The Return of the Black Death, song 2: "A Sovereign Fortress"; Cacophonous Records, 1998)

"Sorg" (Norwegian for: grief, sorrow, sadness), however, deals with the themes of the sorrow and the search for hope, with the song based on darker imagery, and the lyrics are not explicitly Christian yet are not negative in the end. An example (in the Norwegian language):

Hvordan Skal Jeg Kunne Leve
Min Sjel Så Høyt Forhatt
Sorg Er Hva Jeg Føler
Alt Så Ensomt Og Forlatt
(Antestor: The Return of the Black Death, song 4: "Sorg"; Cacophonous, 1998)

How Should I Live
My Soul So Highly Hated
Sorrow Is What I Feel
Everything Is So Deserted And Abandoned
(free translation)

Another song that is also a dark, but this takes on Christian theme, is "Ancient Prophecy". The lyrics tells that the man was sinful, and no one can escape the court of God. Antestor process in their lyrics also topics such as suicide, doubts about the certainty of salvation, and longing death, all of which are rare themes for a Christian band, however common to several subdivisions of Black metal, such as DSBM. An example from the text "Betrayed" from the album The Forsaken:

Will Suicide Break The Ring of Curse
Or Is There Just Another Hell Waiting Out There
Will Suicide Break The Ring of Curse
Tomorrow I'll Be Gone, So Don't Look For Me
(Antestor: The Forsaken, song 6: "Betrayed"; Endtime Productions, 2005)

=== Appearance ===
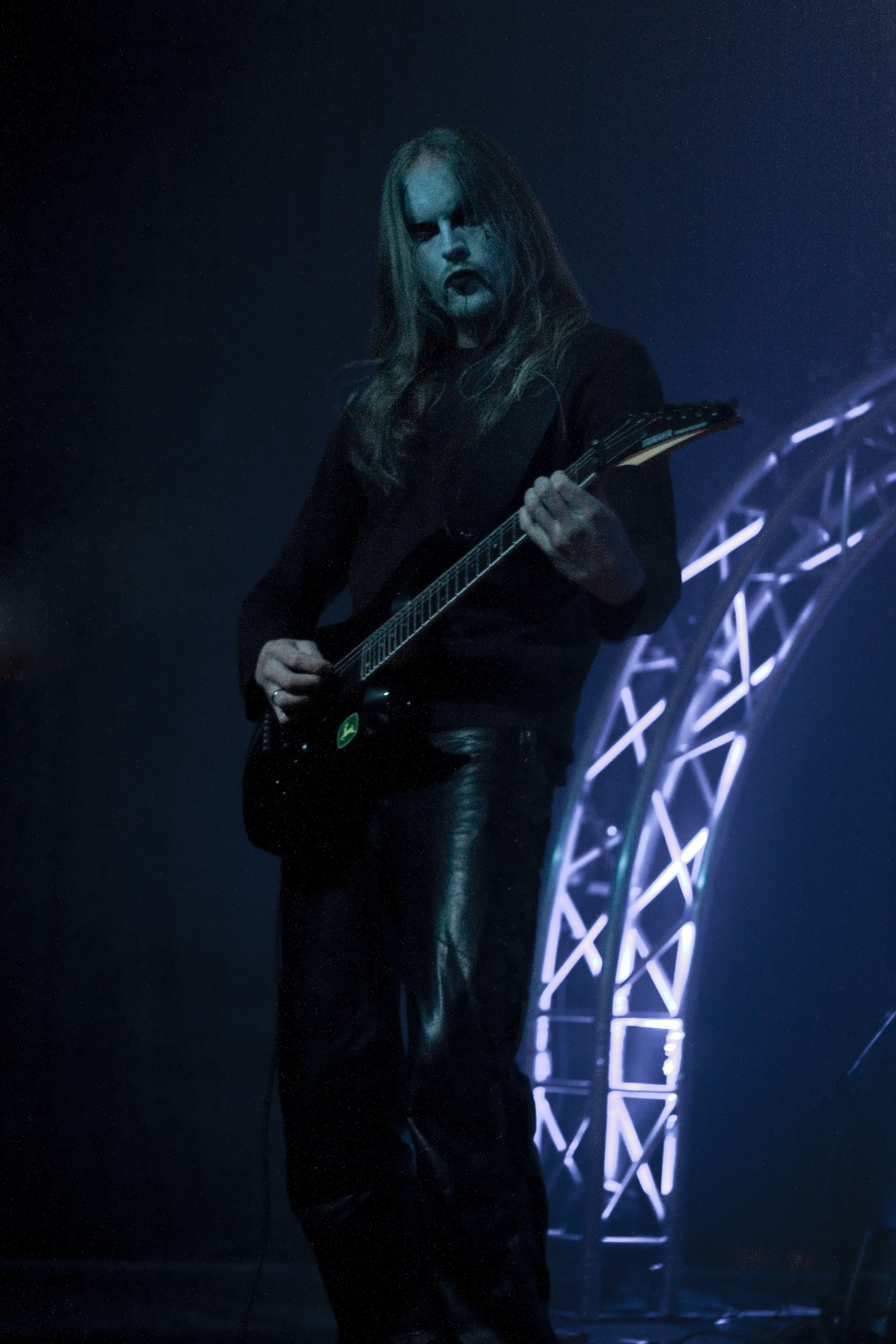
Lars Stokstad, Elements of Rock 2011

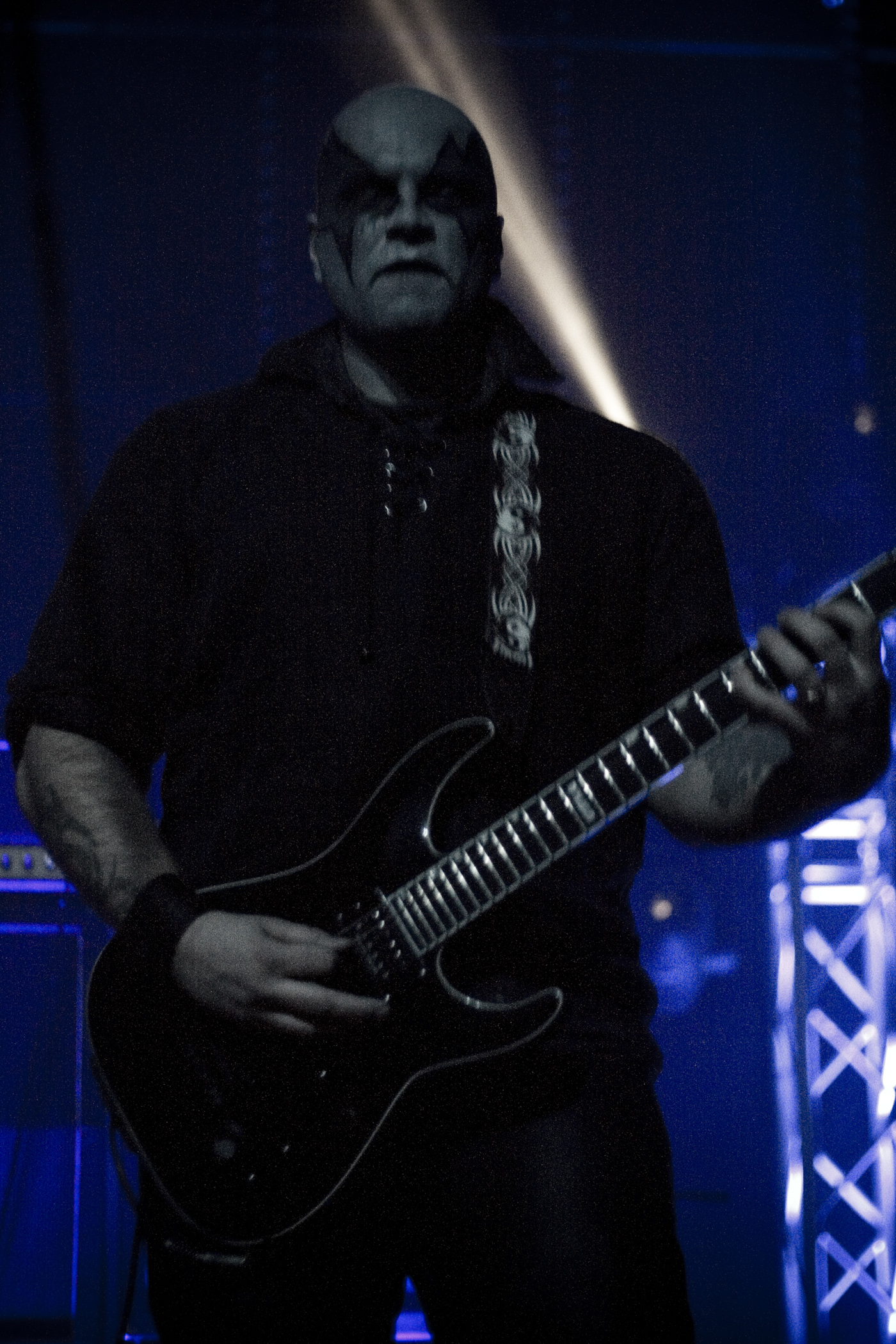
Robert Bordevik, Elements of Rock 2011

Antestor are one of the few bands in the Christian metal scene who use corpse paint in their appearances and on photos. One example is the booklet photos in the album The Return of the Black Death, depicting Antestor in Norsemen outfits and black and white face paints at a snowy Norwegian mountain location. Sometimes the group uses art blood, as known for the session bassist Ravn Furfjord's (Frosthardr) appearance at the Bobfest 2004 concert. The band explains that corpse paint "is the same for us as masking is for actors or mimes: one way to express certain feelings in the battle we are in. The main purpose is to concentrate on God and not to break a lance in side issues like these."

== Reception ==
According to Vrede in an interview with Intense Radio on December 13, 2007, "by various sources, The Return of the Black Death has sold over 10,000 copies and still keeps selling."

Very few published reviews of the band's albums exist, yet the ones that are available are positive, often good and some excellent. Michael Bryzak writes in the liner notes of The Defeat of Satan / Despair that, although the first album was not officially released until 2000, "Martyrium was rightfully considered a cult classic."

The group's position in the Norwegian metal scene was controversial from the beginning. Bryzak writes that "standing up for their faith in Life and Hope, Antestor received serious death threats during this time from some of the major bands and key players of the scene." When asked if the band ever played with other groups in the black metal scene, Antestor said in a 2000 interview with Tcu zine: "We played with some early form of the band Old Man's Child once. Apparently they expressed their opinion of us with their legs and walked out of the venue during our set. It was their way of saying 'screw you Christians.'" In the liner notes of Martyrium, Antestor corresponds in a slightly bitter tone: "For those of you who despised us, disbelieved in us and misplaced your anger upon us, may God have mercy on your poor souls!"

On Antestor's achievements, Bryzak wrote that "The birth of northern Europe's Christian extreme metal scene can be attributed to only one act, Antestor." In 2010, HM Magazine ranked The Return of the Black Death number 40 on their Top 100 Christian metal albums of all-time list with Beck stating about the album, "Devastatingly dark, TRBD set the standard for Christian black metal." Jamie Lee Rake of HM Magazine wrote of the Endtime Productions re-release of Martyrium, wondering if the progressive elements of the album made the band unnoticed innovators in the early Norwegian extreme metal scene:

Throughout Martyrium's nine tracks, there are touches of more progressive deathiness: piano and other keyboards, those nearly operatic female vocals, etc. Some of these touches have become nearly commonplace among some of Antestor's metallic competitors, such as Emperor and their side projects. Might Antestor have been a band of believers who were actually (sit down for this one) innovating in their scene?

== Members ==
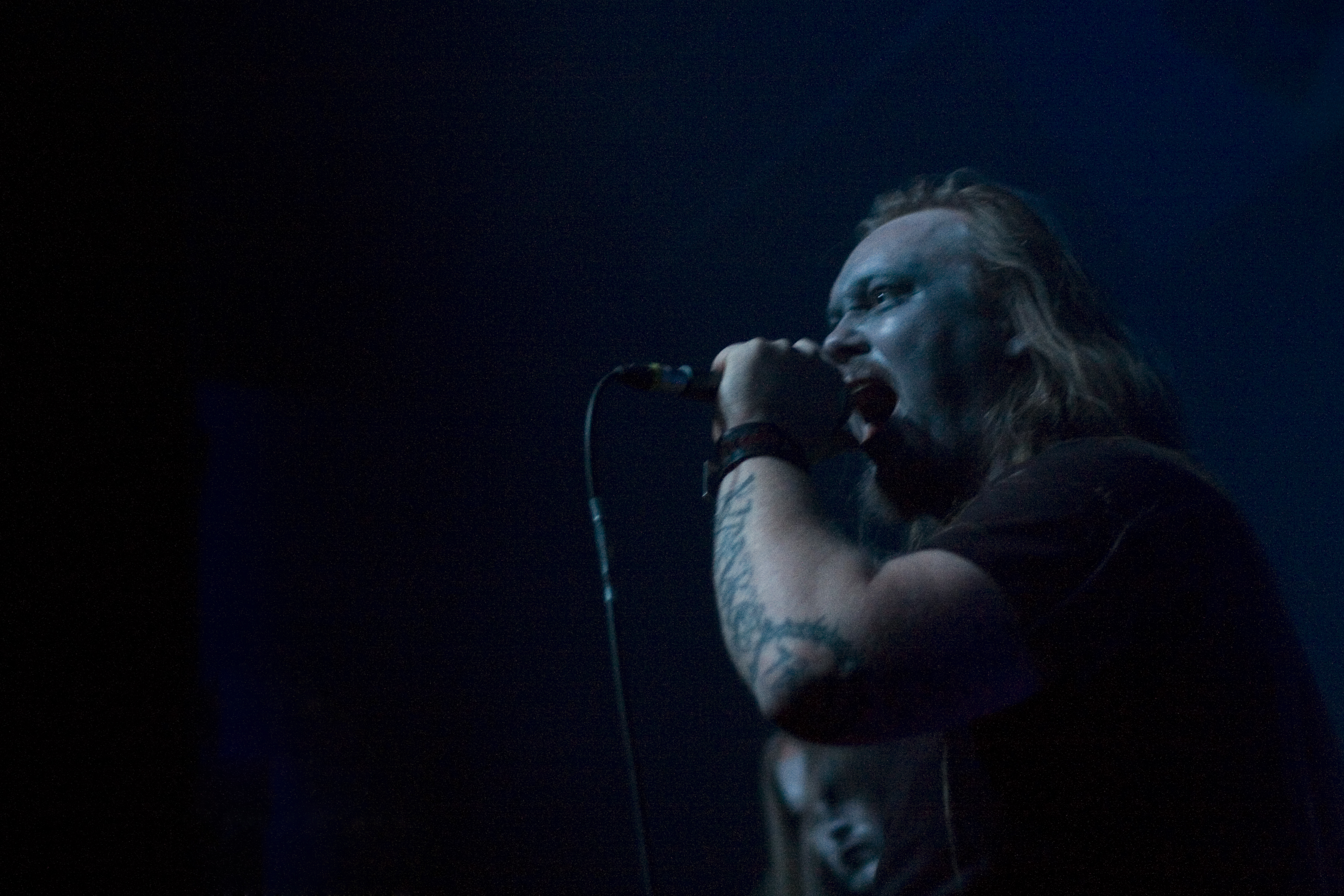
Ronny Hansen at Elements of Rock 2011

Current

Members	Instruments	Years active	Other projects
Ronny "Vrede" Hansen	Vocals	2000–present	Grave Declaration, Sylvan Fortress, Vaakevandring, Morgenroede, Temple of Perdition
Lars "Vemod" Stokstad	Guitars, Clean Vocals, Keyboards (1990-2000, 2013-present)	1990–present	Vaakevandring
Stig "Erkebisp" Rolfsen	Guitars	1995–1997, 2004, 2015-present	
Erik Normann Aanonsen	Bass, Acoustic Instruments	2011–present	Haruko, Moddi, Monograf, Inglvild Østgård
Jo Henning Børven	Drums, Programming	2010–present	Morgenroede, Arvinger, Grave Declaration, Vardøger, Spinning Foundation

Former

Members	Instruments	Years active	Other projects
Robert Bordevik	guitars, backing vocals	2010–2011, 2012–2015	Vardøger, Grievance
Nicholas Main Henriksen	keyboards	2010–2013	Aspera, Illusion, Oceans of Time, DesDemon
Thor Georg Buer	guitars, bass	2010-2012	Grave Declaration
Morten Sigmund "Sygmoon" Mageroy	keyboards	1999–2007	Vaakevandring, Merylia
Vegard "Gard" Undal	bass	1993–2005	
Svein "Armoth" Sander	drums	1993–2000	Mourning Leaves
Tom W. Holm Paulsen	drums	1990–1993	
Øyvind Hope	bass	1990–1993	
Ole Børud	guitars	1996–1997	Extol, Selfmindead, Fleshkiller, Schaliach, Børud Family, Børud-Gjengen
Kjetil "Martyr" Molnes	vocals	1990–1999	
Erling "Pilgrim" Jorgensen	guitars	1990–1993	
Bjørn Leren	guitars	1990–1993, 2003–2005	

Session musicians

- Jan Axel Blomberg (Hellhammer) (2004) – session drums on The Forsaken
- Ann-Mari Edvardsen – session vocals on The Forsaken
- Tora – session vocals on Martyrium

Live musicians

- Fionnghuala (Slechtvalk) – vocals (2000, 2007)
- Ravn "Jokull" Furfjord (Frosthardr) – bass (2002–2005)
- Trond Bjørnstad (Vaakevandring) – bass (2007)
- Pål "Savn" Dæhlen – drums (2001–2003)
- Tony Kirkemo – drums (2003–2006)
- Gustav "Gurra" Elowson (Crimson Moonlight) – drums (2007)

Timeline

- Note: Martyrium was recorded in 1994; while some bootleg copies leaked, the album was not officially released until 2000

== Discography ==
Studio albums

- The Return of the Black Death (1998)
- Martyrium (2000, recorded in 1994)
- The Forsaken (2005)
- Omen (2012)

EPs

- Det tapte liv (2004)

Demos

- The Defeat of Satan (1991)
- Despair (1993)
- Kongsblod (1998, promotional)

Compilations

- The Defeat of Satan (2003)
