= Frosthardr =

Norwegian Christian black metal band

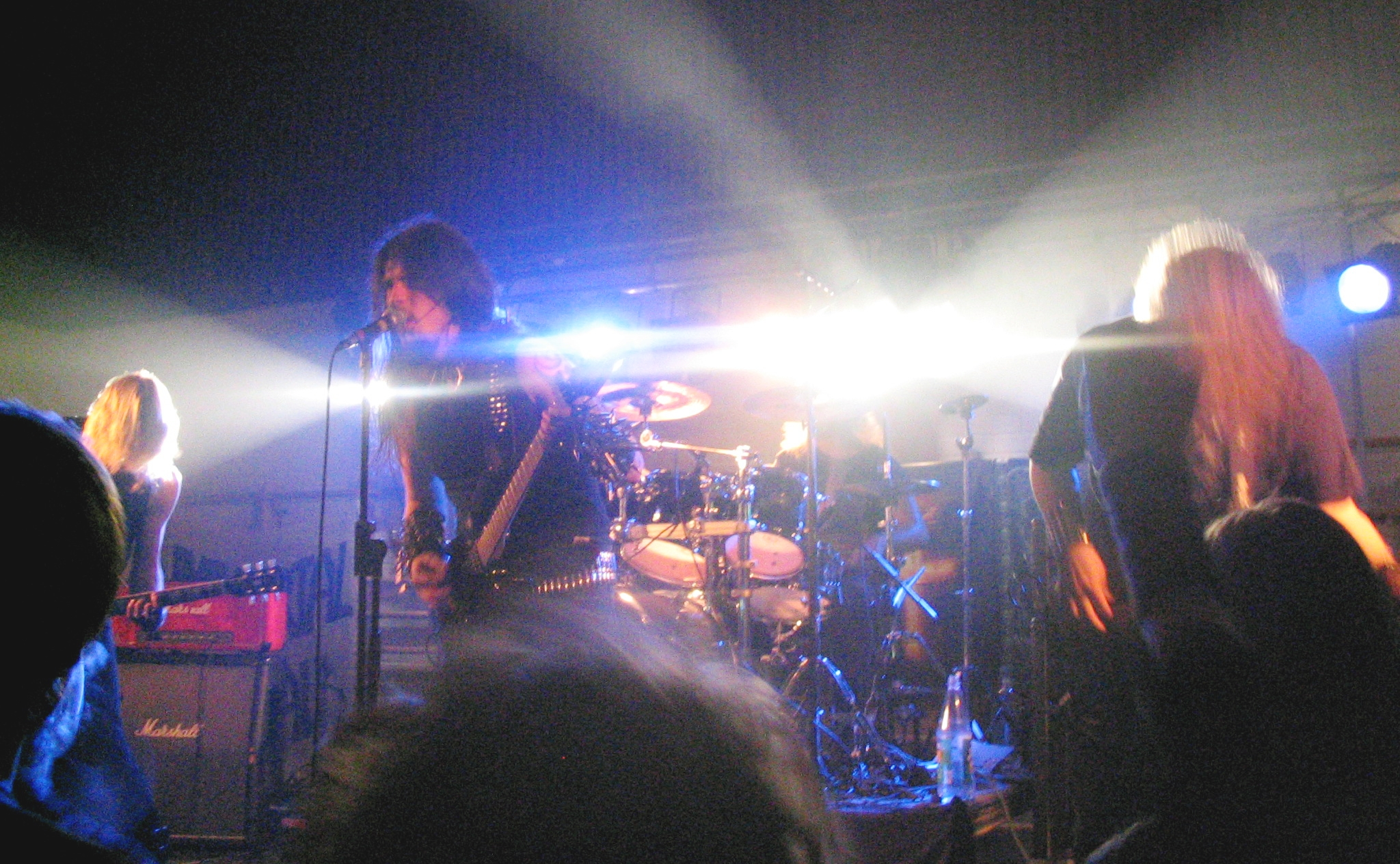
- Frosthardr live in 2005. Left to right: Dr. E, Jokull, Savn, and Ozol

Background information
- Origin: Oslo, Norway
- Genres: Black metal
- Years active: 1997–present
- Labels: Momentum Scandinavia, Nordic Mission Productions
- Members: Jokull; Dr. E Ozol; Savn
- Website: Frosthardr.com

Frosthardr is a Norwegian Christian black metal band, formed in 1997. The band plays a raw type of black metal music with occasional punk influences and lyrics from Christian point of view. The drummer Pål Daehlen (Savn) is a former member of the influential black metal group Vaakevandring, and the vocalist/guitarist Jokull has played as a live member for the ground breaking act Antestor. Frosthardr has achieved some media notice: They appeared on the British 2007 documentary film Murder Music: A History of Black Metal, and are one of the featured bands on the 2008 documentary film, Light in Darkness – Nemesis Divina, focused on Christian black metal. Signed to Momentum Scandinavia, the band has released a demo and two EPs. In 2007, they played concerts at Cornerstone Festival, Bushnell, Illinois, USA.

An album was released in late 2018 on Nordic Mission Productions.

== History ==
In March 1997, the bass player Jokull formed Frosthardr and was joined by vocalist Dr. E. He switched from vocals to guitar and Jokull did vocals while still playing bass. After a while, Jokull started playing guitar along with vocals.

In 2001, a drummer known as Savn joined them. Frosthardr recorded a two-song demo titled Necrodisaster 2002 in the summer of 2001. They performed live as a three-piece band alongside the gothic metal band Grøde and Diamondog. In January 2002, Ozol joined Frosthardr on bass. Necrodisaster 2002 was released in March, and Frosthardr did their first real live performance at Askim Metal Night among with groups such as Drottnar, Mondo Revolver, Bleedience, and Questor. Later that summer they played at DP-Arts & Music festival in Blaker, Norway, alongside over 50 other groups and artists.

The band was a part of a sampler album for Tarantula Promotions, titled Arachnid Terror Sampler, which featured bands such as Soul Embraced, Tortured Conscience, Kekal and Frost Like Ashes.

In between writing new songs during 2003, Frosthardr played at Destructionfest in London, UK, and Nordicfest in Oslo, Norway before entering the studio to record their debut EP Maktesløs. The EP was recorded and mixed during the winter and released through Momentum Scandinavia in March 2004. During the same month Frosthardr and Drottnar did a small tour in Switzerland and Czech Republic, including a concert at the Elements of Rock festival in Switzerland. They also played Metalafton in Alingsås in April, and a couple of shows in December 2004. Jokull played bass in Antestor's live performances during Bobfest 2004. During early 2005 Frosthardr made a minitour with the Dutch band Slechtvalk.

Frosthardr recorded new material in 2006 and first released an EP, Varg, in 2007. In 2007 they played at Cornerstone Festival, appeared on the documentary film Murder Music: A History of Black Metal in which vocalist Ravn Furfjord reveals that "It is difficult to find people who are interested in this kind of music and share our point of view, the Christian point of view." The band was featured on the 2008 documentary, Light in Darkness – Nemesis Divina, which was shown at film and music festivals throughout the world and deals with the commonly viewed as 'paradoxal' concept of Christian black metal. The documentary was produced by Stefan Rydehed, whose previous works include a documentary on the Norwegian black metal band Mayhem.

They released the self-titled album Frosthardr on 1 December 2018 on physical formats, and the album was later released digitally on 21 January 2019.

== Members ==
Current

- Ravn "Jokull" Furfjord - guitar, vocals (1997–present), bass (1997)
- Dr. E - guitar, additional vocals (1997–present)
- Oddmund "Ozol" - bass (2002–present)
- Pål "Savn" Dæhlen - drums (2001–present)

Live

- Morten "Sygmoon" Sigmund - keyboards
- David "Djerv" Ryste - vocals (2015–present)

== Discography ==
- Necrodisaster (demo, 2002)
- Maktesløs (EP, 2004)
- Varg (EP, 2007)
- Frosthardr (album, 2018)
