= Unblack metal =

Religious philosophy and subgenre of black metal music

- Stylistic origins: Black metal; Christian metal
- Cultural origins: Early 1990s, Australia, Scandinavia

Other topics
- Ambient black metal; symphonic black metal; Christian death metal

Unblack metal (also known as Unblackened metal, Christian black metal or White metal) is a religious philosophy and subgenre within black metal, inheriting several characteristics of it, such as the melody, the lyrics and the aesthetics (corpse paint), whose artists promote Christianity in their lyrics and imagery and sometimes directly oppose the Satanism prevalent in most black metal. Unblack metal artists are controversial within the black metal subculture, because black metal's pioneers, especially those of the Second Wave, were anti-Christian. It is also suggested that Christianity contradicts black metal's dark nature and the individualistic and misanthropic ideals of many bands.

The exact beginning of the unblack metal movement is disputed. The Australian band Horde's 1994 album Hellig Usvart brought the concept and the term "holy unblack metal" (a word play on Darkthrone's slogan "unholy black metal" used on the albums A Blaze in the Northern Sky and Under a Funeral Moon) to media attention, while the Norwegian band Antestor was already formed in 1990 as a death/doom act and released its demo The Defeat of Satan in 1991, before they began shifting towards unblack metal on their 1994 album Martyrium.

== Characteristics ==
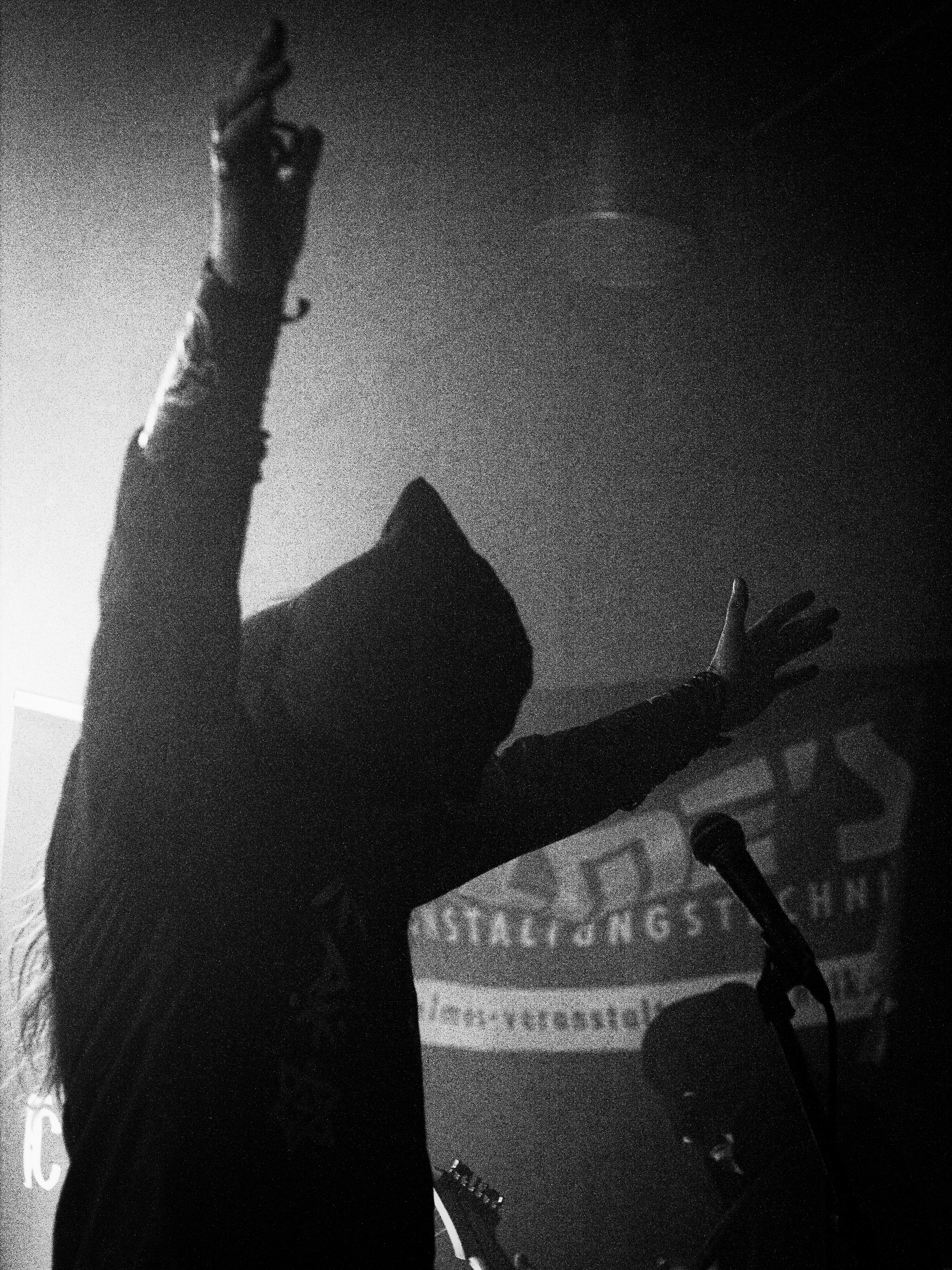
Pilgrim of Crimson Moonlight

Unblack metal is a genre derived from black metal that focuses on Christian lyrical themes. Unblack metal incorporates black metal's fast tempos, shrieked vocals, highly distorted guitars, tremolo picking, double-kick drumming, repetition and often unconventional song structure. Garry Sharpe-Young's 2001 encyclopedia A-Z of Black Metal states that "[t]opping the lot are Christian 'Unblack' acts who for all intents and purposes look like, sound like and employ the imagery of Black Metal whilst hidden in the unpenetrable vocal growls and distortions are the proclamations of Jesus Christ".

Some unblack metal artists, such as Horde, write lyrics that explicitly attack Satanism. This remained a dominant theme throughout most of the 1990s. In the late 1990s, groups began to write more philosophical and ideological lyrics. These often include stories of conversion, doubt, salvation, struggles with faith, and the darker side of living a Christian life. Unblack metal bands may justify their use of the black metal style with reasons ranging from genuine appreciation of the musical genre, to evangelization towards the largely anti-Christian black metal scene, i.e. "bringing light into darkness".

== History ==
=== Background ===
The 1970s occult boom influenced many early heavy metal bands lyricwise. In the early 1980s, several bands dealt such themes in a more extreme manner, including Venom, Mercyful Fate and Bathory. During the mid-1980s, heavy metal music divided into many subgenres, and black metal emerged as one of them, taking its name from a Venom album of the same title. In the 1980s, the term was imprecise with regards to musical attributes, simply referring to all metal bands with Satanic lyrical themes. Although Christian metal bands had existed since the late 1970s, a clear contrast with black metal occurred in 1984 with the release of American doom metal band Trouble's significantly Bible-based debut album Psalm 9. Metal Blade Records marketed Trouble as "white metal" as opposed to black metal. Vocalist Eric Wagner explained in 2006 that "back in the early 1980s, all the metal was kind of Satanic," and implied that Metal Blade (or the owner Brian Slagel) actually invented the term in the first place: "I think it was more like Metal Blade trying to be cute or something, with everything being called black metal, so why not call us white metal, which is a bunch of crap."

=== Early 1990s ===
"Invert the Inverted Cross"
Sample of "Invert the Inverted Cross" by Horde, from the album Hellig Usvart (1994). Horde's lyrical themes were known to be anti-Satanic, and the music represents the older school of unblack metal.

The Australian band Horde's debut album Hellig Usvart, recorded and released in 1994, is often credited for being the first unblack metal album, although the sole member "Anonymous" has stated that, "there were similar [unblack] bands prior to Horde, even in Norway," referring to Antestor who formed in 1990. Prior to 1993, they were a death-doom band called Crush Evil. Antestor's debut album Martyrium was also recorded in 1994 and marked a shift into unblack metal territory. However, due to issues with the band's record label at the time, the album was not officially released until 2000. Euronymous of Mayhem expressed in an interview that someone would need to force Crush Evil to disband.

Hellig Usvart (Norwegian for Holy Unblack) caused great controversy in the black metal scene, and death threats were sent to Nuclear Blast Records headquarters demanding them to release the members' names. Later, it was discovered that the only actual member was the former Mortification/Paramaecium drummer Jayson Sherlock from Australia. The term "unblack metal" was derived from "holy unblack metal", which was a wordplay on Darkthrone's "unholy black metal" term. Media became interested in this controversy. On 6 June 1995, the Norwegian weekly newspaper Morgenbladet published an article about the phenomenon of unblack metal, describing Horde's album as "an abrupt satire of the Norwegian black metal movement". Antestor was also interviewed, with vocalist Kjetil Molnes stating "We identify ourselves as black metal as a music style, not black metal as an ideology or belief."

=== Late 1990s ===
After 1995, influenced by Horde, other unblack metal bands started releasing their first demos. The Indonesian group Kekal soon became associated with the movement. Eduardo Rivadavia of AllMusic wrote that "Kekal are one of the first heavy metal bands from Jakarta, Indonesia, to make international inroads, and they may just be the first to profess Christian beliefs while performing black metal." However, Kekal has resisted being labeled as Christian, with former front-man Jeff Arwadi stating that he views "Christian metal" as a market brand that to him does not make sense.

"A Sovereign Fortress"
Sample of "A Sovereign Fortress" by Antestor, from the album The Return of the Black Death (1998). This sample represents Antestor's "sorrow metal" style: a mixture of viking metal and doom metal.

Antestor's 1998 release The Return of the Black Death proved highly influential for the unblack metal movement. The album was released on the British Cacophonous Records, which has released records by such successful black metal groups as Cradle of Filth and Dimmu Borgir. According to Matt Morrow, it became the only unblack metal album besides Horde's Hellig Usvart to be released on a secular label in the 1990s, although Kekal released Beyond the Glimpse of Dreams on a secular label in the same year. The established British magazines Kerrang! and Terrorizer both gave The Return of the Black Death 4 points out of 5.

Vaakevandring's self-titled EP (recorded in 1998) was produced by Stian Aarstad, the keyboard player of Dimmu Borgir. The release achieved worldwide attention and later became recognized a "classic" in the unblack metal scene. In 1998, the metalcore group Underoath was founded, and played hardcore and metalcore mixed with black and death metal. The band subsequently moved away from this early black metal sound to a more mainstream post-hardcore style.

=== 2000s ===
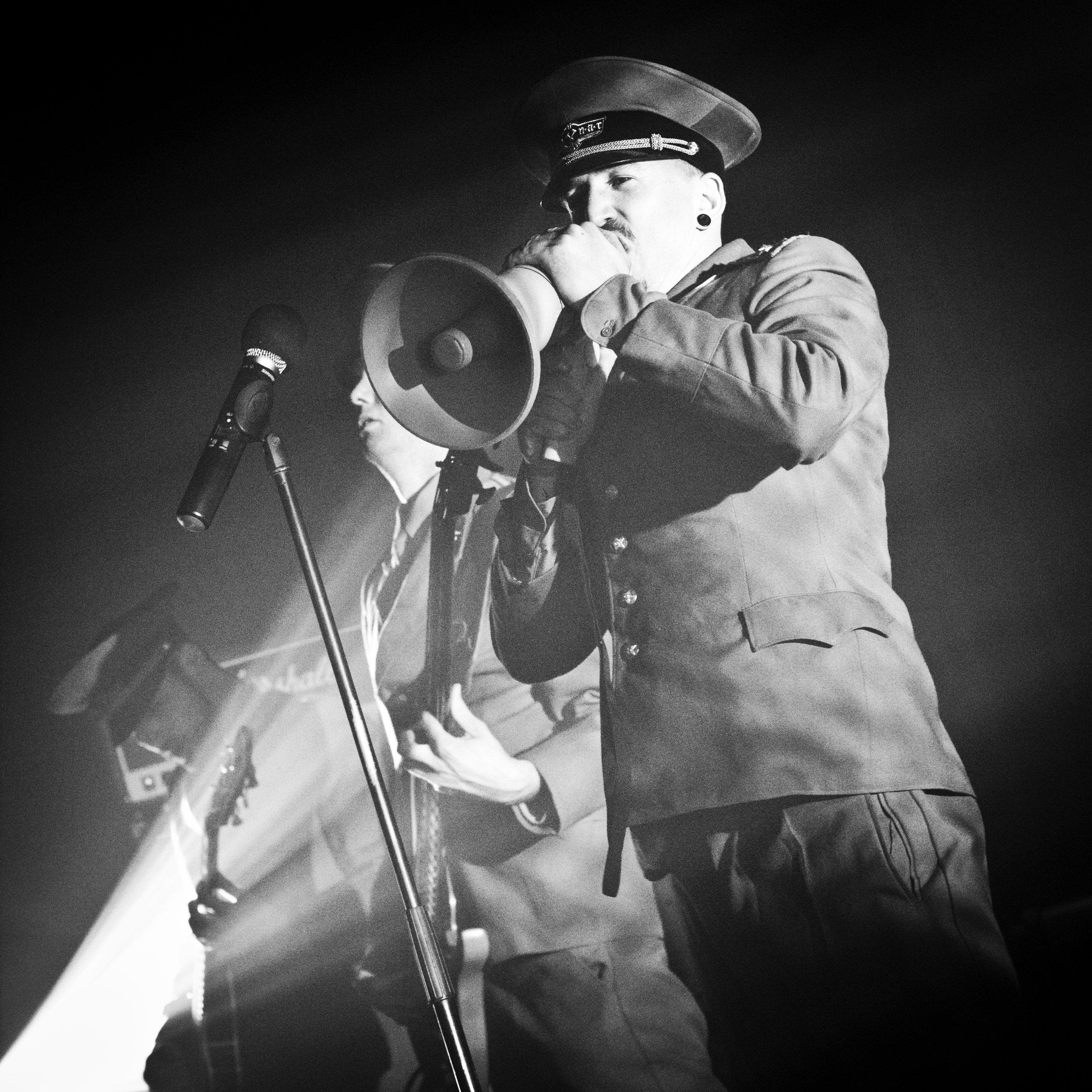
The Norwegian group Drottnar live at Elements of Rock, Switzerland in 2013

During the early 2000s, according to Screams of Abel magazine, there was an "international explosion of Christian black metal bands", and black metal "seemed to be the fastest growing genre in the Christian metal scene". In 2000, Lengsel's debut album Solace was critically acclaimed, Sanctifica released Spirit of Purity, Crimson Moonlight released its debut album The Covenant Progress, while Drottnar released its demos on an album titled Spiritual Battle, gaining them popularity among the Scandinavian underground.

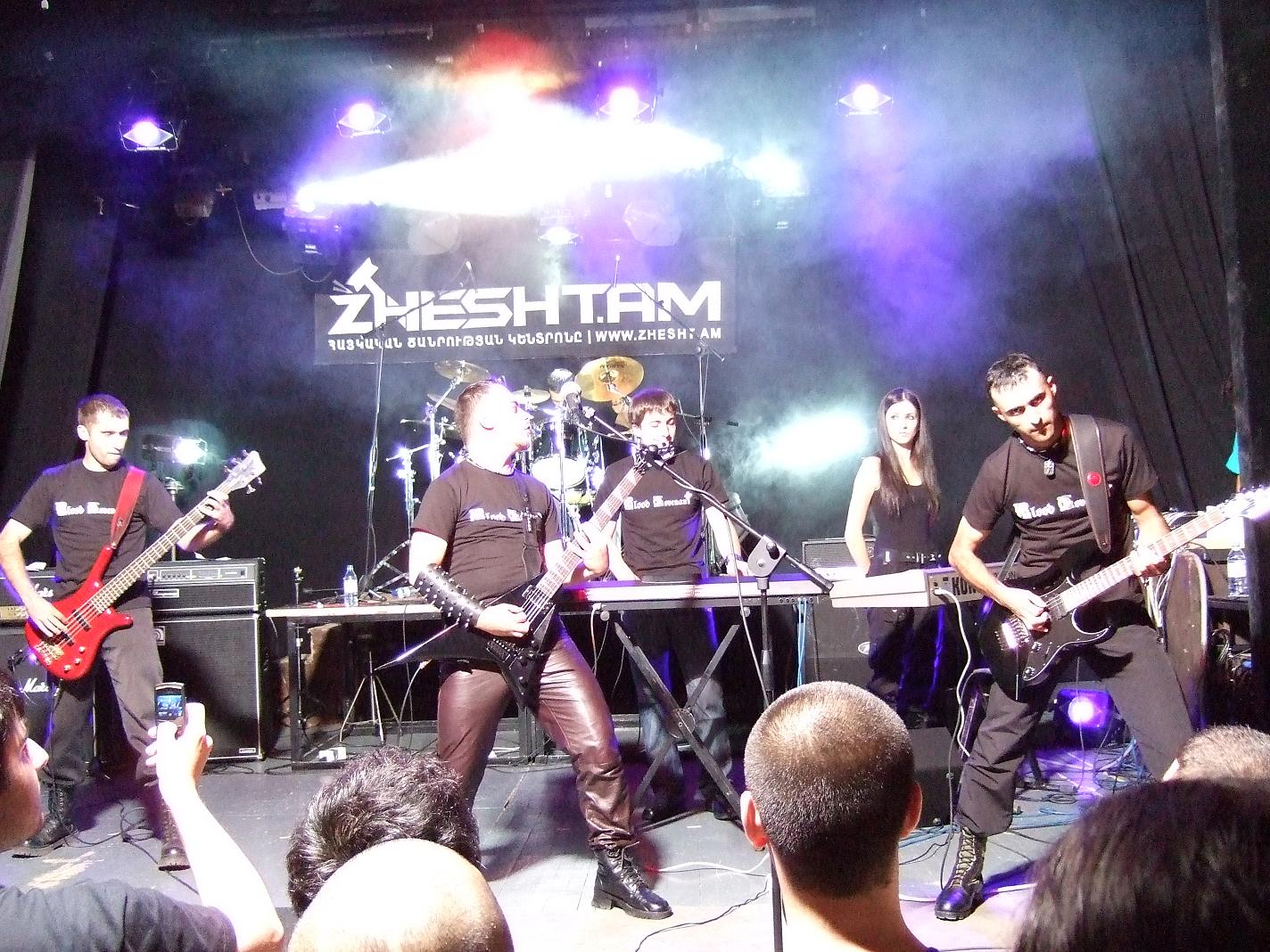
Blood Covenant, an Armenian Christian black metal band

Apart from Scandinavia, unblack metal has developed regional scenes in the United States, South America, and Central Europe. The Kansas City-based Frost Like Ashes is an American band.

The South and Central American unblack scenes are known for their radical anti-Satanic attitude. Groups such as Exousia and Mexico's Deborah have performed internationally in Europe.

In Poland, notable unblack metal groups include Abdijah, Fire Throne, and Elgibbor. The latter was featured on a short Polish TV documentary that focused on unblack metal. The Netherlands has groups such as Dormant and Slechtvalk. Although the latter does not currently consider themselves as a "Christian band"

== Media attention ==
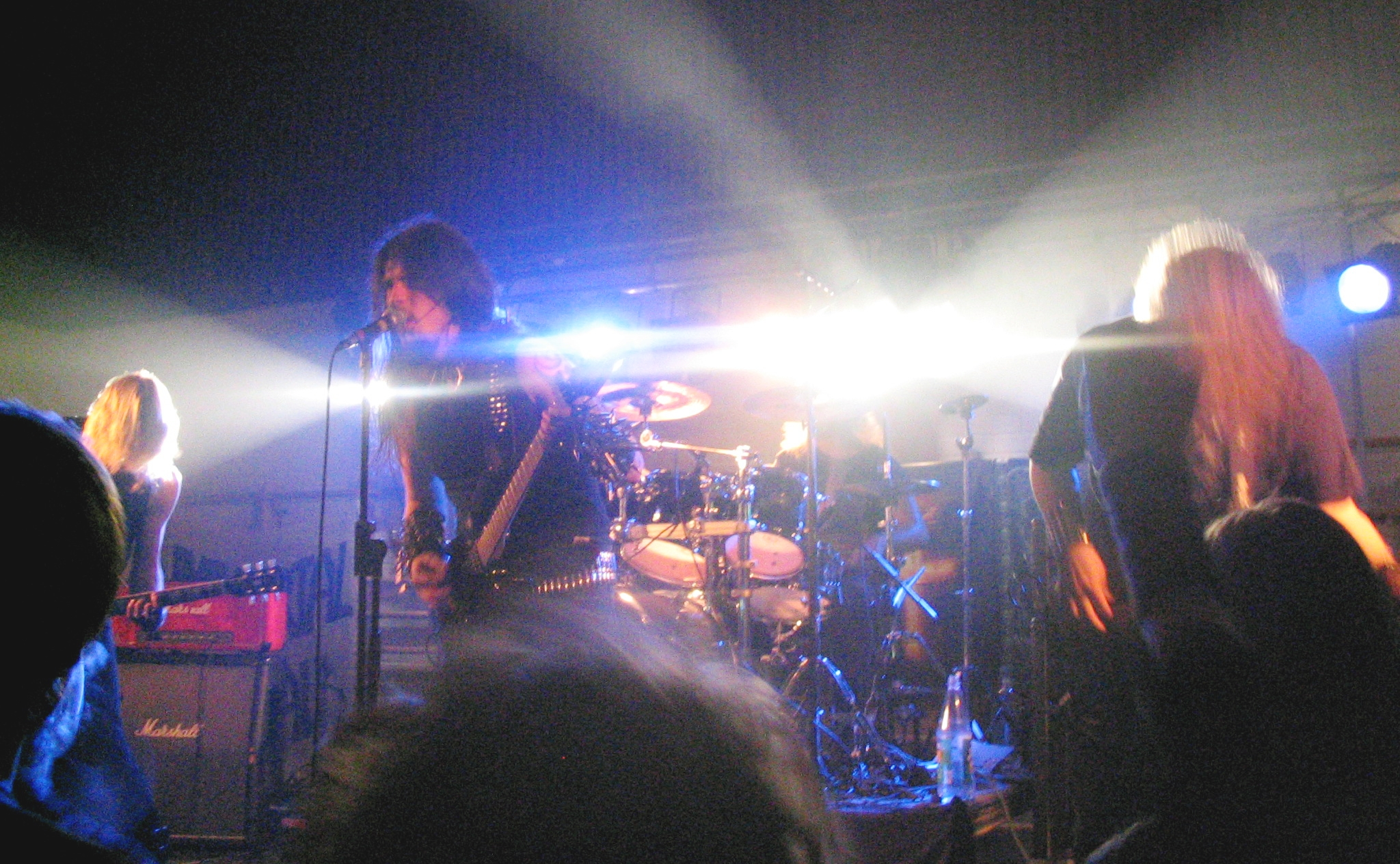
Frosthardr live at Immortal Metal Fest 2005, Finland. The group appeared on the Murder Music - Black Metal documentary, and has performed at the American Cornerstone Festival.

In 2006, Admonish achieved wider notice when twins Emil (guitar) and Jonas Karlsson (bass) both appeared on the MTV Europe show Pimp My Ride International. On that show, in which their car was modified, the twins advertised their band and Admonish's music was played.

In 2007, the Norwegian band Frosthardr appeared on the documentary feature film Murder Music: A History of Black Metal. They were interviewed for a minute and represented the Christian point of view in black metal music, with vocalist Daniel Ravn Fufjord saying: "It is difficult to find musicians that are interested in this kind of music and share our point of view."

== Controversies ==
Certain critics, such as Jussi Lahtonen of the Finnish indie rock magazine Sue, have argued that separating Christian from non-Christian black metal artists "feels rather pointless". However, early groups such as Horde and Antestor refused to call their music "black metal" because they felt that the style was strongly associated with Satanism. Horde called its music "holy unblack metal", and Antestor preferred to call their music "sorrow metal" instead. Stefan Rydehed, director of the metal documentary Light in Darkness – Nemesis Divina says about the unblack metal musicians based on his interviews: "The Christian black metal musicians see themselves as a part of the black metal community but they have a hard time to be accepted. Not only from other black metal musicians but also the society and ordinary Christians."

Many current unblack metal bands feel that black metal has changed from an ideological movement to a purely musical genre, and that is why they refer to their music as black metal. The Swedish group Crimson Moonlight's vocalist Simon Rosén, for example, says in an interview with WhiteMetal.it site: "First of all, we don't want to call our music unblack metal or white metal, we play black metal." In an interview with Ultimate Metal, Rosén further explains this view:

We believe that all kinds of music are now neutral. I mean, a music genre cannot be "evil" itself. It all depends on the purpose: why you're doing it and what the lyrics are about. I will use an illustration to explain: a knife in the hands of a murderer can kill life, but a knife in the hands of a doctor can save life. Now is the knife evil itself? No, it depends on how you use it. The power is in our hands to decide what we want to use music for. I know that many black metal fans react badly when we use the words "black metal" to describe our music, and we are sorry if we make people upset for that. But for us, black metal is a musical genre. Listen to Veil of Remembrance and tell me what kind of music it is.

In contrast, Jayson Sherlock of Horde posted on Facebook on February 5, 2013 that he doubted whether Christians can play black metal music, saying, "For the life of me, I will never understand why Christians think they can play Black Metal. I really don't think they understand what true Black Metal is."

On the other side, many in the black metal scene see "Christian black metal" as an oxymoron. On the British black metal documentary Murder Music: A History of Black Metal (2007), all interviewed musicians stated - when asked about the matter - that black metal cannot be Christian. The term "Christian black metal" drew mocking replies from the black metal musicians, for example Martin Walkyier of the English metal band Sabbat commented: "'Christian black metal?' What do they do? Do they build churches? Do they repair them? (laughs)". Jonathan Selzer, editor of the British metal magazine Terrorizer discussed his experiences and thoughts in the documentary:

We had a debate in our letter pages that went on for six weeks. It was about whether or not you can play Christian black metal. It all started with a review [of a Christian black metal album], and the editor just didn't know what to make of it. Redemption is one [of] the most antithetical themes to black metal there is. Black metal is about your humanity, not about giving your humanity over to a god. Maybe there are some aspects in Christianity, maybe some Old Testament 'hang 'em high' kind of wrath that might actually find parallel with black metal.

While the Indonesian band Kekal has been labeled as unblack metal, the band has distanced itself from the movement. When asked if he was bothered by the fact that the first black metal bands were against Christianity, front-man Jeff Arwadi replied: "I think you're wrong if [the] first black metal bands were highly against Christianity. […] I dig the very first black metal bands a lot... those 80s bands like Venom, Bathory, Hellhammer/Celtic Frost, early Sodom, etc. […] By my knowledge, none of those bands were against Christianity. They only had those kind of 'satanic' image which is more like some high-school Halloween movies or parent-shocker rather than Satanism as a philosophy or ideology". Earlier in the interview he even went as far as to say that "even bands like Celtic Frost were once considered 'white-metal' from some 'true' black metal fans because the band thanked God on album thanks list, and one member wearing a cross necklace instead of inverted cross. It's a totally relative issue, depending on how 'extreme' you would go, right?" Whereas Arwadi claimed that to his knowledge, "none of those bands were against Christianity", Bathory founder Quorthon rejected Christianity in numerous interviews.

In a 2007 Beat the Blizzard webzine's article, the writer Jan Lindsø states that "[m]any metal fans are of the opinion that Christians should 'not be allowed' to use the black metal aesthetics musically since they do not inherit this evil and perhaps misantropic [sic] trait that many people say is necessary in order to be convincing as black metal musicians". Kittil Kittilsen, who left Mayhem in 1988 after becoming a born-again Christian, expressed his concern for the unblack metal musicians: "I think they're completely off the mark. I cannot seriously understand how they even manage to do it. They have missed the target completely. I mean, if you want to be a Christian, be it with all you've got, and if you want to be metal, be it with all you've got. If those people really took their faith seriously, and followed the instructions of the One they profess to believe in, they would never be found in a context like that. They are on collision course with Christian life and teaching. I say this because of my own experience, and because of what is written in the Bible; rock music, metal music has nothing at all to do in a Christian setting!"

In an interview with Screams of Abel webzine, former Antestor member Morten Mageroy reacted with caution to the proliferation of unblack bands: "I really hope that people (who play Christian black metal) know what they are doing. I know this sounds very rough, but I have seen people being pulled into something they do not know. I am not saying that I know that these musicians are going to mess their lives up, but I have seen it happen to some people and it frightens me very much." Mageroy, however, defends the unblack metal bands' intentions: "A lot of Christian bands have done amazing things being led by God. I know that God is using many types of communication, and it is important that Christians is [sic] present in every field, in every genre, privately and in work. God might just as well use heavy metal to bring salvation to people."

Some of the original Norwegian black metal musicians believe that black metal does not need to hold any ideologies. For example, Jan Axel "Hellhammer" Blomberg of Mayhem has said in an interview with Metal Library: "In my opinion, black metal today is just music. I will tell you that neither I nor other [current] members of Mayhem never really were against religion or something else. We are primarily interested in music." Although rejecting the idea of "Christian black metal", Satyricon's vocalist Sigurd Wongraven stated in the Murder Music documentary that black metal "doesn't necessarily have to be all Satanic as long as it's dark".

== See also ==
- List of unblack metal artists
- List of Christian metal artists
- List of black metal bands, 0–K
- List of black metal bands, L–Z
