= Maniacal Entropik Discordium =

Studio album by Symphony of Heaven
- Released: December 17, 2021
- Recorded: 2020–2021
- Studio: Rusted Recordings Studios
- Genres: Extreme metal; death metal; melodic death metal; blackened death metal; black metal; unblack metal
- Length: 1:19:06
- Label: Rottweiler Records
- Producer: Logan Thompson

Symphony of Heaven chronology
| The Ascension of Extinction (2020) | Maniacal Entropik Discordium (2021) | LIVE @ Rusted Recordings Studio Volume 1 (2022) |

Singles from Maniacal Entropik Discordium
- 1. "Dead Winter Fields" Released: April 2, 2021; 2. "Entropy" Released: July 2, 2021; 3. "The Arch of Time" Released: September 11, 2021

Maniacal Entropik Discordium is the second album by melodic death metal band Symphony of Heaven. The album was released in 2021, four years after the debut of The Season of Death on Nosral Recordings. The album is the debut of Eero Tertsunen (Renascent, The Slave Eye, Angel of Sodom) on guitars, David "Timōrātus" Napier (Timōrātus) on bass, and Mason "Asaph" Beard (Mystic Winter) on drums, which saw founder Logan "Pathos" Thompson switch from everything to solely guitars and vocals. The album was originally titled Entropy, however Thompson changed the title later on throughout the process.

The album was released by Rottweiler Records on December 17, 2021. The album was initially to be released on November 26, 2021, however, it was pushed back. The album also features a cover of Death's song "Flesh and the Power It Holds" off of the 1998 album, The Sound of Perseverance.

== Lyrical themes ==
The album was predominately written by Pathos, while one track - "Obtaining Tranquility" - was written by Asaph. "SoulRetch" was written with intense agony and anger in mind, to the point of inducing spiritual vomit, while "The Grieving" was created after experiencing a traumatic event, which led to seeking solace with family. "Obtaining Tranquility", on the other hand, is about the hope that lies beyond, even through the trauma.

When we were recording the album, all of us were in difficult places at different times. Ultimately, we all struggled with a form of loss in our own lives and a fair amount of depression fell on us during those times. But we persevered and took our suffering and turned it into something we are proud of - Asaph

Despite not writing the cover song “Flesh and the Power It Holds”, Asaph stated that he felt as though the cover tied in with the theme of the album and summed up all the topics covered more in depth, as well as with the beliefs of the band.

== Critical reception ==
Professional ratings
Review scores
| Source | Rating |
|---|---|
| Beyond the Grave | 9/10 stars |
| Metal Temple | 10/10 stars |
| Metal.it | 7.5/10 stars |
| Indy Metal Archive | C+ |
| The Metal Onslaught | 5/10 stars |
| Eternal Terror | 5.5/6 stars |

Beyond the Grave Magazine reviewer Erik Morgan stated that "This album is up for album of the year for me. The musicianship, the sound, and the quality on display here are something that I’ve been looking for, for awhile now. If you like Behemoth, but you can’t look past the blatant satanic themes, then this is the album and band for you." Other sites, such as Imperative UK, compared the band to other acts such as Behemoth, The Absence, Insomnium, and Omnium Gatherum.

Ricardo Casagrande of the site Metal Temple gave the album a 10/10 in four different categories, giving a complementary review: "The band puts on a display of being able to change tempo and rhythm, while mixing in some very creative musical writing. They have a lot of range as for what they can come up with and are not looking to be overly powerful every riff of the way. This is not a short album by any means, clocking in at just under an hour and twenty minutes and they use every minute of it to display an array of metal. This album should be a crowd pleaser for any metalhead that comes across its path."

A review from Alessandro Zaina gave a distinct review of 7.5 out of 10, reporting the following: "This is the message that SOH launches at the head of that sonic assault that responds to the name of Maniacal Entropik Discordium: it is a cry of challenge, a message of hope and finally a celebration, a triumph of faith and resistance over adversity. And if someone were to turn up their noses at the fact that a death metal band can convey a "Christian" message and be credible and ferocious at the same time, to change their minds they would have to do nothing but put on this record. Don't trust my words, trust your ears."

Bobby Ellis of Indy Metal Archive gave the album a C+, remarking the following: “The skeleton of a very good album is here, it’s just being hidden by baggy clothes. And if you feel like that metaphor was written poorly and just doesn’t quite work as well as it should, then you’ve just experienced what it’s like to listen to Maniacal Entropic Discordium.” In addition to this review, Christian Sullivan of The Metal Onslaught gave a 5 out of 10 rating, remarking that "It didn’t have that memorable engagement that would entice me to play over and over and over again. I’m getting that feeling that I won’t be picking up this album very often. All I have is love for these boys, as I mentioned before, I have followed them since the Nosral Recordings days. This is their first full-length as a full outfit, which is seriously cool, and a huge congratulations."

Conversely, author ER of the site Eternal Terror gave the album a 5.5 out of 6, praising the album; "With their second album “Maniacal Entropik Discordium” Symphony Of Heaven proves that heavy metal can be brilliantly and skilfully made by musicians who are neither Satanists nor atheists/agnostics and that the Almighty can get glory even from such a controversial musical genre as extreme metal without the musicians either watering the Gospel or the power of the chord-driven atmospherics. But this album is not just for the fans of Christian heavy metal because if you enjoy any of the aforementioned secular acts then this one is for you who is reading this now."

== Track listing ==
| No. | Title | Length |
|---|---|---|
| 1. | "SoulRetch" | 7:52 |
| 2. | "Light Upon the Pillars" | 5:35 |
| 3. | "To Gaze Upon Destruction" | 6:40 |
| 4. | "Entropy" | 5:10 |
| 5. | "Dead Winter Fields" | 7:08 |
| 6. | "The Darkest Nights" | 5:50 |
| 7. | "The Grieving" | 7:26 |
| 8. | "The Arch of Time" | 5:37 |
| 9. | "Verge of Annihilation" | 6:07 |
| 10. | "Obtaining Tranquility" | 6:26 |
| 11. | "Amid the Righteous Oaks" | 6:43 |
| 12. | "Flesh and the Power It Holds (Death cover)" | 8:32 |

== Personnel ==
Symphony of Heaven

- Logan "Pathos" Thompson - vocals, rhythm guitars, keyboards, producer, engineer
- Eero Tertsunen - lead guitars
- David "Timōrātus" Napier - bass
- Mason "Asaph" Beard - drums, backing vocals

Production

- Derek Corzine - mixing, mastering, additional instrumentation
- Shawn Browning - executive producer

Artwork

- Paul Stier - artwork
