= Deuteronomium (band) =

Finnish Christian death metal band

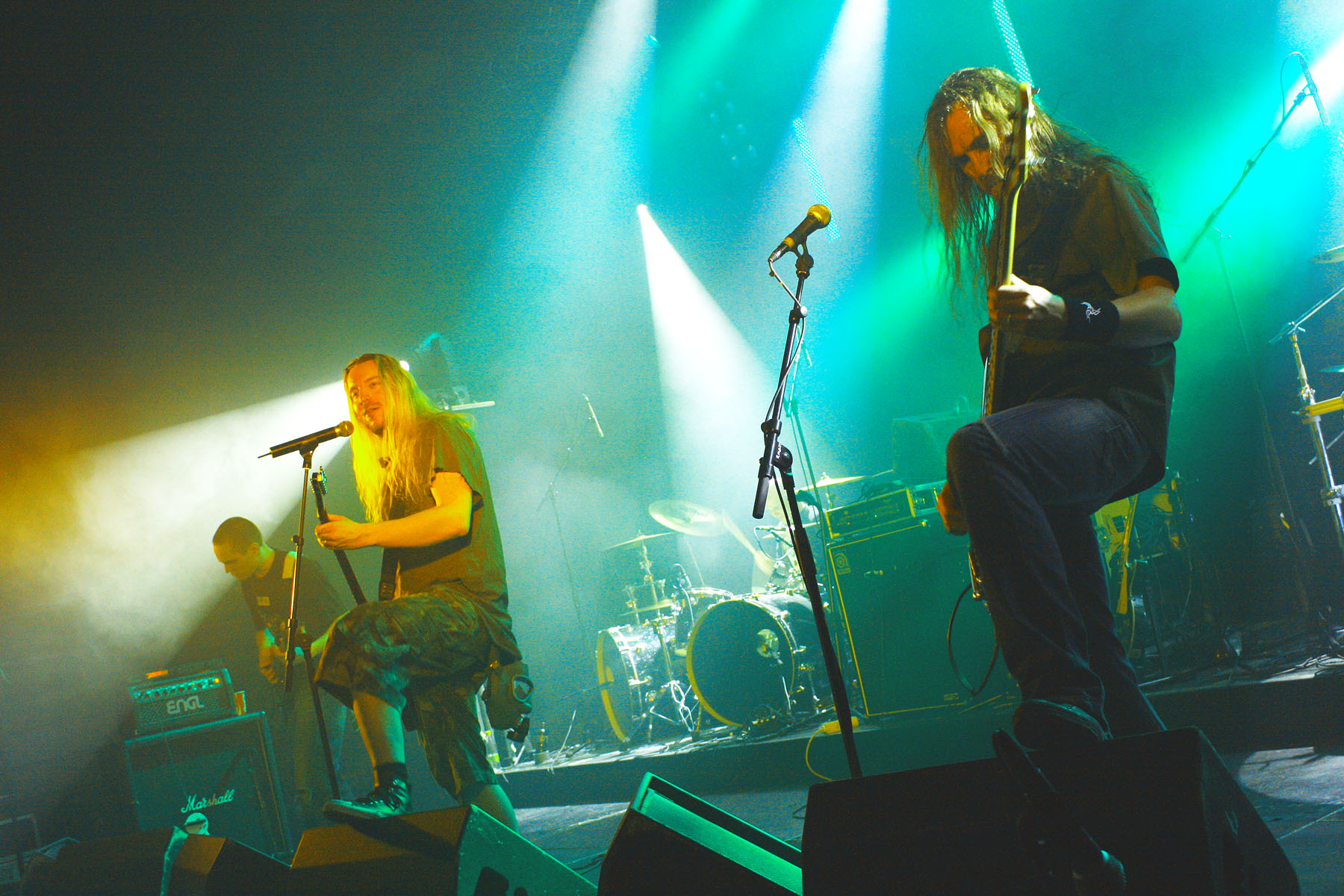
- Deuteronomium live at Immortal Metal Fest 2009

Background information
- Origin: Jyväskylä, Finland
- Genres: White metal, death 'n' roll, melodic death metal
- Years active: 1993–2001, 2006–present
- Labels: Little Rose, Bullroser
- Members: Manu Lehtinen; Miika Partala; Kalle Paju; Janne-Jussi Kontoniemi
- Past members: Jarno Lehtinen; Tapio Laakso; Jari Mantour; Johnny Pesonen

Deuteronomium is a Christian White metal band formed in 1993, Jyväskylä, Finland, one of Finland's earliest and most influential groups in that genre.

Deuteronomium are, with Immortal Souls, the only remaining bands of the first wave of Finnish Christian extreme metal currently active. Their first EP, Tribal Eagle, is, according to Ristillinen magazine, the first Finnish Christian metal CD. Tribal Eagle and debut album Street Corner Queen are noted as pieces of Christian metal history. Bassist Manu Lehtinen and guitarist/vocalist Miika Partala, also known for the bands Stoner Kings, Icon Clan, No Man's Band and Feiled, established the record label Little Rose Productions, which signed bands such as Immortal Souls. During the peak of their career, before the band split up for six years in 2001, Deuteronomium became internationally known. At one point, they headlined foreign festivals such as Seaside festival in Norway with Narnia and Newsboys as support acts. Deuteronomium was previously sponsored by Dr Pepper. Deuteronomium influenced later bands such as Ukrainian folk metallers Holy Blood. In June 2006, the band played a comeback concert as the headliner at the biggest non-alcoholic Mid Summer festival in Finland, OHM-Fest. Deuteronomium shot a DVD, Spelled Alive, of the comeback concert. In December 2006 the band officially reformed and headlined the biggest Christian metal festival in Finland, Immortal Metal Fest.

In August 2008, the band released its third album, From the Midst of the Battle, which on August 20, peaked at No. 11 on the Official Finnish Top 40 Album Chart.

== Biography ==
=== Background ===
In 1990, brothers Jarno and Manu Lehtinen were invited to play in the Kokkola band DBM (Destroyer of Black Metal), known as the first Christian extreme metal group in Finland. DBM released two demos, Death of a Soul (1990) and Slayer of Evil (1991), before the Lehtinen brothers left the band due to the distance between Laukaa and Kokkola. Aki Särkioja, who would form Immortal Souls with his brother Esa in December 1991, played in DBM for a short while until the band changed their name to Cathacomb and split up after releasing a few demos.

In 1991, Manu Lehtinen had the name and logo ready for Deuteronomium, but he formed the band with his brother Jarno until 1993. While Deuteronomium is the fifth Book of the Hebrew Bible, Deuteronomy, Lehtinen chose the name because he thought "it looked cool, is hard to spell, so it was a perfect name for a metal band!" In the beginning, their style was straightforward death metal and grindcore with Vengeance Rising, Mortification, Cannibal Corpse and Carcass as their influences. Guitarists Miika Partala and Tapio Laakso joined them. Partala was a talented guitarist. They played their first show on 3 December 1993. After that, Deuteronomium recorded their first demo tape, Paths of Righteousness, which became popular in certain circles. Between 1993 and 1994, Jarno Lehtinen and Tapio Laakso left the band. Kalle Paju (guitar) and Ali Hassinen (drums) replaced them. After some shows, Deuteronomium lost their rehearsal place. The band went on a hiatus.

=== New Era ===
In 1995, Deuteronomium reformed with Manu Lehtinen, Miika Partala, Johnny Pesonen ja Jari Mantour. Partala took over vocals. Deuteronomium recorded their second demo, Crosshope. They attended a local contest held in rock club Lutakko, Jyväskylä and played a few shows in the Jyväskylä area.

In 1996, Deuteronomium entered the Watercastle studio, where they would record most of their catalogue, and recorded their first EP, Tribal Eagle. On this EP, their style went in a death 'n' roll direction. Tribal Eagle combines melodic and old-school death metal with punk rock and black metal. "Thinking" is the only Deuteronomium song that incorporates traditional death grunt vocalization. Tribal Eagle was published as a self-financed release. The EP was well received and gained traction outside Finland. Tribal Eagle is the first Finnish Christian metal CD. Drummer Janne-Jussi Kontoniemi replaced Johnny Pesonen after the release.

=== Little Rose Productions ===
In 1998, Manu Lehtinen and Miika Partala formed a company called Little Rose Productions. They intended to give diversity to the Finnish Christian music culture by importing Christian metal CDs to Finland and sell them. Little Rose was also a record label that signed Christian metal bands. Four bands were on their roster: Deuteronomium, Immortal Souls, Lament and Mordecai. Some notable releases were Immortal Souls / Mordecai split-CD Divine Wintertime / Through the Woods, Towards the Dawn Immortal Soul's debut album Under the Northern Sky, the compilation albums From Kaamos to Mid night Sun and The Metal Rose Collection.

Later in 1998, Deuteronomium recorded their first studio album, Street Corner Queen, under their label. With this release, they wanted to pioneer and experiment with black metal and different styles such as reggae, funk metal, rap and others seldom heard in extreme metal. They tried writing without hiding their message, using bonsai trees and ravens as metaphors about social issues. The album was distributed through the label's catalogue and almost worldwide in Christian bookstores. Street Corner Queen was released on 20 May 1998. The release show was held in the rock club Lutakko with Hallowed as the support act.

In 1999, Deuteronomium entered the studio to record new material. They released the single "To Die and Gain." During that period, they changed their old logo to a simplified version. The band received a phone call from club Lutakko inquiring whether Deuteronomium could open for Sentenced – a well-known Finnish group – on February 6. It was Deuteronomium's biggest show at that point in their career. According to Deuteronomium, they were well received by the audience who had come to see Sentenced although many were surprised that Deuternomium is a Christian band when the band told about their faith. The members of Sentenced were divided in two when they heard who their support act was. Others didn't even greet them while others came to talk to Deuteronomium members during the pauses.

Their second album titled Here to Stay, released in mid-1999, saw a change in style for the band, as they transitioned from melodic death metal to a more groove-oriented sound they self-styled as "death n' roll", and maintained a more consistent sound. Often compared to later Entombed, Gorefest, Heartwork-era Carcass or 1990s material of Napalm Death, Here to Stay is a mix between melodic death metal and punk rock with a more laid-back lyrical style. Here to Stay was received somewhat better than Street Corner Queen.

Constantly playing live shows and releasing their second album, Deuteronomium became well known in Finnish metal scene as there were bizarre rumours about them. One example being: "Deuteronomium played a gig at metal bar Valhalla in Kuopio, and after the concert a member of a Finnish black metal band Barathrum stabbed their drummer with a knife." In reality, some members had been to that bar but Deuteronomium never performed there.

=== Foreign Concerts ===
In 1999 Deuteronomum had become well known enough to play foreign concerts. Deuteronomium played their first gig outside Finland on 27 June 1999 Gouda, the Netherlands at a youth church. Three days later they played at club Nighttown in Rotterdam as they opened for the Australian extreme power trio Mortification who were on their Hammer of God tour. Through Little Rose Productions, Manu Lehtinen arranged Mortification to Finland, where they played four days later at the club Tullikamarin Pakkahuone, Tampere, again with Deuteronomium as the support act.

On 25 March 2000 Deuteronomium played at Bobfest in Klubben, Sweden with some of the best known names in Christian metal: Antestor, Crimson Moonlight, Veni Domine and Sanctifica. June 30 the band returned to Rotterdam where they played at Baroeg - a famous underground metal club. Deuteronomium was the first Christian band to play there. Next day Deuteronomium travelled to Norway where they headlined Seaside festival with Narnia, Silver and Newsboys as support acts. At that point Deuteronomium had become one of the best known Christian extreme metal bands in Europe.

=== Splitting up ===
In 2000 Miika Partala announced that he was going to leave the band as did Janne-Jussi Kontoniemi. They decided to play the remaining gigs in Deuteronomium. During June 2000 they played three gigs in Germany. June 20 they played at Heavy und Biker club, Oelsnitz/Erzebirgen with death metal band Sacrificium. The black metal fans that showed up weren't pleased when they found out Deuteronomium is a Christian band. June 30 they played at club Che in Stuttgart with Sacrificium and Acoustic Torment. The third and last gig was played at the countryside of Gotha, Freakstock festival with speed/power metal band Seventh Avenue. That gig marked the end of Deuteronomium's active era.

It is notable than in 2000, Markus "Black Raven" Vainionpää won The Annual Air Guitar World Championship contest by performing Deuteronomium's song "Crosshope" - from the Tribal Eagle EP.

Deuteronomium officially split up in 2001. They released Street Corner Queen and Tribal Eagle as a digipak edition with One Bad Pig cover song of "Red River" as a bonus track. After that Manu Lehtinen Sold his Little Rose record selling business rights to Lasse Niskala and Päivi Niemi who would form Maanalainen Levykauppa - The Underground Record Store. During the years the band members went to seraparate ways. Manu Lehtinen formed a melancholic rock band called Vaskikäärme (Finnish word for Anguis fragilis) in which he sings and plays guitar. Miika Partala played in No Man's Band, Icon Clan, Stoner Kings (with ex-Hallowed vocalist and wrestling professional Michael "Starbuck" Majalahti) and Feiled.

=== Comeback ===
In 2006 a Finnish Mid Summer event, OHM-Fest, announced Deuteronomium as their headliner claiming that the band would play a one-off show. Deuteronomium played an almost two-hour set of songs with a filming team on spot. Deuteronomium stated that they would release a DVD of the gig sometime in 2007. Maanalainen Levykauppa reissued Street Corner Queen in that concert.

December 24 they announced a comeback on their website. May 19 they headlined Immortal Metal Fest with Sacrificium as the support act.

In March 2008, Deuteronomium announced that they are recording a new album for the first time since 1999's Here to Stay -album. The new album will be titled From the Midst of the Battle, and it will be released by Bulroser Records in March 2008. The album will be released in a special book cover digipak edition that will include the CD as well as a full live concert from their performance at the True Attitude event, Heinola, Finland, a studio diary, and a concert travel documentary of their performance at Elements of Rock, Switzerland. The album will feature such special guests as Christian Palin (Random Eyes), Oula Siipola (Lumina Polaris), Kristiina Holländer, Mikko Härkin (ex-Sonata Arctica, Mehida) and Claudio Enzler (Sacrificium). The last song of the album is a 10+ minute epic featuring such special instruments as kantele.

On 20 August 2008 From the Midst of the Battle peaked at number 11 on the Finnish Top 40 Charts. The album received positive reception. After the release, they performed at the Dutch Flevo Festival and had a 12 show tour in seven European countries with Immortal Souls. In April 2009 the band released a vinyl-EP titled Retaliatory Strike, featuring leftover songs from the previous recording session as well as the title cover song by the Christian thrash metal band Betrayal. Deuteronomium played at the Finnish summer metal festivals Sauna Open Air, Tampere, and DBTL, Turku. Later in 2009, for the first time in their career, Deuteronomium played outside Europe, a 9-show tour in Mexico.

In February 2011, the band announced that their next album will be titled Deathbed Poetry – Hope Against Hope. A concept album, Manu stated that it is based on a book by the English poet and priest John Donne (1572–1631) called Devotions upon Emergent Occasions.

== Band members ==
Current

- Manu Lehtinen – bass (1993–2001, 2006–present)
- Miika Partala – guitar, lead vocals (1993–2001, 2006–present)
- Kalle Paju – guitar (1994, 1997–2001, 2006–present)
- J.J. Kontoniemi – drums (1997–2001, 2006–present)

Former

- Jarno Lehtinen – drums (1993–1997)
- Tapio Laakso – guitar (1993–1994)
- Jari Mantour – guitar (1996)
- Johnny Pesonen – drums (1997)

Timeline

== Discography ==
- Paths of Righteousness demo (1993)
- Crosshope demo (1995)
- Tribal Eagle EP (1997)
- Street Corner Queen (1998)
- Here to Stay (1999)
- From the Midst of the Battle (2008)
- Retaliatory Strike EP (2009)
- Deathbed Poetry – Hope Against Hope (2011)
- The Amen (2013)

== Videography ==
- Spelled Alive (2007)
