= Mortuus Machina =

Studio album by Universum
- Released: 1 January 2011
- Recorded: 2010
- Genre: Melodic death metal
- Language: English
- Label: Riot! Entertainment
- Producer: Universum

Universum chronology
Leto Destinatus (2008)	Mortuus Machina (2011)

Mortuus Machina is the second album by Australian Metal band Universum. This album features guest contributions from many high profile musicians within the melodic death metal subgenre, including Christian Älvestam (Miseration, Solution .45, ex-Scar Symmetry), Ola Frenning (ex-Soilwork), Tommy Tuovinen (MyGRAIN), Marios Iliopoulos (Nightrage), Olof Mörck (Amaranthe), and Paul Wardingham.

== Track listing ==
All music written by Michael Soininen except where noted

No.	Title	Lyrics	Music	Length
1.	"Fractured Archetype" (featuring Christian Älvestam)	Stephen Murphy	Murphy; M. Soininen	4:23
2.	"Genetic Sequence Distortion"	M. Soininen; Murphy; Adam Soininen		4:28
3.	"Sum of The Universe" (ft. Älvestam, Olof Mörck and Marios Iliopoulos)	M. Soininen		4:25
4.	"Aeon Displacement" (ft. Paul Wardingham)	A. Soininen; Murphy		4:36
5.	"2.0" (ft. Älvestam)	M. Soininen		3:09
6.	"Slaves to the New Order"	M. Soininen		3:38
7.	"Take Another"	M. Soininen; A. Soininen; Murphy		4:38
8.	"Asymmetric Dimensional State" (ft. Tommy Tuovinen and Ola Frenning)	A. Soininen		3:59
9.	"Morte Noir"	A. Soininen		5:21
10.	"Transcendence 0.0"	A. Soininen; M. Soininen; Murphy		3:23
11.	"Blank Infinity"	M. Soininen; Murphy; A. Soininen	Murphy; Rachael Madden	6:01

== Personnel ==
=== Universum ===
- Adam Soininen - vocals
- Michael Soininen - lead/rhythm guitar, additional vocals
- Stephen Murphy - rhythm/lead guitar
- Rachael Madden - keyboards
- Jaron Soininen - drums
- Doug Clark - bass

=== Production ===
- Stephen Murphy - Producer & Recording Engineer
- Jens Bogren- Mixing/Mastering
