= Crimson Moonlight =

Swedish black metal band

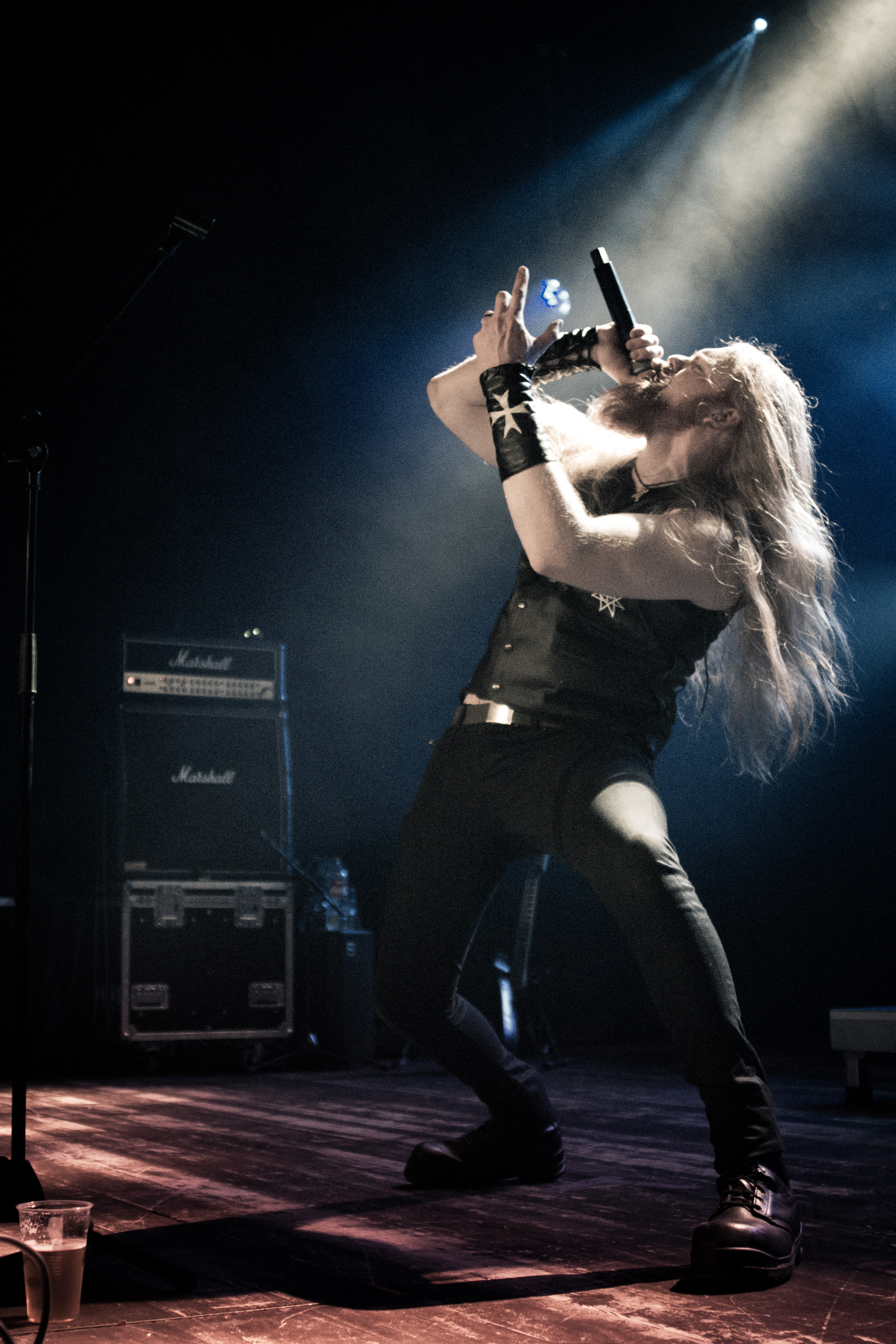
- Crimson Moonlight at Elements of Rock, 2017

Background information
- Origin: Jönköping, Sweden
- Genres: Unblack Metal; Symphonic Black Metal; Blackened Death Metal
- Years active: 1997–present
- Labels: Rivel (2003–2006); Endtime (2006–present)
- Members: Pilgrim Bestiarius XII; Gustav Elowsson; Per Sundberg; Johan Wold Ylenstrand; Rickard Gustaffson
- Website: crimsonmoonlight.com

Crimson Moonlight is a Swedish black metal band. The band was formed in the summer of 1997 with the intention of recording a primitive, old-school black metal demo and playing one show before breaking up. The breakup never happened, and they have since recorded two EPs and three full-length albums. They were previously signed to Rivel Records, currently to Endtime Productions. They have toured US twice, and have been featured in two metal documentary films.

== History ==
=== Beginning (1997–1999) ===
Simon "Pilgrim" Rosén (vocals), Gustav "Gurra" Elowsson (drums), Petter Stenmarker (guitar, keyboards), Jonathan Jansson (guitar), and Simon Lindh (bass) formed Crimson Moonlight in the summer of 1997. They recorded the demo Glorification of the Master of Light. They intended to split up after recording that demo, but decided to carry on. In the year 1998, they recorded their first studio EP, Eternal Emperor, which presented a keyboard-driven symphonic black metal style, in contrast to the more primitive, Horde-inspired music of their demo. In 1998, Crimson Moonlight released the live album Live in Varsås, and in 2001 released their second demo, Heralding the Dawn.

=== The Covenant Progress and Veil of Remembrance (2000–2006) ===
A few years later, Crimson Moonlight signed a deal with Rivel Records, a small Swedish label held by Christian Rivel. During that time, Jonathan Jansson and Simon Lindh left the band. Hubertus Liljegren, formerly of the then-split-up group Sanctifica, along with Per Sundberg, joined Crimson Moonlight as guitarists. In 2003, Crimson Moonlight recorded their first studio album, The Covenant Progress. The album went in a more melodic black metal direction with less emphasis on symphonic keyboards. The album received positive reviews from metal music media, and by 2005 it had sold 2300 copies. During 2003, Crimson Moonlight played several tours around Europe to support The Covenant Progress.

In 2004, Crimson Moonlight recorded their second album, Veil of Remembrance. The album showcased changes in the band's style. They abandoned keyboards to achieve a more brutal sound, and incorporated grindcore and brutal death metal influences into their sound, inspired by groups such as Nile, Origin, Rotten Sound, and Nasum. During the studio sessions, Jani Stefanovic (of Divinefire, Renascent, and many other bands) was in Crimson Moonlight's line-up and had a notable role in creating their new style, now called death/black metal. Like its predecessor, Veil of Remembrance was officially released on January 26, 2005, although it was already available since December 4, 2004. The album received positive reviews like its predecessor, but sold fewer copies than The Covenant Progress. In an interview with Harm magazine, the band believed that p2p-filesharing affected the low sales. They toured Europe to support the album. At the end of 2004, they released the compilation album Songs from the Archives, which included the Eternal Emperor EP, tracks from both albums, demo tracks, and live recordings.

Following this, the band went through line-up changes. Hubertus Liljegren, Jani Stefanovic, and Erik Tordsson left. Johan Ylenstrand joined as a bassist. Ylenstrand and Elowsson play in deathgrind band Exhale, which has released one album and played at a US death metal festival called Maryland Deathfest. In 2006, Elowsson was endorsed by drumming gear companies Sabian, Pearl, Remo, and Vic Firth.

=== In Depths of Dreams Unconscious (2006–2011) ===
In 2006, Crimson Moonlight's deal with Rivel Records ended and the band began searching for a new label. On June 17, 2006, extreme metal label Endtime Productions announced that they had signed Crimson Moonlight. Crimson Moonlight had recorded an EP in secrecy. During the summer, Crimson Moonlight played their first tour in the United States and sold the pre-release pressings of their new recording, In Depths of Dreams Unconscious. It featured two new songs and a re-recording of a song from their first demo. The EP continued their death/black metal direction with a more melodic setting. The official release contained an instrumental intro by Swedish neoclassical group Arcana. In Depths of Dreams Unconscious was officially released February 1, 2007. In the summer of 2007, Crimson Moonlight played at the Cornerstone Festival in Bushnell, Illinois for the second time since 2006.

=== Brief hiatus and Divine Darkness (2011–present) ===
In late 2011, after a hiatus, the band launched an official Facebook site, played at NordicFest and announced that they were working on a new album. In 2014, they released the single "The Suffering," which was part of their album Divine Darkness, released via Endtime Productions on February 26, 2016. Pilgrim stated in an interview in March 2016 that the lineup consisted of himself, Gurra, Johan Ylenstrand, and Per Sundberg. The band is currently working on a new album titled Epiklesis – Maranatha.

== Members ==
Current line-up

Members	Instruments	Years active	Other projects
Simon "Pilgrim Bestiarius XII" Rósen	Vocals	1997–present	Horde, Vital Decision, Obsecration
Per Sundberg	Guitar, Bass, Keys	2002–2009, 2011–present	
Johan Wold Ylenstrand	Guitar, Bass	2006–2009, 2011–present	Inevitable End, Vital Decision, Sordid, Sordid Death, The Weakening, Miseration
Rickard Gustafsson	Bass	2016–2019 (live), 2019–present	Pantokrator, Melech, Golden Resurrection
Gustav Elowsson	Drums	1997–present	Exhale, Antestor, Obsecration

Former members

Members	Instruments	Years active	Other projects
Joakim Malmborg	Guitar	2006–2009	Inevitable End
Hubertus Liljegren	Guitars, Bass	2002–2006	Sanctifica, Oblivion, The Malice
Samuel Lundberg	Guitars	2001–2002	
David Seiving	Bass	1999–2002	Sanctifica, As a Reminder
Petter Stenmarker	Guitars	1997–2003	Oblivion
Alexander Orest	Keyboards	1997–2001	Sanctifica
Erik Tordsson	Bass, Guitars	2004–2006	7Days, End of September
Jani Stefanovic	Guitars	2004–2006	Renascent, Divinefire, Miseration, Essence of Sorrow, Mehida, The Few Against Many, The Weakening, Solution .45, Am I Blood, Sins Of Omission, Hilastherion
Simon Lindh	Bass	1997–1999	
Jonathan Jansson	Guitars	1997–2000	Pantokrator, Sanctifica, Skogen, Litania, As a Reminder

Timeline

== Discography ==
Glorification of the Master of Light

- Released: 1997
- Format: CD/Cassette
- Label: Independent

Live in Värsås

- Released: 1998
- Format: CD
- Label: Independent

Eternal Emperor

- Released: 1998
- Format: CD
- Label: Independent

Heralding the Dawn

- Released: 2001
- Format: CD
- Label: Independent

The Covenant Progress

- Released: 2003
- Format: CD
- Label: Rivel
- Producer: Tomas Johansson

Songs from the Archives

- Released: 2003
- Format: CD
- Label: Rivel

Veil of Remembrance

- Released: 2004
- Format: CD
- Label: Rivel

In Depths of Dreams Unconscious

- Released: 2007
- Format: CD
- Label: Endtime

Divine Darkness

- Released: February 26, 2016
- Format: CD/Digital
- Label: Endtime
- Singles: The Suffering

Abaddon

- Released: 2023
- Format: CD/Digital
- Label: Endtime
- Singles: "Wings of Death"
