= Universum (band) =

Australian metal band

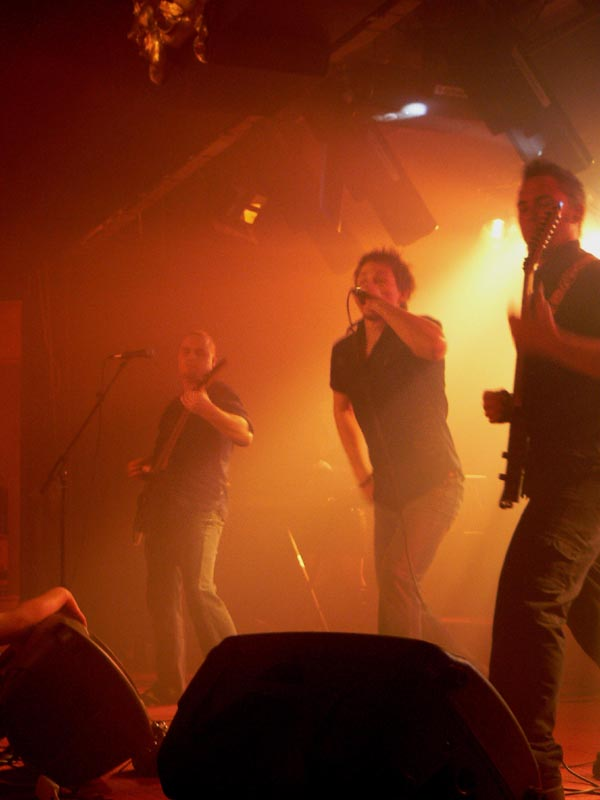
- Universum live in Australia

Background information
- Also known as: Universum
- Origin: Adelaide, Australia
- Genres: Melodic death metal, metalcore
- Years active: 2006−2012; 2018-present
- Labels: Riot
- Members: Michael Soininen; Adam Soininen; Stephen Murphy; Jaron Soininen; Rachael Madden; Doug Clark
- Past members: Liam Brophy

Universum are a heavy metal band from Adelaide, South Australia. The band completed formation in early 2007 and describe their sound a fusion of Scandinavian melodic death metal, new wave American metal, old school thrash metal and progressive metal. Universum have released two albums to date, the debut album Leto Destinatus on 15 June 2008 and their second album Mortuus Machina on 1 January 2011.

== Band history ==
Formed in early 2006, their sound was influenced by such bands as Pantera, Death, and Iron Maiden. In 2007, Universum completed an eponymous demo. Soon Liam Brophy and Rachael Madden were added to the line up. Playing a string of Australian shows, Universum entered the Emergenza Battle of the Bands competition where they came away runners up in the South Australian state final, winning 'Best Vocalist' and 'Best Guitarist' (Michael Soininen). Shortly following, the band recorded their debut album, Leto Destinatus, which was well received by critics. The album was mixed and mastered in Sweden by the renowned Jens Bogren (Opeth, Soilwork, Amon Amarth). The artwork was done by Gus Sazes, and the album featured a guest solo by Tomy Laisto from the Finnish melodeath band Mors Principium Est. Following the album's release, the band were signed by Riot Entertainment. In October 2008, Universum embarked on their first Australian national tour, with the UK's power metal band DragonForce. They have also secured 2009 shows with Cradle of Filth, Edguy, Cynic, Dark Funeral and Ensiferum. The band has featured on both the UK's Terrorizer magazine (Jan 2009, issue No. 180) and Metal Hammer's (Apr 2009, issue No. 191) covermount CDs.

On the back of releasing Leto Destinatus, Universum picked up a string of endorsements and in March 2010 Michael Soininen and Stephen Murphy were fortunate enough to be the first Australian guitarists listed on the Ibanez guitars web page artist roster.

In June 2010, the band confirmed on their Myspace page that they had parted ways with their longtime bassist Liam Brophy. He was replaced by Doug Clark.

Universum released their 2nd album Mortuus Machina intended for 15 December 2010 but pushed back to 1 January 2011, and it featured guest appearances from vocalist Christian Älvestam (ex Scar Symmetry, Miseration), vocalist Tommy Tuovinen (myGRAIN), as well as guest guitar solos from Nightrage guitarists, Marios Iliopoulos and Olof Mörck. Jens Bogren of Sweden's Fascination Street Studios (Opeth, Soilwork, Amon Amarth, Katatonia) once again handled both mixing and mastering duties.

=== Return ===
Universum stopped touring and producing new music in 2012, suggesting that they quietly disbanded. However, on 30 December 2018, they shared a demo of a new song entitled "Burdened" on their Facebook page. They have not given any indication of whether a new album is in the works.

== Members ==
=== Current members ===
- Michael Soininen - guitars and clean vocals (Since 2006)
- Stephen Murphy - guitars (Since 2006)
- Jaron Soininen - drums (Since 2006)
- Rachael Madden - keyboards (Since 2006)
- Adam Soininen - screamed vocals (Since 2007)
- Doug Clark - bass (Since 2010)

=== Former Members ===
- Liam Brophy - bass (2006–2010)

=== Guest musicians ===
Name	Contribution	Band	Additional information
Christian Älvestam	Guest vocals	Miseration, Solution .45, ex Scar Symmetry	Vocals on the tracks "Sum of the Universe, Fractured Archetype, 2.0 - (Mortuus Machina)"
Ola Frenning	Guest guitar	ex Soilwork	Lead solo on the track "Sum of the Universe - (Mortuus Machina)"
Tommy Tuovinen	Guest vocals	myGRAIN	Vocals on the track "Asymmetric Dimensional State - (Mortuus Machina)"
Marios Iliopoulos	Guest guitar	Nightrage	Lead solo on the track "Sum of the Universe - (Mortuus Machina)"
Olof Mörck	Guest guitar	Amaranthe, ex Nightrage	Lead solo on the track "Asymmetric Dimensional State - (Mortuus Machina)"
Tomy Laisto	Guest guitar	Mors Principium Est	Lead solo on the track "Ignite the Subconscious - (Leto Destinatus)"
Paul Wardingham	Guest guitar	(solo musician)	Lead solo on the track "Aeon Displacement - (Mortuus Machina)"

== Discography ==
=== Studio albums ===
Date of Release	Title	Label	Peak	Sales
15 July 2008	Leto Destinatus	Riot		
1 January 2011	Mortuus Machina			

=== Demo ===
- Self Titled (2007, demo)
