= From the Midst of the Battle =

Studio album by Deuteronomium
- Released: August 13, 2008
- Recorded: Drum Forest Studio
- Genre: Death metal
- Length: 47:18
- Label: Bullroser Records
- Producers: Mikko Härkin & Deuteronomium

Deuteronomium chronology
Here to Stay (1999)	From the Midst of the Battle (2008)

Alternative cover

From the Midst of the Battle is the third full-length album by the Finnish death metal band Deuteronomium, released on August 13, 2008, by Bullroser Records. During its release on the 34th week, From the Midst of the Battle peaked at number 11 on the Official Finnish Album Chart. The album was produced by Mikko Härkin (ex-Sonata Arctica, Mehida) and Deuteronomium.

== Recording ==
In March 2008, Deuteronomium announced that they are recording a new album for the first time since 1999's Here to Stay -album. The album was recorded during Spring 2008 in Drum Forest Studio, and the album title was announced to be From the Midst of the Battle. It was released by Bulroser Records in March 2008, and The album was pre-released in a special book cover digibook edition that will include the CD as well as a full live concert from their performance at the True Attitude event, Heinola, Finland, a studio diary, and a concert travel documentary of their performance at Elements of Rock, Switzerland. The album features such special guests as Christian Palin (Random Eyes), Oula Siipola (Lumina Polaris), Kristiina Holländer, Mikko Härkin (ex-Sonata Arctica, Mehida) and Claudio Enzler (Sacrificium). The last song of the album is a 17-minute epic featuring such special instruments as kantele. Warfare and battle are prominent themes on the album.

== Reception ==
Professional ratings
Review scores
Source	Rating
Inferno Magazine	4.5/5 stars
Imperiumi.net	link

On July 24, 2008, several songs from the album were played at the established Finnish heavy metal music radioshow Metalliliitto, and the radio host Matti Riekki commented: "I could announce this as one of the best albums of the year." Several songs were also played on the Finnish Radio Rock station.

From the Midst of the Battle peaked at number 11 on the Official Finnish Album Chart in 34th week. The next week it was at number 16. Also in 34th week the album was on number 6 on Finnish rock music magazine Rumba's Album Chart that lists the sales numbers of over 30 stores that specialize in selling records. Following the release, the band was featured in the Finnish heavy metal music magazine Inferno's issue #59, and the album scored 4.5 points out of 5 in the review, achieving commendations for the "killer riffs" and J.J. Kontoniemi's drum playing. Out of all the reviews in the magazine, only one other album achieved as high points.

On September 4, the biggest Finnish heavy metal music site Imperiumi.net chose From the Midst of the Battle for "Record of the Week" status. The reviewer gave the album 8.5 points out of 10 and wrote:

Sometimes the band's sense of melody is close to excellence, experience is apparent and feels while listening to the record. Metallic values stand out greatly in the music, and the song material is admirably solid and deliberated, and the riffs are not just arranged one after the other. There is an enjoyable amount of death metal-esque riffs, and the production stays strong throughout the record. There is nothing really original here, but a well-done thrashing, by no means ripped off from others, simply works. The 17 minute album closer, "Tales from the Midst of the Battle," with its epic take and twists keeps the listener occupied, and ending the song feels like a crime.

— Tero Lassila of Imperiumi.net on the album on September 3, 2008.

== Track listing ==
1. Fields of War (5:20)
2. 3:16 (4:00)
3. Defending the Faith (4:13)
4. Song of the Saved (2:07)
5. Lost Indeed, (3:44)
6. Hail to the King (2:58)
7. A Thorn Through Your Flesh (2:41)
8. Holy War, Holy Violence (4:58)
9. Tales from the Midst of the Battle (17:19)

== Personnel ==
- Miika Partala – vocals, guitar
- Manu Lehtinen – bass
- Kalle Paju – guitar
- Janne-Jussi Kontoniemi – drums
