= Jani Stefanovic =

Swedish musician

- Born: 23 May 1979 (age 46)
- Origin: Sweden
- Genres: Heavy metal, extreme metal, power metal, progressive metal, symphonic metal, death metal
- Occupation(s): Musician, songwriter
- Instrument(s): Guitar, drums, keyboards, bass, vocals
- Years active: 1999–present

Jani Stefanovic (born 23 May 1979) is a Swedish multi-instrumentalist who primarily plays Swedish death metal. He started playing around the age of 13–14 years old.

== Personal life ==
Jani was born in Gothenburg to a Finnish mother and a Serbian father. He moved to Helsinki, Finland in 1993 with his mom, little brother and sister. Jani lived in Finland until 2000. Jani moved back to Gothenburg, Sweden in 2000. After joining Sins of omission in 2002 he moved to Stockholm. Jani is an educated chef. Jani Stefanovic is married to fellow artist Katja Stefanovic a singer songwriter from Finland. They have one daughter.

== Bands ==
Current

- Divinefire – Drums, Guitars, Keyboards (2004–present)
- Miseration – Guitar (2006–2010, 2011–present)
- Essence of Sorrow – Guitar (2005–present)
- Mehida – Guitar (2007–present)
- The Few Against Many – Drums (2008–present)
- The Weakening – Guitar (2007–present)

Former

- Am I Blood – Drums (1999–2000)
- Sins Of Omission – Drums (2002–2003)
- Renascent – Drums, Vocals (2003–2005)
- Crimson Moonlight – Guitars (2004–2006)
- Hilastherion – Drums (session) (2007)
- Solution .45 – Guitar (2007–2010, 2011–2017, 2019-2024)

== Discography ==
Renascent

- Demon's Quest (2004)
- Through Darkness (2005)

Divinefire

- Glory Thy Name (2004) (Rivel Records)
- Hero (2005) (Rivel Records)
- Into a New Dimension (2006) (Rivel Records)
- Farewell (2008) (Rivel Records)
- Eye Of The Storm (2011) (Liljegren Records)

Miseration

- Your Demons – Their Angels (2007) (Rivel Records)
- The Mirroring Shadow (2009) (Lifeforce Records)
- Tragedy Has Spoken (2012) (Lifeforce Records)
- Black Miracles and Dark Wonders (2022) (Massacre Records)

Crimson Moonlight

- Veil of Remembrance (2004) (Rivel Records)

Mehida

- Blood & Water (2007)
- The Eminent Storm (2009)

The Few Against Many

- SOT (2009) (Pulverised Records)

Solution .45

- For Aeons Past (2010) (AFM Records)
- Nightmares in the Waking State: Part I (2015)
- Nightmares in the Waking State: Part II (2016)

Production

- Glory Thy Name by Divinefire (2004)
- Hero by Divinefire (2005)
- Through Darkness by Renascent (2005)
- Into a New Dimension by Divinefire (2006)
- Reflections of the Obscure by Essence of Sorrow (2006)
- Invisible by Random Eyes (2008)
- The Light by ReinXeed (2008)
- Farewell by Divinefire (2008)
- The Mirroring Shadow by Miseration (2009)
- For Aeons Past by Solution .45 (2010)
- Eye of the Storm by Divinefire (2011)
- Tragedy Has Spoken by Miseration (2012)
- Incarnate by Pantokrator (2014)
- In the Shadow of the Inverted Cross by Sorcerer (2015)
- Black EP by Sorcerer (2015)
- Malevolent Creature of Kings by The Malice (2016)
- The Avowal of the Centurion by Sacrificium (2019)
- The Unholy Communion by The Malice (2019)
- "Crossroads" by Pantokrator (2020)
