= Angel of Sodom =

Finnish thrash metal band

- Origin: Helsinki, Finland
- Genre: Thrash metal
- Years active: 2009–present
- Label: Marquee
- Members: Michael Majalahti; Eero Tertsunen; Joonas Heikkinen
- Website: angelofsodom.com

Angel of Sodom is a thrash metal band that originated out of Helsinki, Finland. The band was created in 2009, founded by Eero Tertsunen, who also performs in Renascent, and Michael Majalahti. The band has released one studio album in 2015 and an EP in 2016. In 2016, the band went on a hiatus, due to Tertsunen moving to Bloomington, Indiana in the United States.

== History ==
The project was created by Eero Tertsunen on guitars and Michael Majalahti on vocals. Majalahti and Tertsunen began writing new music and over the course of several years, eventually wrote and recorded a full-length album, which was titled Divine Retribution, which was very well received. The album featured Rolf Pilve of Stratovarius on drums. Following the album, however, the band hoped to perform live and Pilve was unable to commit to live performances, leading them to hire on Joonas Heikkinen.

Tertsunen had performed with Heikkinen in a brutal death metal band called Kremator in the early 2000s, with Heikkinen later joining Tertsunen's band Renascent as the official drummer. In April 2, 2016, the band recorded an EP titled Heavens Ablaze, which featured two songs. In 2016, Tertsunen announced that he would be moving to Bloomington, Indiana in the United States, and the band would no longer be able to perform live. However, he returned to play two final live shows in July that year, with the band hiring on Jonne Kytölä to perform bass. The band is currently inactive, while the members continue on with their individual efforts, with Majalahti to continue working in his wrestling career as "StarBuck", Tertsunen joining the blackened death metal band Symphony of Heaven, and Heikkinen briefly performed with the black metal band Temple of Perdition.

== Members ==
Current

Members	Instruments	Years active	Other projects
Michael Majalahti	Vocals	2009–present	Stoner Kings, Hallowed, Widescreen Mode, Crossfyre
Eero Tertsunen	Guitars (2009–present), bass (2009–2016)	2009–present	Renascent, Symphony of Heaven, The Slave Eye, Kremator, The Unworthy, Kataplexia, Megiddon, Mehida, Beyond Belief, Kastimonia
Joonas Heikkinen	Drums	2014–present	Renascent, Temple of Perdition, The Slave Eye, Kremator

Live

Members	Instruments	Years active	Other projects
Jonne Kytölä	Bass	2016	

Session

Members	Instruments	Years active	Other projects
Rolf Pilve	Drums	2012	Stratovarius, Solution .45, Miseration, Dreamtale, Status Minor, The Dark Element, Code for Silence, Beyond the Dream, Amoth, Megiddon, Essence of Sorrow, Sightless, Random Eyes, Nordjärvi, Full Scale Conflict, Division of the Spoils, Reversion, Smackbound, The Hypothesis, The Magnificent

== Discography ==
Studio albums

- Divine Retribution (2015)

EPs

- Heavens Ablaze (2016)
