= Renascent (band) =

Finnish unblack metal band

- Origin: Helsinki, Finland
- Genres: Unblack metal, Christian metal, death metal, Thrash metal
- Years active: 2003-2005, 2014-present
- Labels: Maamalainen Levykauppa, Metal Union
- Members: Eero Tertsunen; Mikaela Akrenius; Voitto Rintala; Joonas Heikkinen
- Past members: Jani Stefanovic; Barry Halldan; Markus Saarela
- Website: Renascent on Facebook

Renascent is a Finnish unblack metal band from Helsinki. The core of the band now reside in Bloomington, Indiana. The band has released the EP Demon's Quest in 2004 and the album Through Darkness in 2005. The band released their sophomore album, Praise of the Lord God Almighty, on 5 November 2016. The band is openly Christian. The band has been compared to Dimmu Borgir and Old Man's Child.

== History ==
Renascent started in 2003 with drummer Jani Stefanovic meeting guitarist Eero Tertsunen and keyboardist Mikaela Akrenius. They named the band the same week bassist Voitto Rintala joined. In Summer 2004, the band hired singer Barry Hilliden and recorded their debut release, Demon's Quest. In 2005, the band released Through Darkness and soon after, Stefanovic and Hilliden departed the band. Stefanovic formed Miseration with former Scar Symmetry vocalist Christian Älvestam. The band remained inactive until around 2014, when they started recording a new album. The album was scheduled for release in 2016 with Tertsunen on vocals and guitar, Rintala on bass, Akrenius on keyboards, and new drummer Markus Saarela. The album, Praise of the Lord God Almighty, was released on 5 November 2016.

== Discography ==
Studio albums

- Through Darkness (2005)
- Praise to the Lord God Almighty (2016)

EPs

- Demon's Quest (2004)

== Members ==
Current

- Eero Tertsunen - guitar (2003–present), vocals (2003–2004, 2005–present) (Angel of Sodom, The Slave Eye, Symphony of Heaven, The UnWorthy)
- Voitto Rintala - bass (2003–present)
- Mikaela Akrenius - keyboards (2003–present)
- Joonas Heikkinen - drums (2014–present) (Angel of Sodom, The Slave Eye, ex-Temple of Perdition)

Former

- Jani Stefanović - drums, vocals (Divinefire, ex-Crimson Moonlight) (2003–2005)
- Barry Halldan - vocals (ex-Darkend) (2004–2005)
- Markus Saarela - drums (2005–2007)

Touring

- Carlos Osnaya - guitar (2018–present) (ex-Temple of Perdition, The UnWorthy, Exousia)
- Pekka Taina - guitar (2005) (Sáwol, ex-Sotahuuto)

Session

- Rolf Pilve - drums (2016) (Stratovarius)

Timeline
