= The Covenant Progress =

Studio album by Crimson Moonlight
- Released: March 14, 2003
- Recorded: January–February 2003 at Dream Factory and Studio Resound
- Genre: Unblack metal, symphonic black metal
- Length: 50:13
- Label: Rivel Records
- Producer: Tomas Johansson and Crimson Moonlight

Crimson Moonlight chronology
| Heralding the Dawn (2001) | The Covenant Progress (2003) | Songs from the Archives (2003) |

The Covenant Progress is the first full-length album by the Swedish group Crimson Moonlight. The album was released in 2003 on Rivel Records. In 2010, HM Magazine ranked it #52 on the Top 100 Christian metal albums of all time list with Beck stating that it is "Well-produced symphonic black metal that rivals the best any other band (Christian or secular) in this subgenre can offer."

== Recording history ==
The Covenant Progress was recorded at Dream Factory by Carl Johan Grimmark and at Studio Resound by Tomas Johansson in January and February 2003. The album was produced by Tomas Johansson and Crimson Moonlight. The Covenant Progress was mastered at Criteria Mastering by Tomas Johansson. The album was released March 14, 2003.

While the album still contains some keyboards, the musical direction went for a more melodic black metal style from the previous EP. "Eternal Emperor" is a revised version of that EP's title song. The lyrics talk poetically about Scandinavian wintery landscapes. "The Covenant" is an atmospheric, instrumental keyboard-driven song.

The Covenant Progress received a positive reception and several magazines and online sites gave it good reviews. For example, the biggest Finnish metal music website Imperiumi.net credits the band for "playing black metal better than most of their anti-Christian colleagues." The same reviewer writes that the debut album "The Covenant Progress may not be a masterpiece but it is still damn good melodic black metal." By 2005 the album had sold over 2300 copies, making it the bands by far most successful release.

== Track listing ==
| No. | Title | Length |
|---|---|---|
| 1. | "Mist of the Spiritual Dimension" | 04:11 |
| 2. | "The Pilgrimage" | 05:29 |
| 3. | "Path of Pain" | 07:32 |
| 4. | "Thy Wilderness" | 06:35 |
| 5. | "Eternal Emperor" (revised version) | 03:48 |
| 6. | "A Painting in Dark" | 04:52 |
| 7. | "Eyes of Beauty" | 04:48 |
| 8. | "A Thorn in My Heart" | 05:55 |
| 9. | "The Covenant" | 07:03 |
| Total length: | | 50:13 |

== Personnel ==
- Simon “Pilgrim” Rosén – vocals
- Petter Stenmarker – guitar, vocals
- Per Sundberg – guitar
- Hubertus Liljegren – bass, vocals
- Gustav Elowsson – drums
