= Mikko Härkin =

Finnish power metal keyboardist (born 1979)

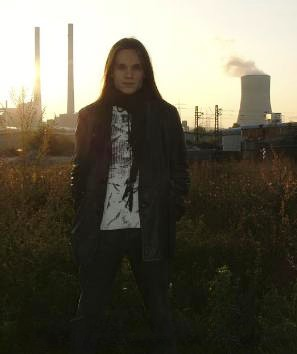
- Mikko Härkin

Background information
- Birth name: Mikko Härkin
- Born: 25 May 1979 (age 46)
- Origin: Kuopio, Finland
- Genres: Power metal, Melodic death metal
- Occupation: Musician
- Instrument: Keyboards
- Years active: 1999–present

Mikko Härkin (born 25 May 1979 in Kuopio, Finland) is a Finnish power metal keyboardist, who has performed with Sonata Arctica and Kenziner.

== History ==
Härkin begun to study piano at the age of 5. He joined Kenziner in 1998 and with them recorded his first album, The Prophecies.

In 2000, he joined Sonata Arctica and toured Europe with Stratovarius and Rhapsody. Härkin recorded keyboards for Sonata Arctica's second album, Silence, which was released in 2001. Sonata Arctica's first live CD, named Songs of Silence, featured Härkin on keyboards. At the end of 2002, Härkin left Sonata Arctica.

In 2003, Härkin started a band named Wingdom with vocalist Sami Asp, Alessandro Lotta (ex-Rhapsody), Markus Niemispelto, and guitarist Jukka Ruotsalainen. In 2005, Wingdom' released their first album, Reality. Afterwards, the band Divinefire invited Härkin to play keyboards on the album Hero.

Härkin joined Jani Stefanovic's band Essence of Sorrow with Mats Leven (Vocals), Christian Palin (singer for Random Eyes on vocals). In January 2007, they released their first album, Reflections From The Obscure.

Since 2006 Härkin has been working on a project titled Mehida. He worked on Solution .45's debut album For Aeons Past, alongside Jani Stefanovic and ex-Scar Symmetry vocalist Christian Älvestam.

In 2010 Härkin joined Symfonia, a power metal supergroup with André Matos, Timo Tolkki, Jari Kainulainen and Uli Kusch. The band made their debut performance at Finnish Metal Expo 2011, but broke up later that year.

In 2012, Härkin joined Luca Turilli's Rhapsody as a live member.

In 2021, he joined in a Timo Tolkki's solo project.

== Discography ==
- Kenziner – Prophecies (1999)
- Sonata Arctica – Silence (2001)
- Sonata Arctica – Orientation (EP) (2001)
- Sonata Arctica – Songs of Silence (2002)
- Sonata Arctica – Takatalvi (EP) (2003)
- Divinefire – Hero (2005)
- Wingdom – Reality (2006)
- Essence of Sorrow – Reflections from the Obscure (2007)
- Mehida – Blood & Water (2007)
- Cain's Offering – Gather the Faithful (2009)
- Solution .45 – For Aeons Past (2010)
- Symfonia – In Paradisum (2011)
- Avalon (Finnish band) – The Land of New Hope (2013)
