= Error in Evolution =

Studio album by One Man Army and the Undead Quartet
- Released: March 9, 2007
- Recorded: Deadline studios October–December 2006
- Genre: Melodic death metal, Thrash metal
- Length: 39:53
- Label: Nuclear Blast

One Man Army and the Undead Quartet chronology
21st Century Killing Machine (2006)	Error in Evolution (2007)	Grim Tales (2008)

Professional ratings
Review scores
Source	Rating
Allmusic	3/5 stars
Metal Hammer	6/10 stars

Error in Evolution is the second album by Swedish death/thrash metal band One Man Army and the Undead Quartet.

== Track listing ==
1. "Mine for the Taking" – 3:53 (Mikael Lagerblad, Johan Linstrand)
2. "Knights in Satan's Service" – 3:14 (Lagerblad, Linstrand)
3. "Such A Sick Boy" – 3:59 (Linstrand)
4. "The Supreme Butcher" – 2:57 (Lagerblad, Linstrand)
5. "The Sun Never Shines: – 4:03 (Lagerblad, Linstrand)
6. "See Them Burn" – 5:10 (Lindstrand, Pekka Kiviaho)
7. "Nightmare in Ashes and Blood" – 4:52 (Lindstrand)
8. "He's Back (The Man Behind the Mask)" – 3:45 (Alice Cooper, Kane Roberts, Thomas F. Kelly)
9. "Heaven Knows No Pain" – 4:45 (Lindstrand, Liviaho)
10. "Hail the King" – 3:15 (Lindstrand, Kiviaho)

== Personnel ==
- Robert Axelsson - Bass
- Marek Dobrowolski - Drums
- Johan Lindstrand - Vocals
- Pekka Kiviaho - Rhythm Guitar
- Mikael Lagerblad - Lead Guitar
- Christian Älvestam - Additional vocals on "He's Back (The Man Behind the Mask)"
