= Skin and Bones (Lyriel album) =

Studio album by Lyriel
- Released: 26 September 2014
- Genre: Folk rock, Celtic rock, gothic metal, symphonic metal
- Label: AFM

Lyriel chronology
Leverage (2012)	Skin and Bones (2014)

Skin and Bones is the fifth studio album by the German band Lyriel. Containing a mix of folk rock, gothic metal and symphonic metal, it was recorded without former band member Steffen Feldmann and published in September 2014.

== Style ==
Skin and Bones has been described as more powerful and harder than the band's previous releases. The musical genres include folk rock and celtic rock as well as gothic and symphonic metal. Swedish vocalist Christian Älvestam contributed harsh vocals as a guest singer on the track "Black and white".

== Reception ==
Professional ratings
Review scores
Source	Rating
Rock Hard	6.0/10

According to the Sonic Seducer, Lyriel had managed to combine the emotional aspects of the various tracks on Skin and Bones with a pressing sound, which was harder than their earlier albums. The reviewer noted singer Jessica Thierjung's skills and concluded that the album had been produced well. Also the Rock Hard magazine stated that Lyriel had now learned from past criticism that their sound was lacking harder components. At the same time though the reviewer remarked that the band had not yet gotten rid of kitschy and "arbitrary" songs.

== Track listing ==
All music is composed by Linda Laukamp, Tim Sonnenstuhl, Oliver Thierjung

No.	Title	Length
1.	"Numbers"	4:45
2.	"Falling Skies"	4:45
3.	"Skin and Bones"	4:02
4.	"Black and White" (feat. Christian Älvestam)	4:45
5.	"Days Had Just Begun"	4:17
6.	"Your Eyes"	3:57
7.	"Dust to Dust"	3:34
8.	"Der Weg [The Path]"	3:34
9.	"Astray"	3:11
10.	"Worth the Fight"	3:35
11.	"Running in Our Blood"	4:40
12.	"Dream Within a Dream"	5:21
13.	"Black and White (Second Skin Version)"	4:44

== Personnel ==
The production personnel for Skin and Bones include the following:

Lyriel

- Jessica Thierjung – vocals
- Tim Sonnenstuhl – guitars
- Joon Laukamp – violin
- Oliver Thierjung – bass, backing vocals
- Marcus Fidorra – drums
- Linda Laukamp – cello, backing vocals

Additional personnel

- Christian Älvestam – vocals on "Black and white"
- Hiko – cover art, layout
- Thomas Plec Johansson – mixing
- Robert Schuller – acoustic guitar
- Sebastian Sonntag – backing vocals
- Alexander Wenk – backing vocals
- Martin Ahman – keyboards and fx
