= Christian Älvestam =

Swedish musician

- Born: 14 April 1976 (age 49); Sweden
- Origin: Skövde, Sweden
- Genres: Melodic death metal; progressive metal; progressive rock; death metal; thrash metal; power metal; grindcore
- Occupation: Musician
- Instruments: Vocals; guitar; drums; bass
- Years active: 1993–present
- Member of: Miseration
- Formerly of: Solution .45; Scar Symmetry; Torchbearer; Quest of Aidance; Unmoored

Christian Älvestam (born 14 April 1976) is a Swedish vocalist, guitarist, bassist and drummer for several bands from Sweden. He is, however, best known as the former vocalist for the Swedish melodic death metal band Scar Symmetry. He currently performs with several bands, including Solution .45, Miseration, Cipher System, Svavelvinter, Ill-Wisher, Pre-Human Vaults and has made several guest appearances for other music bands. He is most known in the metal community for possessing both an extreme clean singing range and an ability to make powerful growls.

== Discography ==
=== Scar Symmetry ===
- Symmetric in Design (2005)
- Pitch Black Progress (2006)
- Holographic Universe (2008)

=== Unmoored ===
- Cimmerian (1999)
- Kingdoms of Greed (2000)
- Indefinite Soul Extension (2003)

=== Solution .45 ===
- For Aeons Past (2010)
- Nightmares in the Waking State I (2015)
- Nightmares in the Waking State II (2016)

=== Svavelvinter ===
- Nidingsverk EP (2014)
- Mörkrets Tid (2018)

=== Miseration ===
- Your Demons, Their Angels (2006)
- The Mirroring Shadow (2009)
- Tragedy Has Spoken (2012)
- Black Miracles and Dark Wonders (2022)

=== Pre-Human Vaults ===
- Allegiance Divine (EP) (2022)

=== Solo work ===
Self 2.0

EP by Christian Älvestam
- Released: 19 October 2012
- Genre: Rock, progressive rock, pop
- Length: 26:38 (Digital version) 38:34 (CD version) 43:23 (Vinyl version)
- Label: Pivotal Rockordings LLC
- Producer: Christian Alvestam

In addition to his current bands, Christian has also released an EP called Self 2.0, written and produced completely by him. Unlike his traditional work, the album consists entirely of clean vocals. In more detail, Christian explains

"It's not exactly a secret that I have a weak spot for more pop-oriented stuff - especially in the vein of the sound of the '80s," he says. "In fact, I have always been listening to softer music, alongside the heavier stuff, which is probably why my own music so often, unintentionally, tend to end up being a mixture of the two. I simply can't help myself when it comes to merging the aforesaid styles together, it seems. I'd like to call it unavoidable influence, as a direct result of having been indoctrinated with both, from childhood upwards. With that said, fighting against it is not an easy thing, whether you want to or not. At the same time, some would call it a mixed blessing, I guess. Anyhow, I have wanted to do something a bit different from what I usually do for a long time now and that is to make an all-stripped-down and laid-back album, where I use my clean vocals only. You who have followed me since the early days know I've made brief digressions, musically, of that sort before, like the 'Final State' trilogy (UNMOORED) and 'Lethean Tears' (SOLUTION .45), to name a few, so it's not like 'Self 2.0' is me heading out into completely unexplored territory. I've been there before, grubbing in its periphery. Then again, I guess you could see 'Self 2.0' as me going all the way for the first time, if you like!

The album was released on 19 October 2012.

==== Self 2.0 track listing ====
No.	Title	Length
1.	"Once Adreamed"	5:38
2.	"Time to Let Go"	4:42
3.	"Departure Theme" (CD version only, or on the "Departure Theme" single on iTunes)	5:16
4.	"Origins"	4:31
5.	"City of Sand Castles" (CD version only, or on the "Departure Theme" single on iTunes)	6:40
6.	"The Unforsaken"	5:47
7.	"En Knippa Ljung"	6:00
8.	"Waiting Out the Storm" (Vinyl version only, or on the "Waiting Out the Storm" single on iTunes)	4:49
Total length:		43:23

=== Others bands ===
- Atoma
- Cipher System
- Ill-Whisher
- Torchbearer
- The Few Against Many
- Quest of Aidance
- Incapacity
- Solar Dawn
- Syconaut

== Guest appearances ==
- Angel Blake – Clean vocals on the track "Defenseless" from The Descended.
- Bloodbath – Harsh vocals on the track "Iesous" from The Fathomless Mastery.
- Deadlock – Clean vocals on the track "Dying Breed" from Manifesto.
- Demon Hunter – Harsh and clean vocals on the track "Just Breathe" from The World Is a Thorn.
- Disarmonia Mundi – Harsh and clean vocals on the track "Ringside Seat to Human Tragedy" from the 2011 reissue of "Mind Tricks" and Clean vocals on the track "The Loneliness Of The Long Distance Runner" from the 2015 album "Cold Inferno".
- Feelingless - Harsh and clean vocals on the track "Hope".
- Henrik B – Clean vocals on the track "Now and Forever".
- Lowbringer – Clean vocals, guitar, drums, and programming on the track "Planting a New Sun"
- Lyriel – Clean and harsh vocals on the track "Black and White" from Skin and Bones.
- Monotheist - Harsh vocals on the track "The Grey King" from "Scourge" (2018).
- Night Crowned - Clean and harsh vocals on the track "Rex Tenebrae" from "Hädanfärd" (2021).
- Nuclear Blast All-Stars: Out of the Dark – Harsh and clean vocals on the track "The Overshadowing".
- One Man Army and the Undead Quartet - Clean vocals on the track "He's Back (The Man Behind the Mask)" from "Error in Evolution"
- Sight of Emptiness – Clean vocals on the tracks "Fearless", "Deception", and "Hostility" from Instincts.
- The Project Hate MCMXCIX – Clean vocals on the tracks "You Come to Me Through Hell" and "The Locust Principles" from The Lustrate Process and "Summoning Majestic War" from Bleeding The New Apocalypse (Cum Victriciis In Manibus Armis).
- Universum – Harsh and clean vocals on the tracks "Fractured Archetype", "Sum of the Universe", and "2.0" from Mortuus Machina.
- Zonaria – Clean vocals on the track "Attending Annihilation" from Infamy and the Breed.
