= In Depths of Dreams Unconscious =

EP by Crimson Moonlight
- Released: February 1, 2007
- Genre: Unblack metal
- Length: 14:29
- Label: Endtime Productions
- Producers: Pelle Saether and Crimson Moonlight

Crimson Moonlight chronology
| Veil of Remembrance (2004) | In Depths of Dreams Unconscious (2007) | Divine Darkness (2016) |

In Depths of Dreams Unconscious is an EP by the Swedish death/black metal group Crimson Moonlight, released in 2007 on Endtime Productions.

== Recording ==
In Depths of Dreams Unconscious was recorded in Spring 2006 at Studio Underground, produced by Pelle Saether and Crimson Moonlight. Before recording, the band announced that they would not continue co-operation with Rivel Records, and the recording was kept in secret until early Summer of 2006 when the Swedish label Endtime Productions announced the signing of Crimson Moonlight. The press release stated that Crimson Moonlight would tour US that Summer. For the tour, Endtime produced an unofficial limited edition pre-release of the EP. While performing in US, Crimson Moonlight sold 2 different versions on the EP: the first one included a 1-page cover picture of the crow in ochre color; the second one included only the CD with jewelcase, no booklet.

After the tour Endtime Productions announced the official black and white cover art for In Depths of Dreams Unconscious, with its official release date set for February 1, 2007. A so-called Art Folder Edition of the EP, limited to 50 copies, was released at the same time. In Depths of Dreams Unconscious: Artbook Edition was a handmade edition that contained the CD in large black cardboard folder together with a selection of concept photos. The official edition contains the band logo in a sticker attached to the jewelcase.

== Overview ==
The official edition of In Depths of Dreams Unconscious includes the eponymous intro composed by Peter Bjärgö and the neoclassical group Arcana, a musical group signed to Cold Meat Industry label. The intro showcases influences of medieval music.

The EP includes two new Crimson Moonlight songs, "The Advent of the Grim Hour" and "Shiver of Fear". Musically, they continue the band's grindcore influenced death/black metal style heard on the previous 2005 album Veil of Remembrance, but with more focus on melody and increased technicality in some parts. The production improved on In Depths of Dreams Unconscious compared to the band's previous releases. Half of the vocals are guttural death growls, mostly performed by bass player Johan Ylenstrand, contrasted with black metal shrieking by Simon Rosén. The lyrics are more philosophical than previous work and songs comment on the essence of fear ("Shiver of Fear") and spiritual struggle ("The Advent of the Grim Hour").

"Alone in Silence" is a re-written version of a song with the same title from Crimson Moonlight's first demo, Glorification of the Master of Light. It is an old school black metal song with a melodic undercurrent.

== Track listing ==
1. "In Depths of Dreams Unconscious" - 02:20
2. "The Advent of the Grim Hour" - 05:01
3. "Shiver of Fear" - 04:43
4. "Alone in Silence" - 02:25

== Personnel ==
- Simon "Pilgrim" Rosén – vocals
- Per Sundberg – guitar
- Gustav "Gurra" Elowsson – drums
- Johan Ylenstrand – bass, additional vocals
- Erik Tordsson – guitar
