= Leto Destinatus =

Studio album by Universum
- Released: (Australia) 15 July 2008
- Recorded: March 2008 at House of SAP, Adelaide, Australia
- Genre: Melodic death metal
- Length: 51:23
- Label: Riot!
- Producer: Universum

Universum chronology
Leto Destinatus (2008)	Mortuus Machina (2011)

Leto Destinatus is the debut album by Australian metal band, Universum. This album was mixed and mastered by Jens Bogren of Sweden's Fascination Street Studios and is available through Australia's largest heavy music distributor Riot Entertainment, which the band is also signed to.

== Track listing ==
All music written by Michael Soininen except where noted.

No.	Title	Lyrics	Music	Length
1.	"Leto Destinatus"	Adam Soininen		3:49
2.	"Day of Redemption"	A. Soininen		5:25
3.	"Disconnected"	A. Soininen		5:08
4.	"Solitude"	Stephen Murphy		1:32
5.	"Damage"	Murphy	Murphy	2:52
6.	"Invisible Scars"	M. Soininen		3:12
7.	"War of Ages"	M. Soininen		3:09
8.	"False Paradigm"	M. Soininen/Murphy		4:24
9.	"Zero"	M. Soininen	Murphy	4:06
10.	"Faded"	M. Soininen		3:22
11.	"Black Logic"	M. Soininen	Murphy	4:39
12.	"Misery Cell"	M. Soininen/Murphy	Murphy	4:45
13.	"Ignite the Subconscious" (feat. Tomy Laisto of Mors Principium Est)	A. Soininen		3:49

== Credits ==
=== Universum ===
- Adam Soininen – harsh vocals
- Michael Soininen – lead and rhythm guitar, clean vocals
- Jaron Soininen – drums
- Stephen Murphy – rhythm and lead guitar
- Liam Brophy – bass
- Rachael Madden - keyboards

=== Guest musicians ===
- Tomy Laisto - guest guitar

=== Production ===
- Jens Bogren - Mixing/Mastering
- Universum - Producer
- Artwork by Gus (Sonic Syndicate, Firewind)
