= Paul Wardingham =

- Genres: Instrumental, cyber metal, industrial metal, melodic death metal, progressive metal, math metal
- Instruments: Music sequencer, samplers, 7-String Guitar, synthesizer
- Years active: 2006–present
- Label: Enigmatic Records
- Website: www.paulwardingham.com

Paul Wardingham is an English-born Australian musician. Self-described as "instrumental cyber metal" his style can be categorized as a hybrid mix of rock, progressive metal with electronic elements. He is currently signed to Enigmatic Records

As of February 2018 Paul is endorsed by Kiesel Guitars.

== Biography ==
Paul Wardingham was born in the UK where he learned guitar and became exposed to blues and jazz fusion. He currently resides in Launceston, Australia where he performed in "The Collins/Wardingham Project", a progressive metal fusion band. In 2006, the group released the album Interactive.

Paul later contributed guitar instrumentals for "Aeon Displacement" in the 2011 Mortuus Machina album by the Australian melodic death metal band Universum.

As of 2010, Paul has operated as a solo artist, releasing four albums as of October 2018: Assimilate Regenerate, The Human Affliction, Spiritual Machines and Electromancer

== Assimilate Regenerate (2011) ==
Released in 2011, the instrumental concept album Assimilate Regenerate was inspired by "science fiction, future technology and the effect it has on society".

== The Human Affliction (2015) ==
Released during July 2015, The Human Affliction is an instrumental cyber metal concept album, based on a story Wardingham wrote.

The album features guest solos by Per Nilsson (Scar Symmetry) on the track 'Burning Chrome', Stephan Forte (Adagio) on 'Digital Apocalypse' and Andy James (Wearing Scars) and Christian Muenzner (Necrophagist) on the a bonus track 'Day of the Droids.

== Spiritual Machines (2016) ==
On 14 March 2016, it was announced on Wardingham's website that he had begun work on a third solo album titled Spiritual Machines. Spiritual Machines was released on 21 November 2016.

== Electromancer (2018) ==
On 30 November 2017, Paul Wardingham revealed on his website the cover artwork, track listing and release date for his fourth self-produced solo album titled Electromancer set for release 12 March 2018 on Enigmatic Records.

Like Wardingham's sophomore effort The Human Affliction, Electromancer is a concept album inspired by an original story set on Earth in the year 2217.

Electromancer features cover artwork by Light The Torch (ex-Devil You Know) and former All Shall Perish guitarist Francesco Artusato.

Electromancer was released 10 April 2018.

On 1 September 2018, Paul Wardingham announced on his website that recording had begun on a follow-up release to his cyber metal concept album Electromancer, titled "Electromancer:Corrupted".

== Day Zero: Rise of the Horde (2020) ==
On 30 June 2020, Paul Wardingham released his 5th solo album Day Zero : Rise of the Horde. Described as a "Mad Max meets Resident Evil inspired futuristic thrash metal thriller". The album is the first in a 2 part album series.

== Equipment ==
=== Guitars ===
- Kiesel Vader (VX7) 7 string
- Kiesel Vader (VX8) 8 String
- Kiesel Osiris (OX7) 7 string
- Ibanez RGD2127z with EMG 707 pickups
- Ibanez RG8 with EMG 808 Pickups

=== Amplification ===
- Line 6 POD X3 Live
- Engl Powerball

=== Other equipment ===
- Jim Dunlop Guitar Picks & Strings
- Roland System 8 synthesizer
- Roland SE-02 synthesizer
- Korg MS2000 synthesizer
- Yamaha CS2x synthesizer
- Ensoniq ESQ-1 synthesizer

== Discography ==
=== The Collins/Wardingham Project ===
- 2006: Interactive

=== Solo ===
- 2011: Assimilate Regenerate
- 2015: The Human Affliction
- 2016: Spiritual Machines
- 2018: Electromancer
- 2020: Day Zero I : Rise of the Horde
- 2021: Cybergenesis
- 2022: Prototype
