= Prisonworld =

Studio album by Lyriel
- Released: January 17, 2005
- Genre: Folk metal, gothic metal, symphonic metal
- Length: 39:05
- Language: English, Sindarin
- Label: Black Bards
- Producer: Burkhard Lipps

Lyriel chronology
Prisonworld (2005)	Autumntales (2006)

Prisonworld is the debut studio album by the German folk metal band Lyriel. It contains mostly balladesque songs.

== Concept ==
The song "Lind e-huil" is sung in Sindarin, one of the fictional Elvish languages created by J. R. R. Tolkien. "The Symmetry of Disfiguration" was inspired by Wendy and Richard Pini's Elfquest series.

== Reception ==
Professional ratings
Review scores
Source	Rating
Metal Hammer Germany	4/7
Rock Hard	7.0

The Sonic Seducer and Rock Hard magazines interpreted the album as a tribute to Blackmore's Night. The latter review observed that while the album had been produced well the songs lacked a certain amount of pressure and did not really correspond to the Metal genre. Metal Hammer Germany compared singer Jessica Thierjung's voice to Doro Pesch and observed a frequent "Celtic mood" that was caused by the string instruments.

== Track listing ==
No.	Title	Length
1.	"At the Mindnightsgate"	01:31
2.	"Prisonworld"	03:44
3.	"The Crown of the Twilight"	03:22
4.	"Symmetry of Disfiguration"	03:48
5.	"The Singing Nightingale"	03:22
6.	"Lind e-huil"	05:31
7.	"There's a Rainbow in the Rain"	04:02
8.	"The Judgement of My Harvest Heart"	04:21
9.	"Fate of Knowledge"	01:23
10.	"Day in June"	03:47
11.	"The Spring and the Flight"	04:14
Total length:		39:05

== Personnel ==
- Linda Laukamp - vocals, cello
- Claudia Schäfer - violin
- Martin Ahmann - keyboards
- Jessica Thierjung - vocals
- Daniel de Beer - drums
- Sven Engelmann - bass
- Oliver Thierjung - guitars, backing vocals

== Additional personnel ==
- Jessica Alterauge - cover art
- Christoph Weller - layout, design
