= Tribal Eagle =

EP by Deuteronomium
- Released: 1997
- Recorded: 1996
- Studio: Studio Watercastle, Jyväskylä, Finland
- Genre: Melodic death metal death 'n' roll
- Length: 16:18
- Label: Self-financed (1997); Little Rose Productions (1998)
- Producer: Deuteronomium

Deuteronomium chronology
| Crosshope (1996) | Tribal Eagle (1997) | Street Corner Queen (1998) |

Tribal Eagle (DEUDCD-001, LRCD-001) is the first studio EP by Finnish Christian death metal band Deuteronomium, recorded in 1996 Studio Watercastle, published as self-financed release in 1997 and in 1998 by Little Rose Productions. Tribal Eagle is widely regarded as the first Finnish Christian metal CD. Tribal Eagle had a huge impact on the Finnish Christian metal scene and musically some consider it as Deuteronomium's finest effort.

== Overview ==
"Crosshope" is a punk rock influenced death metal song which incorporates Killing Joke type punk shouting vocals. Many know the song because in 2000 Markus "Black Raven" Vainionpää won The Annual Air Guitar World Championship contest by performing "Crosshope". "Thinking" is Deuteronomium's only old school death metal song which incorporates traditional death growl vocalization. The Lyrics of the song ponder about the endless circle and paradox of wars and what they reveal about the very nature of man's being. "Tribal Eagle" is a black metal influenced song which begins with an epic guitar melody, followed by chorus sung with clean vocals, the rest of the vocals being high-pitched shrieking. The lyrics of "Tribal Eagle" tell metaphorically about an eagle tattoo which is tied up in skin (World) with black ink (sin) and therefore cannot fly freely. "Blue Moment" is another black metal influenced song which incorporates some clean female vocals by Eeva Vehniäinen. The concept of the song is about a moment on a winter day during sunset when the nature seems blue for a short while. In this song it refers to a sad, depressing moment in one's life when an individual is uncertain whether tomorrow will come or not.

== Track listing ==
1. "Crosshope" – 3:49 (music: Miika Partala, lyrics: Manu Lehtinen and Miika Partala)
2. "Thinking" – 4:40 (music and lyrics by Miika Partala)
3. "Tribal Eagle" – 3:19 (music: Miika Partala, lyrics: Manu Lehtinen)
4. "Blue Moment" – 4:29 (music: Miika Partala, lyrics: Manu Lehtinen)

== Personnel ==
- Miika Partala – guitar and vocals
- Manu Lehtinen – bass guitar and background vocals
- Jari Mantour – guitar
- Johnny Pesonen – drums

=== Guest musicians ===
- Eeva Vehniäinen – female vocals in "Blue Moment"
