= For Aeons Past =

Studio album by Solution .45
- Released: 9 April 2010
- Recorded: September–December 2009 at Panic Room Studios
- Genre: Melodic death metal; progressive metal
- Length: 61:52
- Label: AFM Records
- Producer: Jani Stefanovic

Solution .45 chronology
For Aeons Past (2010)	Nightmares in the Waking State: Part I (2015)

Professional ratings
Review scores
Source	Rating
AllMusic	3/5 stars
About.com	3.5/5 stars

For Aeons Past is the debut studio album by Swedish metal band Solution .45. It was released in Europe on 24 March 2010 and in North America on 11 May 2010. On 15 February 2010, Solution .45 released the track "Gravitational Lensing" for free download.

The album features lyrics and guest vocals from Dark Tranquillity singer Mikael Stanne.

== Track listing ==
All music written by Jani Stefanovic & Christian Älvestam, except where noted. All lyrics written by Mikael Stanne, except where noted.

No.	Title	Length
1.	"The Close Beyond"	4:32
2.	"Gravitational Lensing"	4:54
3.	"Through Night-Kingdomed Gates"	5:28
4.	"For Aeons Past"	4:46
5.	"Lethean Tears" (music & lyrics by Christian Älvestam)	6:11
6.	"Bladed Vaults"	4:19
7.	"Wirethrone"	6:00
8.	"On Embered Fields Adust"	3:35
9.	"Into Shadow"	5:54
10.	"Clandestinity Now"	16:13

Japanese edition bonus track
No.	Title	Length
11.	"Spirit Side Dreaming"	3:46

== Personnel ==
=== Band members ===
- Christian Älvestam – vocals
- Jani Stefanovic – guitars
- Tom Gardiner – guitars
- Rolf Pilve – drums
- Anders Edlund – bass

=== Guests ===
- Mikko Härkin – keyboards
- Mikael Stanne – backing vocals, lyrics
- Patrik Gardberg – guitars
