= The Ascension of Extinction =

EP by Symphony of Heaven
- Released: September 4, 2020
- Recorded: 2019–2020
- Studio: Rusted Recordings Studios
- Genre: Melodic death metal, blackened death metal, death metal, Christian metal, blackened thrash, black metal
- Length: 17:36
- Label: Rottweiler Records
- Producer: Logan Thompson

Symphony of Heaven chronology
Body of Christ (2019)	The Ascension of Extinction (2020)	Maniacal Entropik Discordium (2021)

Singles from The Ascension of Extinction
- 1. "You Shall Be As Gods" Released: January 1, 2020; 2. "DeathMarch" Released: August 14, 2020

The Ascension of Extinction is the third EP by melodic death metal band Symphony of Heaven. The EP was the band's debut with Rottweiler Records, a Ft. Wayne, Indiana-based label that housed artists such as Skald in Veum and Pantokrator, both of whose vocalists share a guest spot on the EP. The EP was released on September 4, 2020. In the song "DeathMarch", the band quotes 2nd Thessalonians, chapter 2.

== Critical reception ==
Professional ratings
Review scores
Source	Rating
Beyond the Grave	9/10 stars
Metal Noise	7.5/10 stars
The Metal Onslaught	10/10 stars
The Metal Resource	8/10 stars

Nick Ptak of Beyond the Grave Magazine wrote "Overall, I really enjoyed listening to Symphony of Heaven’s new EP. I am impressed by their God-given musical talents and songwriting abilities. Their usage of growls, screams, narratives, and harmonies was incorporated very well. I look forward to what Symphony of Heaven will produce in the years to come.", while an additional staff writer known as Ton wrote "Many people will look forward to a full-length release. Can we expect some duration between the 50 and 60 minutes of this epicness?", both of which gave the album a 9/10 review. Metal Noise gave an 7.5 out of 10 for the EP, while comparing the band to the blackened thrash band Dizastra over one of the band's influences Dimmu Borgir.

Unstille Magazine author Lichtmensch did not give a numerical rating but gave a clear summary of the EP stating that "Symphony of Heaven have come a long way since their inception as a one-man project in 2017 and it’s amazing to witness them evolve their sound and become a very unique band with a very clear vision. With The Ascension of Extinction they are ready to deliver their most passionate and refined record yet – a swan song for a society that worships Man above God, indulges in immorality and follows blind leaders. If you like your death metal extra-energetic and blackened, make sure you don’t miss out on this one." Christian Sullivan of The Metal Onslaught Magazine gave a 10/10 review, remarking "Overall a fantastic piece of work done by Pathos and the band, with such a great blend of current black metal and we certainly can’t wait for the brand new album in the works." John Jackson of The Metal Resource gave a formidable review of 8/10 stars, stating "Symphony of Heaven have managed to create an ep filled with blackened death metal that makes the listener want more and my main issue with the release is that it’s only an ep. Lyrically the band addresses the inevitable fall of man as we turn from the divine to our own created gods and musically, the band brings that overwhelming dark heaviness that highlights the inevitable despair this shift will bring. Look out for this ep and keep an eye on the band for the full length which is in the works.", while also comparing the band to Behemoth, Antestor, and Slechtvalk.

== Track listing ==
No.	Title	Length
1.	"You Shall Be As Gods"	4:34
2.	"The Ascension of Extinction"	4:22
3.	"DeathMarch"	4:44
4.	"Mountain of Man's Ignorance"	3:56

== Personnel ==
Symphony of Heaven

- Logan "Pathos" Thompson - vocals, guitars, bass, drum programming, producer
- Eero Tertsunen - guitars, bass, drum programming (track 4)
- David Napier - bass (credited, did not perform)
- Mason Beard - drums (credited, did not perform)

Guest performances

- Karl Walfridsson - lyrics, artwork, vocals (track 2)
- Mund - lyrics, vocals (track 2)

Production

- Jesse Dean - mixing (tracks 1–3)
- Eero Tertsunen - mixing (track 4), mastering
- Shawn Browning - executive producer

Artwork

- Garrett McGill - art direction
