= Paranoid Circus =

- Original cover art

Studio album by Lyriel
- Released: December 1st, 2009
- Genre: Folk metal, gothic metal, symphonic metal
- Length: 48:01
- Label: Femme Metal, AFM
- Producer: Oliver Thierjung

Lyriel chronology
Autumntales (2006)	Paranoid Circus (2009)	Leverage (2012)

Alternative cover
- 2011 re-release cover

Paranoid Circus is the third studio album by the German folk metal band Lyriel originally released on Femme Metal Records in December 2009. The album was re-released on AFM Records in April 2011 with a new cover artwork and 2 bonus tracks.

== Reception ==
The Sonic Seducer observed that the band had notably moved away from their roots in medieval themes towards folk elements without losing their originality. Rock Hard wrote in contrast that the band had not changed their style but gained more routine while keeping a standard folk sound.

== Track listing ==
No.	Title	Length
1.	"Opening"	00:43
2.	"Welcome"	03:39
3.	"Like a Feather in the Wind"	04:01
4.	"The Regret"	03:03
5.	"Elderberry and Lavender"	03:55
6.	"Lullaby"	04:03
7.	"Foeman's Bride"	03:24
8.	"The Wolf" (feat. Simon Jäger; prose text by Hermann Hesse)	05:03
9.	"So Long, My Love"	04:17
10.	"My Unawakened Soul"	00:58
11.	"Paranoid Circus"	04:16
12.	"The Wheel of Fortuna"	04:34
13.	"The Way to Nowhere"	00:47
14.	"Another Time"	04:34
15.	"Conclusion"	00:44
Total length:		48:01

== Personnel ==
- Jessica Thierjung - vocals
- Oliver Thierjung - guitars, backing vocals
- Linda Laukamp - cello, backing vocals
- Daniel de Beer - drums
- Sven Engelmann - bass
- Joon Laukamp - violin
- Martin Ahmann - keyboards
