= Leverage (album) =

Studio album by Lyriel
- Released: 14 February 2012
- Genre: Folk metal, gothic metal, symphonic metal
- Label: AFM
- Producer: Tim Sonnenstuhl, Lyriel

Lyriel chronology
| Paranoid Circus (2009) | Leverage (2012) | Skin and Bones (2014) |

Leverage is the fourth studio album by the German folk metal band Lyriel.

== Style ==
Among a mix of soft folk rock as well as symphonic metal and Gothic Metal it features a duet with Schandmaul vocalist Thomas Lindner. Leverage contains two songs "The Road Not Taken" and "Parting" that are based on lyrics by Robert Frost and Charlotte Brontë respectively On the extended edition there is a version of "Everything's Coming Up Roses" by Black.

== Reception ==
Professional ratings
Review scores
| Source | Rating |
|---|---|
| Jukebox:Metal | 4/5 stars |
| Metal Hammer Germany | 3/7 |
| Stormbringer | 4/5 stars |

Leverage received several positive reviews in Germany, Austria and the United Kingdom. It was however noted that the "album does lose some steam near its conclusion" and that the band should have dared to evolve towards harder metal songs. Metal Hammer Germany criticised also that many songs were drifting off towards "Celtic kitsch", and that Lyriel's new orientation towards Nightwish was only backed up by their instrumental performance but not by the vocals.

== Track list ==
All music written by Oliver Thierjung, all lyrics written by Linda Laukamp, except where noted.

| No. | Title | Length |
|---|---|---|
| 1. | "When It's Coming to an End..." | 1:39 |
| 2. | "Leverage" | 3:49 |
| 3. | "Parting" (lyrics by Charlotte Brontë) | 3:24 |
| 4. | "Voices in My Head" | 4:18 |
| 5. | "The Road Not Taken" (lyrics by Robert Frost) | 3:45 |
| 6. | "White Lily" | 4:05 |
| 7. | "Aus der Tiefe [From the Depth]" | 3:21 |
| 8. | "Wenn die Engel fallen [When Angels Are Falling]" (featuring Thomas Lindner; written by Armin Rodriguez) | 3:21 |
| 9. | "Side by Side" | 3:00 |
| 10. | "Repentance" | 4:10 |
| 11. | "Everything's Coming Up Roses" (extended edition bonus track; lyrics by Black) | 3:24 |
| 12. | "Star of the County Down" (enhanced digipak bonus track; traditional Irish music; lyrics by Cathal MacGarvey) | 3:58 |

== Personnel ==
Lyriel

- Jessica Thierjung – vocals
- Tim Sonnenstuhl – guitars
- Steffen Feldmann – bass
- Joon Laukamp – violin
- Oliver Thierjung – guitars
- Marcus Fidorra – drums
- Linda Laukamp – cello, backing vocals

Additional personnel

- Stefan Grawe – piano on "Wenn die Engel Fallen"
- Thomas Lindner – vocals on "Wenn die Engel Fallen"
- Sebastian Sonntag – vocals on "Voices in My Head"
- Hiko – cover art, layout
- Thomas Pleq Johansson – mixing
- Sinan Muslu – photography
- Patrick Temme – photography
