= 21st Century Killing Machine =

Studio album by One Man Army and the Undead Quartet
- Released: January 6, 2006
- Recorded: Bohus Sound September 2005
- Genre: Death metal
- Label: Nuclear Blast

One Man Army and the Undead Quartet chronology
21st Century Killing Machine (2006)	Error in Evolution (2007)

21st Century Killing Machine is the debut album by Swedish death-thrash metal band One Man Army and the Undead Quartet.

== Reception ==
Metal.de gave 8/10 points.

== Track listing ==
1. "Killing Machine" – 6:42 (Johan Lindstrand)
2. "Devil on the Red Carpet" – 5:04 (Lindstrand, Mikael Lagerblad)
3. "Public Enemy No 1" – 4:12 (Lindstrand, Valle Adzic)
4. "No Apparent Motive" – 3:54 (Lindstrand, Adzic)
5. "Hell Is for Heroes" – 5:00 (Lindstrand)
6. "When Hatred Comes to Life" – 4:50 (Lindstrand, Adzic)
7. "So Grim So True So Real" – 4:22 (Lindstrand, Adzic)
8. "Behind the Church" – 4:09 (Lindstrand, Pekka Kiviaho)
9. "Branded by Iron" – 6:51 (Lindstrand, Adzic)
10. "Bulldozer Frenzy" – 2:49 (Lindstrand)
11. "The Sweetness of Black (Bonus Track)" – 4:58 (Lindstrand)
12. "Mary’s Raising the Dead (Bonus Track)" – 6:49 (Lindstrand)

== Personnel ==
- Johan Lindstrand: Vocal
- Mikael Lagerblad: Lead guitar
- Pekka Kiviaho: Rhythm guitar
- Valle Adzic: Bass
- Marek Dobrowolski: Drums
- Recorded & Engineered By One Man Army And The Undead Quartet & Dragan Tanaskovic
- Vocals Recorded & Engineered By Valle Advic
- Mastered By Dragan Tanaskovic
