= Temple of Perdition =

Black metal project

- Origin: Texas, United States; Switzerland; Australia
- Genres: Death metal; doom metal; unblack metal (early)
- Years active: 2017–2019, 2019–present
- Labels: independent, Vision of God Records
- Members: Ya'akov Nahash; Corey Sorrenti; Erebos; Matthew McKenzie
- Past members: Ronny Hansen; Benainah; Carlos Osnaya; Joonas Heikkinen; Shelby Brown; Steve Reishus; Henna Ojala; Luke Renno
- Website: Temple of Perdition on Facebook

Temple of Perdition is a black metal project that began in September 2017, between Ya'akov Nahash, Joonas Heikkinen, and Benainah, out of Texas in the United States and Finland. Shortly after their formation, the band signed with Vision of God Records.

== History ==
Temple of Perdition began in September 2017, originating with the lineup of Ya'akov Nahash on vocals, guitars, bass, and keyboards, Benaiah on vocals, and Joonas Heikkinen on drums. Heikkinen also performed with bands including The Slave Eye, Angel Of Sodom, and Renascent. The band began writing and recording material, releasing a demo independently in late January 2018. However, the album was quickly taken down as the band signed with Vision of God shortly thereafter and released the demo through the new found outlet. Following the release of the demo, the band was nominated for "Best New Extreme Metal Band of 2018" by Metal Mofos. Temple of Perdition recorded their full-length album - with the new addition of Corey Sorrenti on bass - and released it through their label, titled Tetragrammaton, which also featured Sakis Tolis of Rotting Christ, who was an old acquaintance of his.

On December 28, 2018, it was announced that Heikkinen and Benaiah had departed from the band, leaving Nahash and Sorrenti in the lineup. However, shortly afterward, at the beginning of 2019, it was announced that Temple of Perdition's new lineup would be more in the way of a supergroup, including new members Ronny Hansen (Antestor, Grave Declaration, Sylvan Fortress, Vaakevandring) on Vocals, Luke Renno (Taking the Head of Goliath, Crimson Thorn, Sylvan Fortress) on vocals, Henna Ojala (Varda) on vocals, and Shelby Brown (Trond) on drums. However, around a week later on January 14, it was announced Brown could not perform with the band and that the drum position would be open. On February 21, it was announced that Steve Reishus of Taking the Head of Goliath and Crimson Thorn would take on the mantle of drummer. The band recorded a new EP, titled Homage to the Dead. On April 27, 2019, the band released a lyric video for the title track of their upcoming EP, debuting the newest members of the band. On June 3, 2019, the band announced their disbanding, releasing a new single, titled "Ode to Yah".

However, after two months and two days, the band reunited, with the announcement that they would finish their second album, Inheritance of Lies. The band announced that they are no longer signed with Vision of God Records on October 1, 2019. Reishus, Ojala and Renno departed from the band the same time, due to controversy with the band's views.

At the end of 2019 it was announced that the Ronny would be replaced by Erebos as lead vocals for the release of Inheritance of Lies album. Matthew McKenzie was also announced by the band to come into the project as Composer and Lyrics for new content and future releases.

== Lyrical content and religious background ==
The band by the press has been titled a Christian band by being associated with the Record Label Vision of God Records. However, in one article the background is clarified as not a Christian band in the traditional sense of the terminology. In an interview with Ya'akov Nahash stated that many of the lyrics were anti-religious, but not Satanic. The album also has spiritual aspects to it, including a man crying out to God. All of the band members identify as Christians except Yaakov and Cori who really cannot be labeled, while the band speaks against corruption in churches and general "religion" as a whole.

However, in late 2019, the band renounced their Christian belief system, and decided to "go secular". Certain members of the band are still Christian, but the main writer, Ya'akov claims to take a Kabalistic, qlippothic and Hermetic view from his deeper study into Kabalistic tree of life and the Tree of Death. The band's drummer at the time departed due to this fact. Vision of God Records Split ways with the band due to both agreeing that there was a conflict of interest due to the band's new lyrical and secular direction.

In late 2019 the band announced the replacement of Ronny Hansen With Erebos. This marking the last of any Christian influence within the project and a full dedication to Kabalistic, qlippothic and Hermetic view from all the band members.

== Members ==
Current members
Name	Instrument	Years	Other groups
Ya'akov Nahash	clean vocals, guitars, keyboards (2017–present), bass (2017–2018)	2017–2019, 2019–present	
Erebos	unclean vocals	2019–present	Tenebrae Aeternum, Kether, Frozen Gate, Faille, Soldiers Bloodcraft
Matthew McKenzie	clean Vocals, guitars	2019–present	Swan Messiah
Corey Sorrenti	Bass, Mixing Engineer	2018–2019, 2019–present	Vanishment, Designer Shiner, Mr. Scary, Piece of Tomorrow, Atticist, Losing Tomorrow

Former members
Name	Instrument	Years	Other groups
Benaiah	vocals	2017–2018	
Luke Renno	unclean vocals	2019	Taking the Head of Goliath, Crimson Thorn, Axehead Inc., Obadiah, Sylvan Fortress, Altruist
Henna Ojala	female vocals	2019-2019	Varda
Carlos Osnaya	guitars	2018	Exousia, Amberdawn
Joonas Heikkinen	drums	2017–2018	Angel of Sodom, The Slave Eye, Renascent
Shelby Brown	drums	2019	Tond
Steve Reishus	drums	2019	Taking the Head of Goliath, Crimson Thorn
Ronny Hansen	unclean vocals	2019	Antestor, Vaakevandring, Grave Declaration, Sylvan Fortress, Morgenroede

Timeline

== Discography ==
Demos

- Demo (2018)

Studio albums

- Tetragrammaton (2018)
- Inheritance of Lies (TBA)

EPs

- Homage to the Dead (2019)

Singles

- "Adonai (Enochian Mix)" (2018)
- "Ode to Yah" (2019)
- "Wvil" (2019)
