= The Slave Eye =

American black metal band

- Origin: Raleigh, North Carolina; Bloomington, Indiana
- Genres: Black metal, Blackened thrash
- Years active: 2015–present
- Members: Siervo; Eero Tertsunen; Daniel Cordova; Joonas Heikkinen

The Slave Eye is a black metal supergroup that originated in Raleigh, North Carolina. However, the project sees contributions from North Carolina, Indiana, California, of the United States and Finland. The band was created by Siervo and Eero Tertsunen, the latter being known for the band Renascent.

== History ==
The Slave Eye began in Raleigh, North Carolina by Siervo, who hired on Eero Tertsunen of Renascent as the band's guitarist in late 2015. The two began working on a demo, which would be titled Black Rust. However, before it was recorded, the band hired on Daniel Cordova, formerly of Vengeance Rising, on bass and Joonas Heikkinen, of Renascent and Angel of Sodom, on drums. With the full lineup, the band recorded the demo and released it on May 1, 2016. With the demo out, the band contributed "Black Stone Idol" to Hymns of the Blackest Light, Vol. 1.

Following the demo, the band began to record a full EP, which was titled Unto Hades. The EP was released on September 22, 2017, and received positive reviews.

== Members ==
Current

- Siervo – vocals (2015–present)
- Eero Tertsunen – guitars (2015–present), bass, drums (2015–2016)
- Daniel Cordova – bass (2016–present)
- Joonas Heikkinen – drums (2016–present)

== Discography ==
Demos

- Black Rust (2016)

EPs

- Unto Hades (2017)

Compilation appearances

- "Black Stone Idol", Hymns of the Blackest Light, Vol. 1 (2017)
- "Sore Upon Sore", Unknown compilation (2017)
