= Veil of Remembrance =

Studio album by Crimson Moonlight
- Released: January 26, 2005
- Genre: Unblack metal, Blackened death metal
- Length: 43:13
- Label: Rivel Records

Crimson Moonlight chronology
| Songs from the Archives (2003) | Veil of Remembrance (2005) | In Depths of Dreams Unconscious (2007) |

Veil of Remembrance is the second full-length album by the Swedish group Crimson Moonlight. Veil of Remembrance was officially released on January 26, 2005 although it was already available since December 4, 2004.

== Overview ==
On Veil of Remembrance, Crimson Moonlight began playing a hybrid mixture of black and death metal with grindcore influences. Simon Rosén has said about the stylistic direction:

We decided to skip the keyboard on the new release since we realized that the sound could turn into a heavier and rawer direction without the keys. And since a lot of us are much into extreme Death metal bands like: Nile, Malevolent Creation, Living Sacrifice, Defleshed, Suffocation and Rotten Sound and also more Thrash metal bands like Death, Believer and At the Gates it also had some effects on our new sound.

Veil of Remembrance received a positive reception, as Rosén says:

The response for VoR has been great. For example the biggest metal magazine in Sweden which described the album as: "Great played black metal, grinding forth in a furious speed and eagerness& If the word intelligent ever can be used in the genre, this is a perfect example". A lot of people say that they really like the fast blasting combine with the dark melodic riffing. And to mix the Scandinavian chaotic black metal parts with more brutal death metal elements also seems to have a positive effect in a lot of reviews. We are really thankful for all those nice words about our music and we hope that the reviews in the future will be in the same direction.

== Track listing ==
1. "Intimations of Everlasting Constancy" - 04:42
2. "Painful Mind Contradiction" - 04:31
3. "Embraced by the Beauty of Cold" - 03:15
4. "The Echoes of Thought" - 03:55
5. "My Grief, My Remembrance" - 05:31
6. "The Cold Grip of Terror" - 05:41
7. "Illusion Was True Beauty" - 04:45
8. "Contemplations Along the Way" - 05:53
9. "Reflections Upon the Distress and Agony of Faith" - 05:00

== Curiosity ==
The Lyrics of the tracks 8 and 9 ("Contemplations Along the Way" - "Reflections Upon the Distress and Agony of Faith") are a text parts of the Søren Kierkegaard's book "Fear and Trembling".
