= Lyriel =

German heavy metal band

- Origin: Gummersbach, Germany
- Genres: Folk metal Folk rock Celtic metal Symphonic metal Gothic metal
- Years active: 2003-present
- Labels: Black Bard; Femme Metal Records; AFM
- Members: Jessica Thierjung; Thomas Raser; Linda Laukamp; Joon Laukamp; Marcus Fidorra; Tim Sonnenstuhl
- Past members: Daniel de Beer; Sven Engelmann; Martin Ahman; Johannes Anand; Matthias Kirchler; Steffen Feldmann; Olliver Thierjung
- Website: lyriel-band.de

Lyriel are a German heavy metal band who formed in autumn of 2003 in Gummersbach. Originally playing folk metal, they turned more towards symphonic and gothic metal. Lyriel has recorded five studio albums and published a DVD of a live performance.

== History ==
The band's lineup remained unchanged from their formation until 2008. Lyriel played as opening act for bands such as Elis, Visions of Atlantis, Regicide, Xandria, Schandmaul, Corvus Corax, Saltatio Mortis, Oomph, Schelmish, Korpiklaani and Manfred Mann's Earth Band.

In 2005 they toured Germany, Austria and Belgium with Elis and Visions of Atlantis, in February 2006 Lyriel played on the “Romantic Darkness Tour“ together with Regicide and Xandria. Moreover, they played on the Celtic Rock Festival at Greifenstein castle in Hesse. A video was released of the show. The first studio album Prisonworld was released on 17 January 2005. Especially notable is the song "Lind e-huil" which is sung in Sindarin, a fictional Elvish language created by J. R. R. Tolkien. The song "The Symmetry of Disfiguration" was inspired by Wendy and Richard Pini's Elfquest series.

Their second studio album Autumntales was published on 29 September 2006. It continues the band's style and among other songs contains a cover version of "Hijo de la Luna". The performance of the string instruments was lauded by the musical press, as well as Jessica Thierjung's singing. The track "My Favourite Dream", recorded together with Sabine Dünser of Elis, was also acclaimed as one of the harder songs on the album.

In September 2008 drummer Daniel de Beer left the band and was replaced by Marcus Fidorra. Since then the lineup has changed several times.

The First Chapters, a remastered compilation album containing the first two studio albums was published in 2009. A new album Paranoid Circus followed on 29 January 2010. German voice actor Simon Jäger, known for dubbing actors like Heath Ledger and Matt Damon, appears as a guest artist on the album, reading an introduction and an excerpt from Hermann Hesse's short story The Wolf in the middle of the album. German and Austrian reviews agreed that while offering a high musical standard this album lacks the general speed of the previous releases. The album was re-released on AFM Records in April 2011 with a new cover artwork and 2 bonus tracks.

Lyriel signed with AFM Records in 2011. A fourth album named Leverage was released in February 2012. Among a mix of soft folk rock as well as symphonic metal, it features a duet with Schandmaul vocalist Thomas Lindner. Leverage received positive reviews in Germany, Austria and the United Kingdom. It was however noted that the "album does lose some steam near its conclusion" and that the band should have dared to evolve towards harder metal songs. Leverage contains two songs "The Road Not Taken" and "Parting" that are based on lyrics by Robert Frost and Charlotte Brontë respectively On the extended edition there is a version of "Everything's Coming Up Roses" by Black.

The band's fifth album Skin and Bones was released in September 2014 after bassist Steffen Feldmann had left the band. In March 2015, founding member Oliver Thierjung announced that he had left the band because of health issues. He was replaced by Thomas Raser in April that year. Also in April 2015, the band released a 10-years-anniversary EP called 10.

== Style and influences ==
The septet designate their music "Dark Romantic Celtic Rock". Lyriel's repertoire ranges from medievally inspired ballads to hard rock pieces with elements of classical and folk music. Early recordings were frequently compared to Blackmore's Night, but the band has evolved towards symphonic metal with gothic influences.

== Band Members ==
=== Current members ===
- Jessica Thierjung - vocals (2003–present)
- Linda Laukamp - cello, backing vocals (2003–present)
- Joon Laukamp - violin (2005-2010, 2011–present)
- Marcus Fidorra - drums (2008–present)
- Tim Sonnenstuhl - guitars (2011–present), bass (2011)
- Thomas Raser - bass, backing vocals (2015–present)

=== Former Members ===
- Claudia Schäfer - violin (2003-2005)
- Daniel de Beer - drums (2003-2008)
- Sven Engelmann - bass (2003-2010)
- Martin Ahmann - keyboards (2003-2010)
- Oliver Thierjung - guitars (2003-2013), bass (2013-2015), backing vocals (2003-2015)
- Matthias Kirchler - bass (2010-2011)
- Johannes Anand - violin (2010-2011)
- Steffen Feldmann - bass (2011-2013)

Timeline

== Discography ==
=== Studio albums ===
- Prisonworld (2005)
- Autumntales (2006)
- Paranoid Circus (2009)
- Leverage (2012)
- Skin and Bones (2014)

=== Compilation ===
- The First Chapters (2009)

=== EP ===
- 10 (2015)

=== DVD ===
- Live auf Burg Greifenstein [Live on Greifenstein Castle] (2005) contains video footage of events of the 3rd Celtic Rock Open Air festival.
