= One Man Army and the Undead Quartet =

Swedish metal band

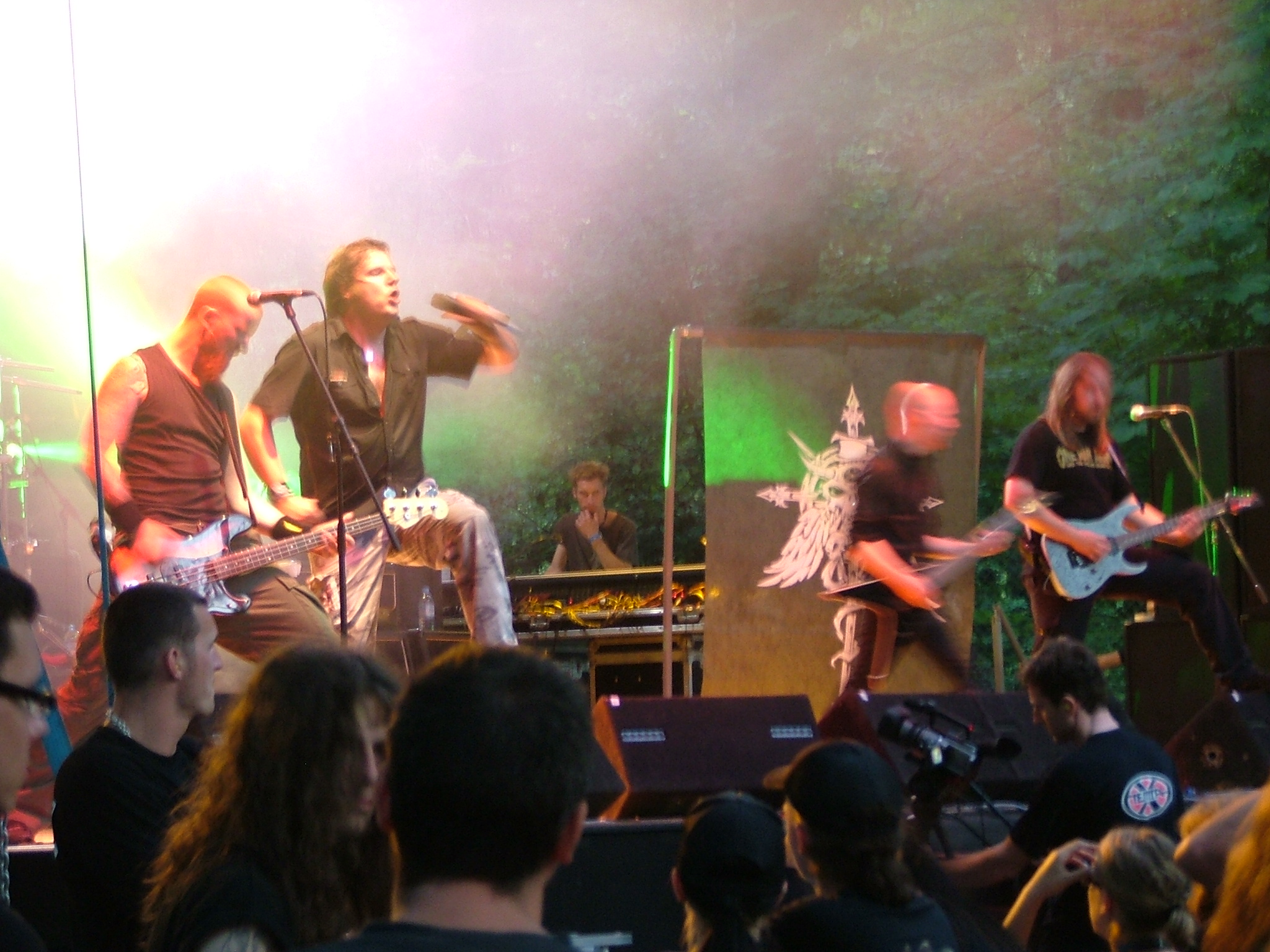
- OneManArmy @ Metalcamp 2004

Background information
- Origin: Trollhättan, Sweden
- Genres: melodic death metal thrash metal
- Years active: 2004–2012
- Label: Nuclear Blast; Massacre Records
- Past members: Mikael Lagerblad; Valle Adzic; Johan Lindstrand; Pekka Kiviaho; Marek Dobrowolski; Robert Axelsson; Jonas Blom

One Man Army and the Undead Quartet was a Swedish band that played a fusion of melodic death metal and thrash metal. The band was formed by vocalist Johan Lindstrand after the breakup of The Crown. After two albums on Nuclear Blast Records, they moved to Massacre Records. Their third album, Grim Tales, received mediocre reviews.

The band officially split-up in 2012.

== Members ==
=== Final line-up ===
- Johan Lindstrand – vocals (2004–2012)
- Robert Axelsson – bass (2005–2012)
- Jonas Blom – lead guitar (2009–2012)
- Marek Dobrowolski – drums (2005–2012)

=== Past members ===
- Mikael Lagerblad – lead guitar (2005–2009)
- Valle Adzic – bass (2005)
- Pekka Kiviaho – rhythm guitar (2005–2007)
- Mattias Bolander - lead guitar (2008–2011)

== Discography ==
=== Albums ===
- 21st Century Killing Machine (Album, Nuclear Blast, 2006)
- Error in Evolution (Album, Nuclear Blast, 2007)
- Grim Tales (Album, Massacre Records, 2008)
- The Dark Epic (Album, Massacre Records, 2011)

=== Singles/EPs ===
- When Hatred Comes to Life (EP, 2005)
- "Christmas for the Lobotomizer" (Single, 2006)
