= The Season of Death =

Studio album by Symphony of Heaven
- Released: November 24, 2017
- Recorded: 2017
- Studio: Commander86 Studios
- Genre: Symphonic death metal; progressive death metal; melodic death metal
- Length: 46:47
- Label: Nosral Recordings
- Producer: Luke Dinan

Symphony of Heaven chronology
...Of Scars and Soil... (2017)	The Season of Death (2017)	Body of Christ (2019)

The Season of Death is the debut album by the melodic death metal project Symphony of Heaven. The project began in 2017, starting off with an EP, titled ...Of Scars and Soil..., with all three tracks being re-recorded and released again on the album. The album was recorded at Commander86 Studios, by the band's brainchild, Logan Thompson and was produced by Luke Dinan of Children of Wrath.

The album was released via Nosral Recordings. The artwork premiered through Indie Vision Music. The band released a lyric video for the track "In Anger's Midst" following the album's release.

== Critical reception ==
The album received mixed to good reviews, receiving reviews from The Metal Resource, Indie Vision Music, Mind Noise Network, and several others.

The Metal Resource writer Ankit Sood gave the album a 7 out of 10, stating "For a debut album I gave it a good listen, and often more than usual and I couldn’t help listen to it over and over again. There is some promising music delivered but I feel it is yet to hit maturity (here’s hoping for more music in the future) Do give it a listen!!"

Chris Gatto of Heaven's Metal Magazine gave the album a 4 out of 5, commenting that "An excellent debut that has stayed in my cd player for a long time." Mind Noise Network journalist Dave Barlow gave the album an 8 out of 10, reviewing "I’moing to make a confession to my fellow underground metalheads, I don’t like black metal. Never Have. I’ve never got it. But this album is different. It’s like when you meet someone new and you’re drawn to them. Something about them just sparks something down deep. your imagination starts to run wild and you’re physically and emotionally altered. It’s not an overstatement to say that’s how this album made feel. So who knows, maybe there is hope for me yet and maybe Logan Thompson is the man to convert me (in more ways than one!)."

== Track listing ==
No.	Title	Length
1.	"Stratagem"	4:22
2.	"War in the Wind"	8:07
3.	"Anno Domini"	3:44
4.	"In Anger's Midst"	5:03
5.	"The Meditation of My Heart"	3:49
6.	"Of Scars and Soil"	6:41
7.	"Come and Rest"	6:54
8.	"Time Transcending"	8:07
Total length:		46:47

== Personnel ==
Symphony of Heaven

- Logan Thompson – vocals, instrumentation

Production

- Luke Dinan – mastering, producer
- Threadbare Artwork – artwork
