= Solution .45 =

Swedish melodic death metal band

- Origin: Sweden
- Genre: Melodic death metal
- Years active: 2007–2017, 2019–2024
- Label: AFM
- Past members: Mikko Härkin; Anders Edlund; Tom Gardiner; Ronnie Björnström; Christian Älvestam; Jani Stefanovic; Patrik Gardberg; Rolf Pilve; Henric Liljesand

Solution .45 was a melodic death metal supergroup from Sweden, formed by guitarist Jani Stefanovic (Miseration, Divinefire, Essence of Sorrow). Their final lineup consisted of vocalist Christian Älvestam (Miseration, ex-Scar Symmetry), guitarists Stefanovic and Patrik Gardberg (Divinefire, Torchbearer, The Few Against Many, Ammotrack), drummer Rolf Pilve (Miseration, Essence of Sorrow, Stratovarius), and bassist Henric Liljesand (The Unguided, Cipher System, Night Crowned, Nightrage, Dead by April).

== History ==
In late 2007, Jani Stefanovic formed Solution .45. Christian Älvestam, who had left Scar Symmetry in 2008, was one of the last members to join. Stefanovic stressed that despite Älvestam's presence, the band would not be a Scar Symmetry clone, and that songs were ready before his arrival. In the fall of 2008, an 8-track demo was produced by Tomas "Plec" Johansson (Unmoored, Scar Symmetry), with a demo track titled "Clandestinity Now" available over the internet.

Solution .45 entered Panic Room Studios in September 2009 to record its first full-length album, For Aeons Past, with Dark Tranquillity vocalist Mikael Stanne writing most of the lyrics. The record was finished and mastered in December 2009, and issued by AFM records in Europe and Marquee/Avalon in Japan; released on 9 April 2010 in Europe, and 11 May in North America.

On 23 January 2010, the band parted ways with keyboardist Mikko Härkin, who still contributed keyboards to the record but was regarded as a guest musician rather than a permanent band member. Furthermore, on 29 May 2010, Stefanovic was left the band amicably, and Patrik Gardberg (from Torchbearer, The Few Against Many, and Ammotrack) replaced him. The band hoped to involve Stefanovic in the future.

By 25 August 2010, Solution .45 released a music video for "Gravitational Lensing". The video for "Lethean Tears" was released on 30 July 2011.

On 11 August 2011, Stefanovic returned to the band, which would feature three guitarists (Stefanovic, Gardiner, and Gardberg). Bassist Anders Edlund left the group on mutual terms.

As of mid-2014, the group was working on their second and third studio albums. On 9 July 2014, the band announced that Tom Gardiner left the band

On 31 August 2015, the band announced 20 November 2015 as the release date of Part 1 of their new album, which would be released worldwide through vinyl, CD and most digital platforms. The album was titled Nightmares In The Waking State: Part I. Following the release of Part I, Nightmares in the Waking State: Part II was released in August 2016.

In January 2023, it was announced that a new album was being worked on and expected to be completed by early 2024. The band announced their split-up in May 2024 due to lack of motivation.

== Members ==
Final lineup

- Christian Älvestam – vocals, keyboards (2007–2017, 2019–2024) (Miseration, The Few Against Many, ex-Scar Symmetry)
- Rolf Pilve – drums (2007–2017, 2019–2024) (Miseration, Essence of Sorrow, Stratovarius)
- Jani Stefanovic – guitars (2007–2010, 2011–2017, 2019-2024), keyboards (2011–2017, 2019–2024) (Miseration, Divinefire, Essence of Sorrow, The Few Against Many)
- Patrik Gardberg – guitars (lead, rhythm), keyboards (2010–2016, 2023-2024) (Divinefire, Torchbearer, The Few Against Many, Ammotrack)
- Henric Liljesand – bass (2023-2024) (The Unguided, Cipher System, Night Crowned, Nightrage, Dead by April)

Former

- Mikko Härkin – keyboards (2007–2010) (Symfonia, Kotipelto, ex-Sonata Arctica, Mehida)
- Anders Edlund – Bass (2007–2012) (Angel Blake, The Few Against Many)
- Tom "Tomma" Gardiner – guitars (2007–2014) (Hateform, ex-Mors Principium Est)
- Ronnie Björnström – guitars (2016–2017, 2019–2023) (Defiatory, Ill-Wisher, Taedeat, ex-Aeon)

Timeline

== Discography ==
- For Aeons Past (2010)
- Nightmares in the Waking State: Part I (2015)
- Nightmares in the Waking State: Part II (2016)
