= Eternal Emperor =

EP by Crimson Moonlight
- Released: 1998
- Genre: Symphonic black metal
- Length: 18:01
- Label: Independent

Crimson Moonlight chronology
Glorification of the Master of Light (1997)	Eternal Emperor (1998)	Live in Värsås (1998)

Eternal Emperor is Crimson Moonlight's first EP. It was released in 1998 and introduced a more polished output that focuses on keyboard-driven symphonic black metal. The EP would often be compared to many similar symphonic black metal groups at the time, especially Dimmu Borgir.

== Track listing ==
1. "Intro-Preludium" - 02:01
2. "Where Darkness Cannot Reach" - 03:30
3. "Symphony of Moonlight" - 02:19
4. "Eternal Emperor" - 04:31
5. "The Final Battle" - 05:40
