= MyGRAIN =

Finnish melodic death metal band

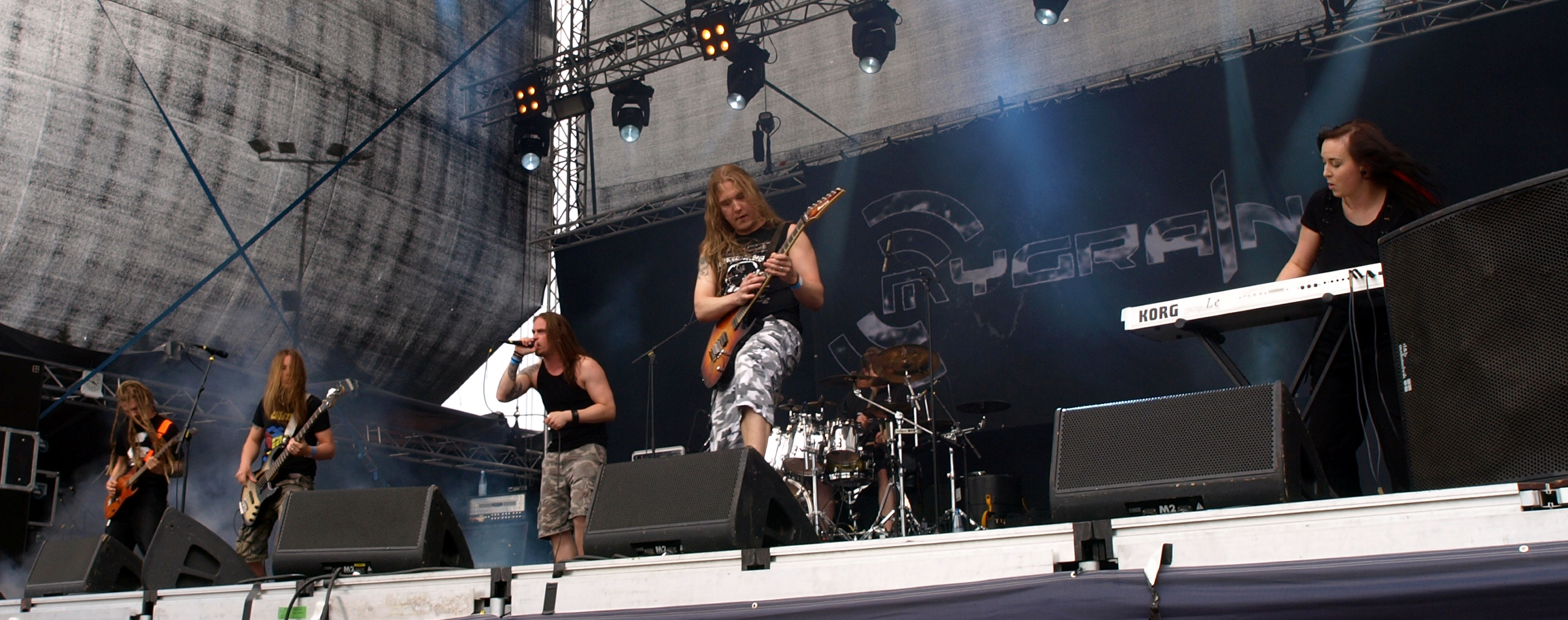
- Myötätuulirock in 2011

Background information
- Origin: Helsinki, Finland
- Genres: Melodic death metal
- Years active: 2004–2015, 2018–present
- Label: Spinefarm
- Members: Tommy; Joni Lahdenkauppi; Teemu Ylämäki; Jonas; DJ Locomotive
- Past members: Matthew; Resistor; Eve Kojo
- Website: MyGrain on Facebook

myGRAIN is a Finnish melodic death metal band from Helsinki. They have released five studio albums and one EP.

== History ==
myGRAIN formed in 2004. The band roster was Tommy Tuovinen (vocals), Resistor (rhythm guitar), Jonas (bass), and Matthew (guitar) from their former band, New Science Band. DJ Locomotive (drums) and Eve Kojo (keyboards) joined the band prior to the record deal with Spinefarm Records. The band produced two self-financed demos, the second of which, The Red Frame, resulted in a deal with Spinefarm.

They released their debut album Orbit Dance in April 2006. It consisted of eleven songs of modern metal, demonstrating both Nordic and American melodic death metal in its song construction. The band toured heavily in Finland to promote the release of Orbit Dance. During this time, they continued to record new songs, and in February 2008 they released their second album Signs of Existence. In January 2011, myGRAIN released their self-titled third album. In early 2013, they announced a new album, Planetary Breathing, to be released in April. A little later, the album was pushed back to September due to disagreements with the label.

The band broke up in May 2015, stating on Facebook: "All this has taken its toll on the band and for a long time, especially after all the problems we had with the release of 'Planetary Breathing', we have struggled with the question whether we still have the fire and the strength to go on...we will most definitely continue making music in our separate projects."

A new post appeared on the band's Facebook page on 26 October 2018, with a YouTube link to a new myGRAIN song called "Lightless". It was one of three new tracks that was released on the EP III in November 2018. It was followed by the album V in 2020.

== Members ==
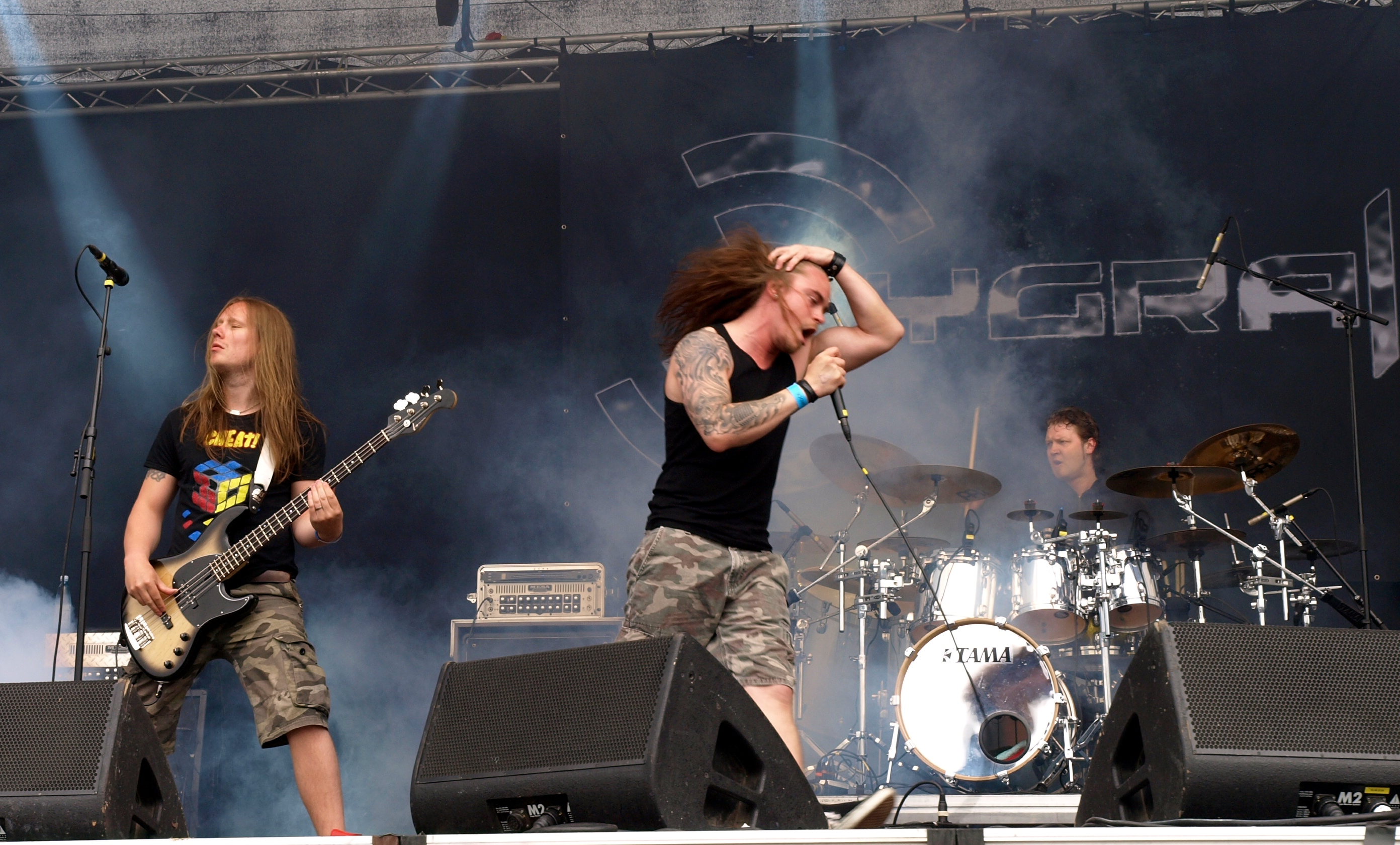
MyGrain in 2011

=== Current members ===
- Tommy "To(mm)yboy" Tuovinen – vocals (2004–2015, 2018–present)
- Joni Lahdenkauppi – rhythm guitar (2013–2015, 2018–present)
- Teemu "Mr. Downhill" Ylämäki – lead guitar (2008–2015, 2018–present) (Misery Inc.)
- Jonas Kuhlberg – bass (2004–2015, 2018–present)
- Janne "DJ Locomotive" Mikael Manninen – drums (2004–2015, 2018–present) (...And Oceans)

=== Former members ===
- Matthew – lead guitar (2004–2008)
- Resistor – rhythm guitar (2004–2013)
- Eve Kojo – keyboards (2004–2015, 2018–2019)

== Discography ==
=== Studio albums ===
- Orbit Dance (2006)
- Signs of Existence (2008)
- myGRAIN (2011)
- Planetary Breathing (2013)
- V (2020)

=== EPs ===
- III (2018)

=== Demos ===
- Demo 2004 (2004)
- The Red Frame (2005)
