= The Few Against Many =

Swedish death metal band

The Few Against Many is a Swedish death metal band. The band members are Christian Älvestam (lead singer and rhythm guitarist), Patrik Gardberg (lead guitarist), Anders Edlund (bass guitar), Pär Johansson (backup vocals) and Jani Stefanovic (drum kit). The band's first album is Sot. The album was released in 2009 on the Pulverised Records label.

Allmusic reviewed Sot, giving it a 3/5 score. The review stated that the debut album contains "...particularly aggressive and frenetic death metal (lots of blastbeats), either streaked with scattershot symphonic embellishments...or densely integrated orchestrations and synthesizers". The review states that the lead singer does not use his "...accomplished clean singing voice and goes strictly Cookie Monster [death growl] throughout." The review criticized the "...synthetic, rather cheap-sounding" sound of some songs and the "...limited amount of material...[on the album;] just eight songs lasting 36 minutes".
