= Miseration =

Swedish death metal band

- Origin: Sweden
- Genres: Death metal, melodic death metal (early)
- Years active: 2006–present
- Labels: Lifeforce
- Members: Christian Älvestam; Jani Stefanovic
- Past members: Marcus "Skägget" Bertilsson; Oskar Nilsson; Christian Lundgren; Tobias Alpadie; Johan Ylenstrand; Rolf "Stuka" Pilve

Miseration is a Swedish death metal band formed in 2006. Their lyrics primarily deal with themes of inner struggles and religious conflict. The band is one out of a collection of collaborations with both former Crimson Moonlight guitarist Jani Stefanovic and former Scar Symmetry vocalist Christian Älvestam; for example, both also played with Solution .45.

== History ==
Miserations' first album, Your Demons – Their Angels, was released 20 September 2008.

The band recorded their second album, titled The Mirroring Shadow, at Panic-Room studios with producer Tomas "Plec" Johansson. It was released through Lifeforce Records on 16 November 2009.

"Musically it's definitely a step up, intensity- and aggression-wise; also being more technical than its predecessor. Even so, there are still a lot of melodic landscapes there to explore. Put together, this progression both came and felt very natural to us, once the new material started to take shape."

— Miseration

The band's third album, Tragedy Has Spoken, was released in 2012. Their first album in ten years, Black Miracles and Dark Wonders, was released on 22 April 2022.

== Lyrical themes ==
Brian Sweeney of Metal Review wrote "There has been some debate over whether Miseration is a Christian band. "Most of the music and lyrics were written by guitarist Jani Stefanovic (Divinefire, Essence of Sorrow) for a band called Renascent, which he co-founded, then quit early on, taking his songs with him to Miseration. Stefanovic is a big-time Christian, along with everybody else in the band except vocalist Alvestam. So, in deference to the singer’s absence of faith, songwriter Stefanovic toned down what might have otherwise been mega-Christian lyrics to thinly veiled Christian lyrics. But they’re technically in the realm of religio-neutrality. Technically."

== Members ==
Current

- Christian Älvestam (2006–present) – lead vocals
- Jani Stefanovic (2006–2010, 2011–present) – lead guitar, bass, drums, rhythm guitar

Former

- Tobias Alpadie (2010–2011) – lead guitar
- Johan Ylenstrand (2006–2011) – bass guitar
- Rolf "Stuka" Pilve (2006–2011) – drums
- Marcus "Skägget" Bertilsson (2006–2019) – rhythm guitar
- Oskar Nilsson (2011–2019) – drums
- Christian Lundgren (2012–2019) – bass guitar

Timeline

== Discography ==
- Your Demons – Their Angels (2007)
- The Mirroring Shadow (2009)
- Tragedy Has Spoken (2012)
- Black Miracles and Dark Wonders (2022)
