= Divinefire =

Christian power metal band

- Origin: Sweden, Finland
- Genres: Christian metal, power metal, symphonic metal
- Years active: 2004–present
- Labels: King Records; Rivel Records
- Members: Jani Stefanovic; Christian Liljegren; Germán Pascual
- Past members: Torbjörn Weinesjö
- Website: www.divinefire.net

Divinefire is a Christian metal group founded in the spring of 2004 by Finnish guitarist Jani Stefanovic, and Swedish singer Christian Liljegren. Liljegren is the current frontman of the band Narnia.

The group signed a contract with King Records, in Japan and proceeded to release their first album, Glory Thy Name on 18 December 2004. One month later it was released in Western countries by Rivel Records, Christian Liljegren's label.

Their style mixes power metal with both melodic and aggressive elements.

They have also had many special guest musicians on their albums. Among them have been Carl Johan Grimmark of Narnia and Eric Clayton of Saviour Machine.

== Members ==
Current members

- Jani Stefanovic – drums, guitar, keyboard
- Christian Liljegren – vocals
- Germán Pascual – vocals

Former

- Torbjörn Weinesjö – guitar
- Andreas Olsson – bass, backing vocals

Guest musicians

- Pontus Norgren
- Thomas Vikström
- Maria Rådsten
- Fredrik Sjöholm
- Carl Johan Grimmark
- Eric Clayton
- Hubertus Liljegren

== Discography ==
=== Studio albums ===
- Glory Thy Name (2004)
- Hero (2005)
- Into a New Dimension (2006)
- Farewell (2008)
- Eye of the Storm (2011)
