= Mehida =

Finnish melodic rock/metal band

- Origin: Finland
- Genres: Melodic rock melodic metal progressive metal
- Years active: 2006–2009
- Labels: Napalm
- Members: Mikko Harkin; Markus Niemispelto; Toni Mäki-Leppilampi; Henning Ramseth; Olli Tanttu; Thomas Vikström
- Past members: Jani Stefanovic, Jarno Rautio
- Website: mehida.net

Mehida was a Finnish melodic rock and metal band formed by ex-Sonata Arctica keyboardist Mikko Harkin. Other band members are Markus Niemispelto (drums), Henning Ramseth (guitar), Olli Tanttu (guitar), Toni Mäki-Leppilampi (bass) and Thomas Vikström (Therion, Stormwind, ex-Candlemass) on vocals. Mehida's first album, Blood & Water, was released in Finland on Aug. 22, 2007, in Europe on August 31, 2007, and in the U.S. on September 11, 2007, by Napalm Records.

During the week of August 27, 2007, Blood & Water hit No. 23 on Finland's top 40 charts. In 2008, the band finished recording a new album. Shortly afterward, the band's second and final album, The Eminent Storm, was released in 2009, after which Mehida became inactive.

== Discography ==
- Blood & Water (Napalm, 2007)
- The Eminent Storm (Bullroser Records, 2009)
