= Light Unseen =

- Origin: San Marcos, Texas, United States
- Genres: Death metal; Christian metal; Grindcore; Deathgrind; Brutal death metal
- Years active: 2016-present
- Labels: Nosral Recordings; Rottweiler Records
- Members: Shun Marthiljohni; Adrian Trevino
- Website: Light Unseen on Facebook

Light Unseen is an American death metal and grindcore band founded in San Marcos, Texas, United States, by local genre veteran Christian "Shun" Marthiljohni of Diminished, Southern Front and the Monk. He hired his friend Adrian Trevino to take over drums. The band signed with Nosral Recordings in January 2018, has been compared to Tortured Conscience and Antidemon and is signed to Rottweiler Records.

== History ==
Light Unseen began in July 2016, with the lineup of Christian "Shun" Marthiljohni on vocals, guitars and bass and Adrian Trevino on drums. It debuted with the single "Imago Dei", which was released independently. Following the release of the single, it released a demo on November 17, with the title Eve of the Day of the Lord: Demo 2017, which included three tracks - "Imago Dei", "Corpus Christi" and "Eve of the Day of the Lord".

On January 27, 2018, Light Unseen signed with Nosral Recordings, a Christian label whose roster also included Symphony of Heaven, Ascending King and Outrage A.D., and announced the debut album's release. September 2018 saw them joining on a festival called Triple Threat 666, several other local artists. Following this performance, it officially released the debut single, a rerecorded version of "Corpus Christi", on November 28, 2018. It released its first album, Visions of Archetype and Apocalypse, through Nosral Recordings on December 14, 2018. The album was fairly well received.

On January 27, 2019, Light Unseen was a special guest on the Hasten Revelation tour, alongside Halcyon Way, Taking the Head of Goliath, Abated Mass of Flesh, A Hill to Die Upon and Death Requisite. On July 3 and 4, it drove to Audiofeed Music Festival to perform alongside several acts, including labelmates Symphony of Heaven, Gold Frankincense and Myrrh and Gnashing of Teeth. As of July 2019, it is working on its sophomore album. On November 30, 2020, it signed with Rottweiler Records, home to Brotality, Skald in Veum and fellow Nosral alumnus Symphony of Heaven.

== Members ==
Current

- Christian "Master Shun" Marthiljohni - Vocals, Guitars, Bass (2016–present)
- Adrian Trevino - Drums (2016–present)

== Discography ==
Studio albums

- Visions of Archetype and Apocalypse (2018; Nosral Recordings)

Demos

- Eve of the Day of the Lord: Demo 2017 (2017; independent)

Singles

- "Imago Dei" (2017; independent)
- "Eve if the Day of the Lord" (2020; Rottweiler Records)
