= Shadow Puncher =

Death metal band

- Origin: Trondheim, Norway
- Genres: Brutal death metal; death metal; Christian metal; groove metal; extreme metal; unblack metal
- Years active: 2016–present
- Labels: Independent, Nosral Recordings
- Members: Max Kevin Ølstøren
- Website: Shadow Puncher on Facebook

Shadow Puncher is a death metal project that began in 2016 as a solo project of Max Kevin Ølstøren. The band began as a death metal/black metal project out of Trondheim, Norway, releasing demos with hand-drawn art. The band was signed to Nosral Recordings.

== History ==
Shadow Puncher began in 2016, formed by Max Kevin Ølstøren, and began releasing demos. The band released three independent EPs, titled The Path of Challenges, The Throne of Justice and Love and No Despair all through SoundCloud and YouTube. On 13 October 2017, it was announced that the project had signed to Nosral Recordings, a label formed by Mike Larson of Frost Like Ashes, which began as a sub-label of Rottweiler Records. In 2018, the band began to record their fourth EP, a self-titled EP. Before the EP was released, the band debut the single, "Shekinah" as a lyric video. The EP came out on 24 February 2018. The EP was produced by Luke Dinan of Children of Wrath and DinaSound Productions, which gave the EP a better produced sound than previous efforts. The EP received mixed to positive reviews. The project and label announced on 20 August 2018, that they were releasing a compilation of all three independent EPs titled One Path to the Heavenly Kingdom.

The project is currently working on their first full-length album, a cover of Cannibal Corpse with Symphony of Heaven, a song coming on a compilation between The Bearded Dragon Productions and Love Your Enemies Records, and will appear on a split album of Symphony of Heaven, Bismoth, and Timōrātus, providing backing vocals for the final band. The band will also be releasing a cover of "We Wish You a Merry Christmas" through The Bearded Dragon Productions and Rottweiler Records.

However, in 2019, the band would depart from the label and release material on their own. The Cannibal Corpse cover would not be released, three full-lengths, 777, To Victory We March, and All Glory to the King of the Kings and the Lord of the Lords, would be released. An EP, titled The Almighty Exorcist, which featured Abated Mass of Flesh vocalist Matt Plunkett and Come to Pass vocalist Nick Wiser.

== Influences ==
Shadow Puncher is influenced by several bands, most notably Metallica, Pantera, Sepultura, Dimmu Borgir, Broken Flesh, Abominable Putridity, Rings of Saturn, Antestor, and Grave Declaration. However, reviews have compared him to Dominator Et Sanctum, and Abated Mass of Flesh.

== Members ==
- Max Kevin Ølstøren – unclean vocals, guitars, bass, drums (2016–present)

== Discography ==
EPs

- The Path of Challenges (2017)
- The Throne of Justice and Love (2017)
- No Despair (2017)
- Shadow Puncher (2018)
- The Almighty Exorcist (2019)

Studio albums

- All Glory to the King of the Kings and the Lord of the Lords (2019)
- To Victory We March (2019)
- 777 (2019)

Compilation

- One Path to the Heavenly Kingdom (2018)

Singles

- "Evil Dead" (2019)
- "Where o death...?" (2019)
- "Knowledge" (2019)
- "Strength" (2019)
