= Cruentis =

Canadian progressive black metal band

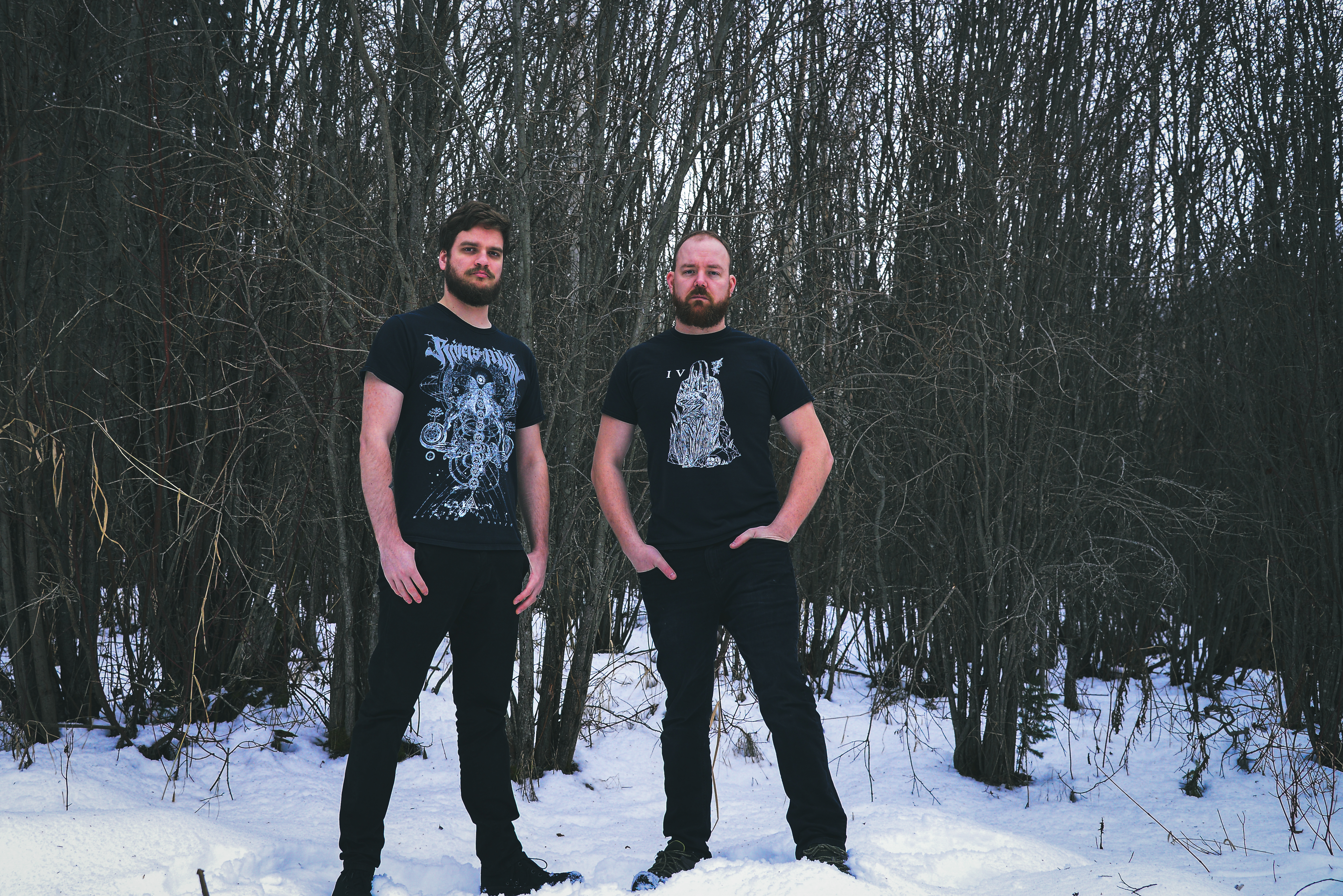
- Cruentis in 2021

Background information
- Origin: Quesnel, British Columbia, Canada
- Genres: Progressive metal, Post-metal, black metal, unblack metal, post-black metal, Christian metal, melodic metal, melodic death metal, death metal, extreme metal
- Years active: 2012-present
- Labels: Nosral Recordings; Hagah Recordings
- Members: Jesse Dean; Tyler DeMerchant
- Past members: Matt Sargent; Daniel Willsmore
- Website: Cruentis on Facebook

Cruentis is a progressive black metal band that originated out of Quesnel, British Columbia, Canada. The band began in 2012 with the lineup of Jesse Dean and Tyler DeMerchant. The band was signed with Madison, Wisconsin-based label Nosral Recordings until the label's disbandment in 2019.

== History ==
Cruentis began in 2012, between two friends Tyler DeMerchant on Vocals/Bass and Jesse Dean on Vocals/Guitars. The band added on Matt Sargent on Lead Guitars shortly afterward. The band, despite forming in 2012, remained musically silent until 2016. The band then recorded their debut album, Cold Stone, with the title track and "The Blood That Divides" being released as singles prior to the album's release. Cold Stone was released independently. Following the release of the album, they added Daniel Willsmore on drums, and recorded an EP, Dichotomy. However, following the EP's release, both Sargent and Willsmore seemingly departed from the band, leaving only founding members DeMerchant and Dean left in the band. The band would continue on as a two-piece, as both understood how to perform drums. In 2018, the band would sign with Nosral Recordings, home to bands such as Symphony of Heaven, Light Unseen, and Ascending King. Following their signing with the label, the band released their sophomore album, Alpha & Omega, with a lyric video for the title track also being released. The album received mixed to good reviews, with several sites giving a review rating of 7 or 8 out of 10. Nosral Recordings has since been disbanded, and Cruentis remains unsigned thus far. In December 2020, Cruentis signed with Hagah Recordings, a subsidiary of Rottweiler Records, joining the roster alongside Mangled Carpenter and Nosral alum INRI Immortal.

== Influences and style ==
The band have claimed several melodic death metal and black metal influences, including Kalmah, Dimmu Borgir, Amon Amarth, and Opeth. However, the band have been compared to Extol, Pantokrator, Not Beneath, At the Gates, World to Ashes, and In Flames, with comparisons of progressive metal, nu metal, doom metal, and hardcore punk.

== Members ==
Current

- Tyler DeMerchant - rhythm guitar, vocals (2012–present), lead guitar (2012, 2017–present)
- Jesse Dean - vocals, bass (2012–present)

Former

- Matt Sargent - lead guitar (2012-2018)
- Daniel Willsmore - drums (2016-2018)

Timeline

== Discography ==
Studio albums

- Cold Stone (2016)
- Alpha and Omega (2018)
- Alpha and Omega (2021; remastered)

EPs

- Dichotomy (2017)

Singles

- "Cold Stone" (2015)
- "The Blood That Divides" (2015)
- "Alpha and Omega" (2017)

Compilation appearances

- All Things Christian Extreme Metal Volume 1 (2016)
