= Taking the Head of Goliath =

American Christian death metal band

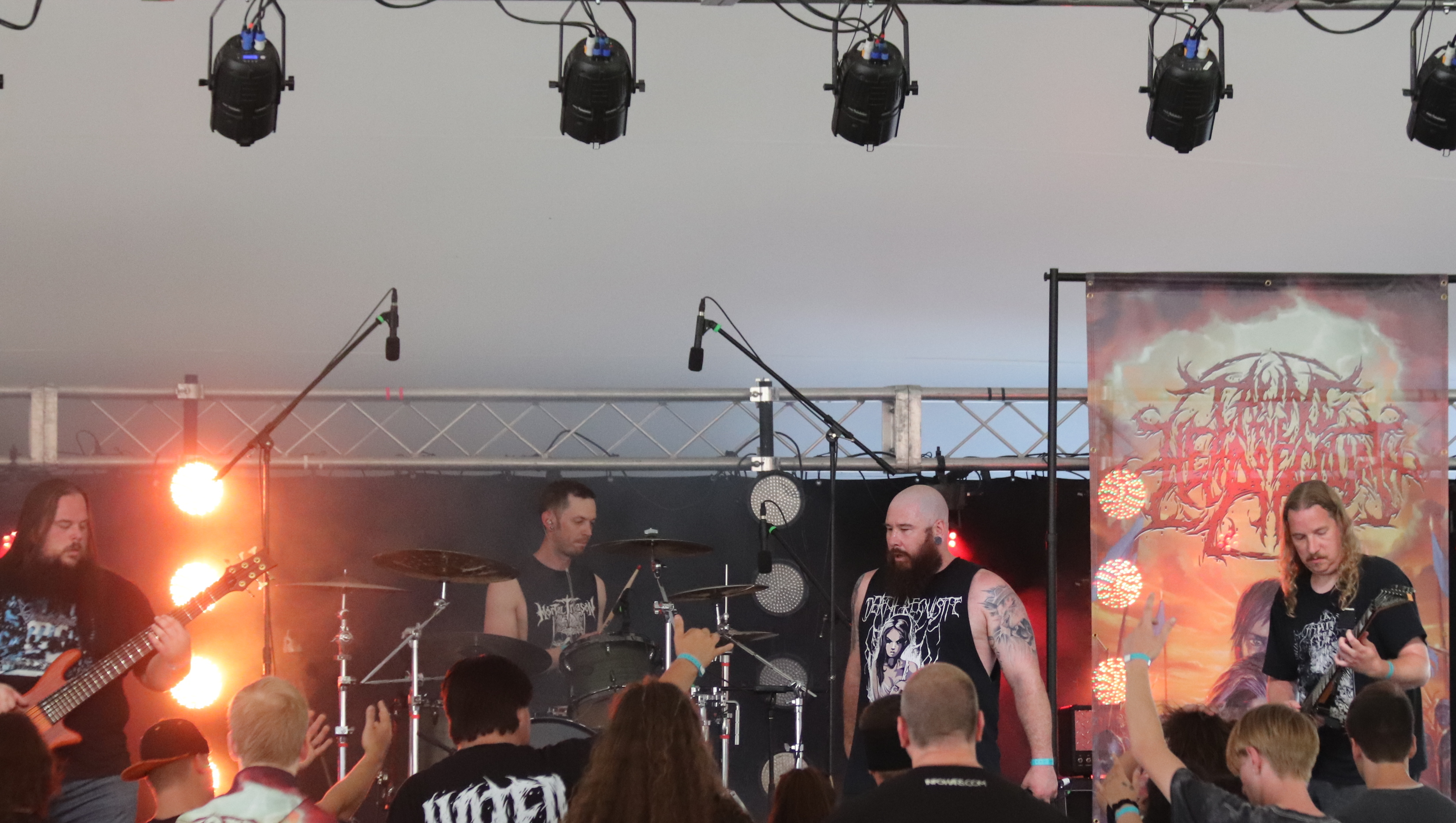
- Taking the Head of Goliath performing at Lifest in 2019

Background information
- Origin: Twin Cities, Minnesota, United States
- Genres: Christian metal, Death metal, Brutal death metal, Grind metal, Technical death metal, Extreme metal
- Years active: 2015–2023
- Label: Rottweiler
- Members: Jake Martin; Nathan Sherman; Luke Renno; Steve Reishus; Miles Sunde
- Past members: Matt Vangsgard; Rob Blake
- Website: Taking the Head of Goliath on Facebook

Taking the Head of Goliath was a Christian death metal band that originated in 2015.

== Background ==
Taking the Head of Goliath started in 2015 with members Jake Martin, Matt Vangsgard and Nathan Sherman. The band later added rhythm guitarist Rob Blake. The band became best known when they hired bassist/backing vocalist Luke Renno of the band Crimson Thorn. The band played their first show at one of For Today's final tour dates. The band has recently signed to Rottweiler Records.

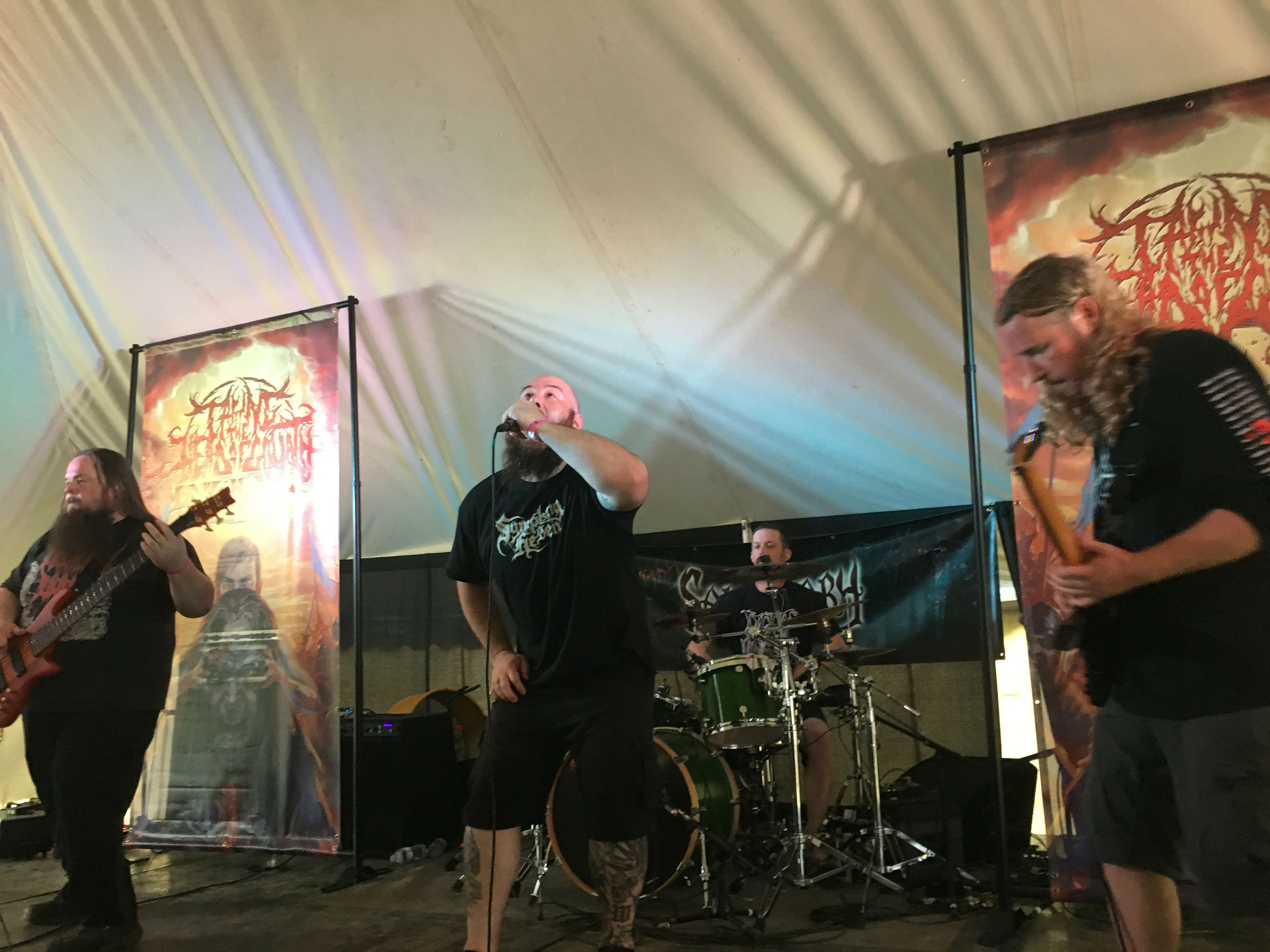
TTHOG performing at Audiofeed Festival 2019.

The band was featured on a compilation called Kill the Ill, a Benefit Compilation for Shawn Browning, owner and founder of Rottweiler. The band is currently working on a new album. Vangsgard departed from the band on October 1, 2017. The band would later announce that Steve Reishus, former Crimson Thorn drummer, had joined the band as their drummer. Over the weekend of January 25-27th, the band set out on the Hasten Revelation tour, as a four-piece, alongside A Hill to Die Upon, Death Requisite, and Abated Mass of Flesh, with supporting acts in each city including Light Unseen, The Weeping Gate, Ecclesiast, Halcyon Way, and Broken Flesh. On February 10, 2019, the band announced the departure of Blake, continuing as a four piece. Later that year, it was announced that the band would be embarking on the second annual Hasten Revelation alongside Abated Mass of Flesh, Broken Flesh, Cardiac Rupture, and Crimson Thorn on March 7–14, 2020. On September 11, 2019, it was announced that the band had a new single coming soon, titled “Cord Of Three Strands”, which would debut on October 4, 2019. The track was leaked a few days before release, but officially released on October 4, 2019. On November 15, 2019, the band would play a show with Terrorizer, Nile, Glutton For Punishment, and Coffinrot. My Place Was Taken joined the Hasten Revelation tour, replacing Broken Flesh in the lineup. On August 30, 2020, the band announced that they added on second guitarist and another Crimson Thorn member, Miles Sunde, to the lineup, with the band currently working on their debut album, Futility of the Flesh.

On March 18, 2023, the band announced they had broken up.

On August 23, 2024, over a year after the band had broken up, they announced their Futility of the Flesh EP would be released on October 25.

== Name ==
The band explained the name of the band in an interview with The Metal Resource.

This name, Taking The Head Of Goliath, represents relentless faith in the power of God alone, fearless obedience to our calling and absolute trust in Him for victory. Like all Old Testament narratives, it is prophetic and points directly to Christ.

== Members ==
Final Lineup

- Jake Martin - vocals (2015–2023) (Devitalize, Broken Flesh)
- Nathan Sherman - guitar (2015–2023) (S.B.I.)
- Miles Sunde - guitars (2020–2023) (Crimson Thorn, ex-Axehead Inc., Obadiah)
- Luke Renno - bass, backing vocals (2016–2023) (Crimson Thorn, ex-Axehead Inc., Obadiah, ex-Altruist, ex-Temple of Perdition)
- Steve Reishus - drums (2017–2023) (Crimson Thorn, ex-Temple of Perdition)

Former

- Matt Vangsgard - drums (2015–2017) (ex-Fistbate)
- Rob Blake - guitar (2016–2019)

Timeline

== Discography ==
EPs

- Taking the Head of Goliath (2018)
- Futility of the Flesh (2024)

Live Albums

- Beyond Brutal Live (2017)

Singles

- “Cord of Three Strands“ (2019)
