= Second Death (disambiguation) =

Second death most commonly refers to an eschatological concept in Judaism and Christianity.

Second death may also refer to:

== Film ==
- Second Death Star, the second construction of the Death Star, a fictional mobile space station and galactic superweapon featured in the Star Wars space opera franchise
- The Second Death (2000), an Irish short film by John Michael McDonagh

== Music ==
- Ending Themes (On the Two Deaths of Pain of Salvation), a live album and documentary by Swedish progressive metal band Pain of Salvation, released in 2009
- Second Death (EP), the fourth EP by the extreme metal band Death Requisite, released in 2013
