= Ignominy =

Ignominy may refer to:

- "Ignominy", part two of the 1944 Lao She novel Four Generations Under One Roof
- "Ignomínia" (English: Ignominy), a poem in the 2006 Conceição Lima collection A Dolorosa Raiz do Micondó
- "Ignominy", song on the 2015 Broken Flesh album Broken Flesh

== See also ==
- Shame
- Humiliation
