= Children of Wrath =

Children of Wrath may refer to:

- Children of Wrath (band), a Christian symphonic death metal band from Phoenix, Arizona
- Children of Wrath (Fear the Walking Dead), an episode of the television series Fear the Walking Dead
