= The Omen King =

Studio album by Abated Mass of Flesh
- Released: June 10, 2014
- Recorded: 2013–2014
- Genre: Deathcore
- Length: 22:25
- Label: Rottweiler
- Producer: Jordan Casey

Abated Mass of Flesh chronology
The Anatomy of Impurity (2013)	The Omen King (2014)	Deathcrusher (2014)

Professional ratings
Review scores
Source	Rating
The Metal Resource	7/10
Metal Injection	8/10
Sputnikmusic	3/5

The Omen King is the debut album by the deathcore band, Abated Mass of Flesh.

== Critical reception ==
John Jackson of The Metal Resource wrote "This is one of those albums that leave you exhausted at the end. Despite clocking in at 22 minutes, the serving size is plenty large. The first few times I listen to the album, I had no idea it was only 22 minutes because it's tough to listen to and as happens in this genre, some of the songs tend to sound very similar, so I hadn't realized I was going back through the album. Those looking for something extreme will find it here and I highly recommend driving around with this blasting and your car windows down. Maybe even stopping to get gas and keeping this playing at full volume with windows down and door open. The looks you'll get will be priceless and entertaining, possibly even leading to great conversations. So often, this genre ends up just being painful noise, but AMOF have managed to infect some (gasp) melody and structure and almost groove at times into some of the songs, helping this album stand out from others. The Omen King reminds me of the toughest shows in the pit where you're having the time of your life but inside you can't help but hope the band stops playing soon before you crumble into a ball of flesh, maybe even an Abated Mass of Flesh." Metal Injection reported "Overall, the album is a really strong, solid release from a seriously underrated band and is for fans of Human Mastication and Aborted, and deserves an 8/10."

== Track listing ==
No.	Title	Length
1.	"New Creation"	0:18
2.	"Gather in Strength"	3:06
3.	"Saul I Am"	1:29
4.	"Iniquitous Decimation"	2:05
5.	"Mouth of the Tomb"	1:45
6.	"The Killer in Me"	2:20
7.	"Rise from Hell"	3:04
8.	"Deadland"	3:25
9.	"The Omen King"	1:45
10.	"Vital Extrication"	3:08
Total length:		22:25

== Personnel ==
Abated Mass of Flesh

- Matt Plunkett – lead vocals, keyboards
- Zach Plunkett – guitar, backing vocals
- Logan Hayworth – bass
- Kade Dodson – drums

Guest musicians

- Jacob Mathes (ex-Broken Flesh) – guest vocals on "Vital Extrication"

Production

- Jordan Casey – production, engineering, mixing, mastering
