= Warbound (album) =

Studio album by Broken Flesh
- Released: June 10, 2013
- Recorded: 2012–2013
- Genre: Death metal, deathcore, Christian metal
- Length: 25:03
- Label: Luxor
- Producer: Provo Provenzano

Broken Flesh chronology
Stripped, Stabbed, and Crucified (2012)	Warbound (2013)	Broken Flesh (2015)

Warbound is the second album by Christian death metal band Broken Flesh.

== Critical reception ==
Professional ratings
Review scores
Source	Rating
The Metal Resource	8/10

The Metal Resource writes, "As a band, the performances on this album are great. Many bands in this genre end up with all their songs sounding the same by the time everything is put together, but that is not the case here, which makes this a good listen. Guitar riffs are fast and show good variety; the drumming shows great speed as one would expect in the genre, but also some great variety fills, tempo changes, and double bass work; vocals are not simply all guttural death metal style and are delivered with a sense of strength; and even the bass guitar that is often largely absent from the mix in this genre contributes to the overall sound."

== Artwork and concept ==
When asked in an interview with HM Magazine if Warbound was a concept album, Guitarist Kevin Tubby replied

There's really not a main theme around the record, but the theme around the title track is about the return of Christ as he's portrayed in Revelation 20. The way he comes back with varnished bronze skin, with white shining from the holes in his hands and side, with fire in his eyes and crowns upon his head, with a robe dipped in blood, riding on a white horse. We kind of added our imagination, and got hooked up with this really awesome artist name Jon Zig and he put it together for us.

== Track listing ==
No.	Title	Length
1.	"Acrid Stench"	2:40
2.	"Once Dead"	2:53
3.	"Scorned"	2:30
4.	"Warbound"	3:05
5.	"Possession"	3:00
6.	"Demon Seed"	3:42
7.	"15:55"	2:34
8.	"Kill Me Now"	4:39
Total length:		25:03

== Personnel ==
Broken Flesh

- Jacob Mathes – vocals
- Josh Mathes – bass, vocals
- Steve Giddens – guitar
- Kevin Tubby – guitar, vocals
- Brandon Lopez – drums

Production

- Provo Provenzano – producer, mastering, engineer, mixing
- Jon Zig – artwork
