= My Heart to Fear =

American metalcore band

- Origin: Williamsport, Pennsylvania, U.S.
- Genres: Metalcore
- Years active: 2005–present
- Labels: Solid State, Luxor
- Members: Trevor Pool; James Cameron; Matt Giudice; Dan Pugh
- Past members: Jay Graham; Brandon Vartenisian; Taylor Pool; Dale Upright
- Website: myhearttofear.net

My Heart to Fear was an American metalcore band from Williamsport, Pennsylvania. The band started making music in 2008, with lead vocalist Trevor Pool, lead guitarist Dale Upright, rhythm guitarist Brandon Vartenisian, bass guitarist Taylor Pool, and drummer Luke Brady. The band released one independently made album, Invictus, in 2009, along with two independent extended plays, A Ship Built to Sink, in 2010, and My Heart to Fear, in 2011. They signed with Solid State Records, where they released, Lost Between Brilliance and Insanity, an extended play, in 2012. Their first album, Algorithm, released by the label in 2013.

== Background ==
My Heart to Fear is a metal band from Williamsport, Pennsylvania. Their members at its inception was lead vocalist, Trevor Pool, lead guitarist and vocalist, Dale Upright, rhythm guitarist, Brandon Vartenisian, bass guitarist and vocalist, Taylor Pool, and drummer, Matt Guidace. Brandon Vartenisian left the band in October 2010 to play for An Early Ending. Jay Graham left the band in April 2015 to relocate with his wife to Missouri. Dale Upright was asked to leave after making several comments on abortion on social media, which had resulted in backlash from fans and forced the band to ask him to leave.

== Music history ==
The band commenced as a musical entity in 2008, with their first release, Invictus, that released independently in 2009. The album's cover and CD art is featured on the site CDROM2GO. They released two independent made extended plays, A Ship Built to Sink, in 2010, and My Heart to Fear, in 2011. They signed to Solid State Records, where they released another extended play, Lost Between Brilliance and Insanity, in 2012. Their first studio album, Algorithm, released on July 9, 2013, by Solid State Records. The band released a Facebook update stating they have an upcoming EP, entitled The Draft due to be released in 2016. The band signed to Luxor Records and announced releasing The Draft on August 26, 2016. The band then went on tour with It Lies Within to promote the EP.

== Members ==
Current

- Trevor Pool – vocals (2005–present)
- Dan Pugh – guitars (2019–present), rhythm guitar (2015–2019)
- James Cameron – bass guitar (2017–present)
- Matthew Guidace – Drums (2017–Present)

Former

- Dale Upright – lead guitar (2005–2019)
- Brandon Vartenisian – rhythm guitar (2005–2010)
- Jay Graham – rhythm guitar (2010–2015)
- Luke Brady – drums (2005–2017)
- Taylor Pool – bass guitar (2005–2016)

Timeline

== Discography ==
Studio albums

- Invictus (January 8, 2009, Independent)
- Algorithm (July 9, 2013, Solid State)

EPs

- A Ship Built to Sink (2010, independent)
- My Heart to Fear (2011, Independent)
- Into The Maelstrom (2012, Independent)
- Lost Between Brilliance and Insanity (2012, Solid State)
- The Draft (2016, Luxor)

Singles

- "You've Been Distant Lately" (2016, Luxor)
