= Dynasty (As They Sleep album) =

Studio album by As They Sleep
- Released: November 23, 2010
- Recorded: 2010
- Genre: Melodic death metal, deathcore
- Length: 37:50
- Label: Solid State Records
- Producer: Nick Morris

As They Sleep chronology
Blacken the Sun (2008)	Dynasty (2010)	The Hallowed Abstract (TBD)

Professional ratings
Review scores
Source	Rating
Metal Underground	3.5/5 stars
Indie Vision Music	4/5 stars
Jesus Freak Hideout	4.5/5 stars
Total Deathcore	3.5/5 stars
Sputnik Music	4.5/5 stars

Dynasty is the second album by the extreme metal band As They Sleep. The album is the first to feature drummer Tony Lukitsh.

== Critical reception ==
Nick Habisch of Sputnik Music states: "Overall, As They Sleep has released a very solid Death Metal album. Encasing melody and brutality within the same set of songs, the band puts out a very talented and engaging album, sure to please fans of bands such as The Black Dahlia Murder, or other related acts. I highly recommend Dynasty, and it will become a staple of my collection for quite some time." He gave the album a 4.5 Star rating out of 5 Stars.

Steve at Indie Vision Music says: "This is one of the best pure metal albums released this year. It is hard to believe that a band with this much talent could slip through the cracks for so long, but they are here now and ready to kick your teeth in. With the pummeling drums to the nasty riffs, Dynasty lays a good old-fashioned beat down on you. If you love death metal, do yourself a favor and go buy this album when it comes out on Monday November 22." He gave the album 4 Stars out of 5.

== Concept and lyrical themes ==
Dynasty is concept album. As stated by Vocalist Aaron Bridgewater, the album talks about the rise and fall of ancient civilizations up to present time. The song "The Third Reich", for instance, talks about Adolf Hitler's squadron and how they massacred many people in their strikes. The song "To the Republic" talks about the United States Economy and far the Government has fallen from God.

== Track listing ==
Dynasty track listing
No.	Title	Length
1.	"Oracle of the Dead"	3:23
2.	"To the Republic"	3:52
3.	"The Third Reich"	3:43
4.	"Bedlam at the Nile"	4:07
5.	"The Darkest Ages"	4:45
6.	"Ritual"	1:30
7.	"The Offering"	3:11
8.	"Attila"	3:11
9.	"Poseidon"	3:45
10.	"God of War"	2:49
11.	"The Unseen"	3:34

== Credits ==
As They Sleep

- Aaron Bridgewater – vocals
- Nick Morris – guitars, producer, engineer
- Barry Gomez – guitars
- Derek Kosiba – bass
- Tony Lukitsh – drums

Production

- Troy Glessner – mastering
- Ronn Miller – mixing assistant
- Jason Suecof – mixing

Art

- Ryan Clark – design
- Jerad Knudson – photography
