= Lost Between Brilliance and Insanity =

EP by My Heart to Fear
- Released: December 4, 2012
- Genre: Christian metal, metalcore, progressive metal
- Length: 17:30
- Label: Solid State

My Heart to Fear chronology
My Heart to Fear (2011)	Lost Between Brilliance and Insanity (2012)	Algorithm (2013)

Lost Between Brilliance and Insanity is the third extended play from My Heart to Fear. Solid State Records released the album on December 4, 2012.

== Critical reception ==
Professional ratings
Review scores
Source	Rating
About.com	3/5 stars
Exclaim!	4/10
HM Magazine	3/5 stars
Indie Vision Music	4/5 stars
Jesus Freak Hideout	4/5 stars
Louder Than the Music	3.5/5 stars

Rating the EP four out of ten at Exclaim!, Bradley Zorgdrager writes, "My Heart to Fear could use a heavy dose of Ritalin." Tony D. Bryant, giving the EP three stars from HM Magazine, says, "it shows glimpses of things to come." Awarding the EP four stars for Jesus Freak Hideout, Kevin Hoskins states, "the drums move at a ridiculous pace, the guitars practically fly off the handle, and the combination of growls and singing make for a sound similar to Haste The Day."

Todd Lyons, giving the EP four stars for About.com, states, "With all their flashes of interesting, solid musicianship especially from Taylor Pool’s keyboard fills, the EP wrestles itself above a raggedy demo presentation, but threatens to cave in under the weight of its overtly obvious message." Rating the EP three and a half stars at Louder Than the Music, Jono Davies says, "This is most definitely a real metal fans, metal EP!" Brody B., awarding the EP four stars from Indie Vision Music, writes, "While the disk has a few minor flaws, it still keeps me optimistic about what these guys have to offer as they continue to grow."

== Track listing ==
No.	Title	Length
1.	"Blood Money"	3:36
2.	"Life Under the Stairs"	3:13
3.	"Legends Never Die"	3:23
4.	"Dear Mr. White"	3:14
5.	"The Witching Hour"	4:04
Total length:		17:30
