= Children of Wrath (band) =

- Also known as: Luke Dinan
- Origin: Phoenix, Arizona, US
- Genres: Christian metal; Symphonic metal; Death metal; Symphonic death metal; Unblack metal
- Years active: 2017-present
- Labels: Independent, Nosral Recordings, Vision of God Records (affiliated)
- Members: Luke Dinan
- Website: www.childrenofwrath.com

Children of Wrath is a Christian symphonic death metal from Phoenix, Arizona. The project describes his sound as Blackened Melodic Symphonic Holy Death metal.

== History ==
Luke Dinan formed the project of Children of Wrath in Phoenix, Arizona. The name comes from a line in Ephesians 2:3. In June 2017, he released his debut album, titled No Flesh Spared. By July, Children of Wrath signed to Nosral Recordings, alongside Symphony of Heaven. The label re-released No Flesh Spared on August 24, 2017, with new artwork. Soon after the re-release, he began working on his sophomore album, Supernatural Dimensions. In the same post, he shared that there would be a preview of the album, simply titled The First 10 Minutes. In the meantime, he also masters other band's material, including Symphony of Heaven, Ascending King, and The Beckoning, under the name of DinaSound. In January 2018, an original song Dinan scored was a part of a Star Wars fan film, and was released via The Bearded Dragon Productions.

== Style ==
Many sites have compared Children of Wrath to that of Satyricon, Dimmu Borgir, Cradle of Filth, and Opeth. The site Jesus Freak Hideout, however, compared him to Extol and Zao. The band plays several different genres of metal, which is why he stylized his genre as Blackened Melodic Symphonic Holy Death Metal.

== Discography ==
Studio albums

- No Flesh Spared (2017; Nosral Recordings)
- Supernatural Dimensions (2018; Nosral Recordings)
- 3 (2023; Independent)

Preview

- The Ten 10 Minutes (2017)

Compilation appearances

- Nosral Sampler #1 (2017; Nosral Recordings)
- Metal From The Dragon (Vol. 2) (2017; The Bearded Dragon Productions)

Singles

- Sith Hunt: A Star Wars Story (2018; The Bearded Dragon Productions)
