= Broken Flesh (album) =

Studio album by Broken Flesh
- Released: September 4, 2015
- Recorded: February 2015
- Genre: Brutal death metal
- Length: 34:49
- Label: Luxor

Broken Flesh chronology
Warbound (2013)	Broken Flesh (2015)	Beheaded in Vain (2022)

Broken Flesh is the third and final studio album from Broken Flesh. Luxor Records released the album on September 4, 2015.

== Critical reception ==
Professional ratings
Review scores
Source	Rating
About.com	3.5/5 stars
Outburn	9/10
Pure Grain Audio	6.6/10
RAM Zine	4/5 stars

Awarding the album three and a half stars for About.com, Chad Bowar states, "The album is brutally heavy, but not monotonous." Dan Slessor, rating the album a nine out of ten at Outburn, writes, the songs are "visceral in the extreme." Giving the album a 6.6 out of ten from Pure Grain Audio, Graham Finney says, "The saving grace for Broken Flesh is that, while they may be another generic brutal death metal act, their crushing heaviness is delivered with such pinpoint accuracy that long-standing fans of the genre will find plenty on this self-titled offering to keep them headbanging long into the night." Pagan Hel, indicating in a four star review by RAM Zine, describes, "Broken Flesh sure know how to engage with their skilled savagery, even if it does hold a (slight) Christian message."

== Track listing ==
All tracks are written by Broken Flesh.

No.	Title	Length
1.	"Valley of Mass Crucifixion"	2:53
2.	"Blood Harvest"	2:47
3.	"Consumed by Death"	2:34
4.	"Buried Alive"	3:07
5.	"Hell"	3:08
6.	"Cries of the Dead"	3:00
7.	"Forever in Flames"	3:10
8.	"Unworthy"	3:10
9.	"Exalt"	2:25
10.	"Ignominy"	3:12
11.	"By His Blood"	2:20
12.	"Hate"	3:03
Total length:		34:49

== Credits ==
Broken Flesh

- Brandon Lopez – drums
- Jacob Mathes – vocals
- Joshua Mathes – bass, backing vocals
- Kevin Tubby – guitar, backing vocals

Production

- Colin Davis – mastering
- Nick Morris – engineer, additional guitar
- Jon Zig – artwork, layout
