= Blacken the Sun =

Studio album by As They Sleep
- Released: October 28, 2008
- Recorded: 2008
- Genre: Metalcore, death metal, melodic death metal
- Length: 46:23
- Label: Luxor Records
- Producer: Nick Morris

As They Sleep chronology
As They Sleep (2005)	Blacken the Sun (2008)	Dynasty (2010)

Blacken the Sun is the debut album by extreme metal band, As They Sleep. They have been compared to Lamb of God and The Black Dahlia Murder.

== Track listing ==
No.	Title	Length
1.	"Dusk"	1:58
2.	"A Thousand Deaths"	4:00
3.	"Companion of the Fire"	5:09
4.	"Pangaea"	5:02
5.	"Sins 'N Needles"	4:27
6.	"Seeds of Hate"	3:33
7.	"Sweet Misery"	5:32
8.	"Hollow"	4:20
9.	"Revelations"	3:03
10.	"Blacken the Sun"	5:06
11.	"Dawn"	4:13

== Credits ==
As They Sleep

- Aaron Bridgewater – vocals
- Paul Burrett – drums
- Barry Gomez – guitars
- Derek Kosiba – bass
- Nick Morris – guitars, production, mixing

Additional musicians

- Steve Longworth – piano

Production

- Colin Davis – mastering
- Kingsley – photography
