= Algorithm (My Heart to Fear album) =

Studio album by My Heart to Fear
- Released: July 9, 2013
- Genres: Christian metal, metalcore, progressive metal
- Length: 42:10
- Label: Solid State

My Heart to Fear chronology
Lost Between Brilliance and Insanity (2012)	Algorithm (2013)

Algorithm is the first studio album from My Heart to Fear. Solid State Records released the album on July 9, 2013.

== Critical reception ==
Professional ratings
Review scores
Source	Rating
About.com	4/5 stars
Alternative Press	3/5 stars
Exclaim!	5/10
HM Magazine	4.5/5 stars
Indie Vision Music	4/5 stars
Jesus Freak Hideout	3.5/5 stars
Mind Equals Blown	8.5/10

Awarding the album three stars from Alternative Press, Jason Schreurs writes, "As is the case with the bulk of this musical style, the vocals bring it back down to a near-mediocre level." Bradley Zorgdrager, rating the album a five out of ten for Exclaim!, says, "Unfortunately, a lack of inspiration causes the songs to come undone, as many of the parts sound only like a means to get to the next." Giving the album four stars at About.com, Todd Lyons states, "everything binds together into one masterful meditation." Tim Dodderidge, indicating in an 8.5 out of ten review by Mind Equals Blown, writes, "From start to finish, My Heart to Fear’s debut full-length is an energetic, ferocious, cathartic and inspiring metal album."

Kevin Hoskins, giving the album three and a half stars for Jesus Freak Hideout, describes, "this is just metal done well ... but any hardcore fan will be digging this release all summer long." Awarding the album four and a half stars from HM Magazine, Sean Huncherick states, "One good thing about Algorithm is that the band realizes they don’t need to constantly play as fast as they can." Brody B., rating the album four star at Indie Vision Music, writes, "With a few minor tweaks here and there that could have made songs feel more fleshed out I would have had a hard time finding fault with this debut record."

== Track listing ==
No.	Title	Length
1.	"Dust to Dust" (featuring Ricky Armellino of This or the Apocalypse)	4:55
2.	"414 Days"	3:10
3.	"Angst"	3:08
4.	"The Sneaking Chair"	3:32
5.	"Algorithm"	3:43
6.	"The Witching Hour Pt. II"	3:30
7.	"Wish You Were Here"	4:13
8.	"End Transmission"	4:16
9.	"Bottomed Out"	3:32
10.	"4th Dimension Opera House"	4:10
11.	"Pack Up, We're Moving"	4:01
Total length:		42:10
