= Broken Flesh =

American Christian metal band

- Origin: Oklahoma City, Oklahoma
- Genres: Brutal death metal
- Years active: 2004–2023, 2026–present
- Labels: Luxor, Sullen, Warclub
- Members: Kevin Tubby
- Past members: Jacob Mathes; Ricky Puckett; Brandon Lopez; Bryan Nikkel; Jake Martin; Ronald Ramsey; Dakota Whiteside; Steve Maxwell; Steve Giddens; Joshua Mathes; Roy Limon; James Hendrix; Taylor Strader; Kyle Fitzgerald
- Website: Broken Flesh on Facebook

Broken Flesh is a Christian death metal band, formed in Oklahoma City, Oklahoma, in 2004. The band released three studio albums, Forever In Flames in 2009, Warbound in 2013, and Broken Flesh in 2015. They released one extended play, Stripped, Stabbed, and Crucified, in 2012.

== History ==
The band formed in 2004, with their members being lead vocalist, Jacob Mathes, lead guitarist and background vocalist, Kevin Tubby, rhythm guitarist Dakota Whiteside, bassist and background vocalist, Joshua Mathes, and drummer, Brandon Lopez.

Their first studio album, Forever in Flames, was released in 2009, by Sullen Records. The extended play, Stripped, Stabbed, and Crucified, was independently released in 2012. Their subsequent studio album, Warbound, was released in 2013, from Luxor Records. They released, Broken Flesh, on September 4, 2015, with Luxor Records. On March 30, 2016, vocalist Jacob Mathes announced his leaving of the band.

Both Mathes and his brother Josh, played their last show at Serpent Stomp Festival with bands such as Living Sacrifice, Death Therapy, Every Knee Shall Bow, Grave Robber, Becoming Saints and White Collar Sideshow on April 23, 2016.

After the departure of the Mathes brothers, the band began searching for a replacement bassist. They found Kyle Fitzgerald and he became an official member on May 18, 2016. Fitzgerald would depart on February 25, 2017, and be replaced by Bryan Nikkel, formerly of Obliteration and Death List, on April 6, 2017. The band released a single off of their upcoming album, titled "Bloodlust" on June 23, 2017. A week later, June 30, they released "Wretched", the second single.

In mid-2019, it was announced that the band would join the second Hasten Revelation tour lineup, alongside Cardiac Rupture, Taking the Head of Goliath, Abated Mass of Flesh, and a reunited Crimson Thorn for dates set for March 7–14, 2020. The band had previously performed on the tour as a special guest, with the original lineup of Abated Mass of Flesh, Taking the Head of Goliath, Death Requisite, and A Hill to Die Upon. However, due to health problems that Tubby contracted, the band were forced to drop off of the tour. My Place Was Taken took the place of Broken Flesh on the tour. Later on, the band announced they would no longer be playing live due to Tubby having an underlying health condition. On July 12, 2021, it was announced that Jake Martin of Taking the Head of Goliath would take over vocal duties for the band, leaving Tubby to play guitar solely. On August 14, 2021, Broken Flesh played their final live show at the 89th street collective in Oklahoma City as a part of a local 2 day festival named “rayfest” in honor of deceased local music scene icon Ray Allen Duvall. Broken Flesh headlined the 2nd night, in which the show was advertised as “Broken Flesh Farewell Show”. The band has stated they will continue to be a studio oriented band from now on. On December 2, 2022, the band released Beheaded in Vain, a live album recorded from the 2021 Oklahoma show featuring six songs yet to be released in studio form along with band standards.

On November 22nd, 2024, Kevin Tubby posted on Facebook that he dissolved Broken Flesh on December 30, 2023, stating that former members "dishonored his daughters" and that continuing the band would be impossible. Two years later, Tubby announced on Facebook that the band has resumed activity, with a new lineup and with their first three albums being reissued on Vision of God Records.

== Members ==
Current lineup

- Kevin Tubby – lead guitar (2004–2023), rhythm guitar (2006−2007, 2010−2012, 2012–2015, 2016–2021), bass (2006−2007), vocals (2004−2010, 2016–2023) (formerly of Death List, formerly of Obliteration)

Live musicians

- Adam Cook – vocals (2016) (A Hill to Die Upon)

Former members

- Jacob Mathes – vocals (2013−2016), bass (2011−2013) (Strangled, formerly of Foxhound, Prophecy, Cadaverous Contingency)
- Ricky Puckett − screams (2010−2012) (In Darkest Dreams)
- Steve Maxwell − rhythm guitar, bass (2004−2006, 2008−2009)
- Steve Giddens − rhythm guitar, backing vocals (2012) (Horde Casket, formerly of Septic Devourment)
- Joshua Mathes − bass, backing vocals (2013−2016) (formerly of Becoming the Beast)
- Dakota Whiteside − rhythm guitar (2015−2016) (formerly of Romero, Horcrux)
- Roy Limon − rhythm guitar (2007)
- James Hendrix − bass (2007−2009)
- Taylor Strader − bass (2005)
- Kyle Fitzgerald – bass, backing vocals (2016−2017)
- Ronald Ramsey – bass (2022–2023)
- Bryan Nikkel – bass (2017–2023), rhythm guitars (2021–2023), backing vocals (2017–2023) (formerly of Death List, formerly of Obliteration, Eviseration)
- Brandon Lopez – drums (2004–2023) (formerly of Becoming the Archetype, Lamb Slaughter)
- Jake Martin – vocals (2019 [Live], 2021–2023) (Taking the Head of Goliath)

Timeline

== Discography ==
Studio albums

- Forever In Flames (2009, Sullen)
- Warbound (2013, Luxor)
- Broken Flesh (2015, Luxor)

EPs

- Stripped, Stabbed, and Crucified (2012, independent)

Live

- Beheaded in Vain (2022, Rottweiler)

Singles

- "Cries of the Dead" (2015)
- "Unworthy" (2015)
- "Bloodlust" (2017)
- "Wretched" (2017)
