= Crimson Thorn =

American Christian death metal band

- Origin: Minneapolis, Minnesota, U.S.
- Genres: Death metal, thrash metal
- Years active: 1991–2007, 2019–present
- Labels: R.E.X., Atomic, Bombworks, Morphine, Little Rose
- Members: Luke Renno; Miles Sunde; Steve Reishus
- Past members: Dave Quast; Dylan Jenniges; Paul Jongeward; Kevin Sundberg; Andy Kopesky; Collin Anderson; Brett Wilson

Crimson Thorn is an American Christian death metal band. According to AllMusic, they are "one of the world's most extreme-sounding Christian metal bands". Crimson Thorn has performed at Cornerstone Festival and Sonshine Festival. They have been featured in HM Magazine.

== History ==
Luke Renno, Dave Quast, Dylan Paul Jenniges, Paul Jongeward and Miles Sunde founded the band in 1991. They were ready to record their first demo when Jenniges left, and Renno took his place on bass. Their demo was titled Plagued, and was recorded in 1992 at Blue Moon Studios in Minneapolis.

After Quast left, Kevin Sundberg joined as the new drummer, and their style changed from thrash metal to death metal. Crimson Thorn signed to Atomic Records and released their first full length CD, Unearthed, in 1994. Later, R.E.X. Records re-released Unearthed. Jongeward left the band, and was replaced with Andy Kopesky before the release of Dissection in 1997 on the label Morphine Records. Little Rose Records re-released it in 1999. Purification was released after the band built their own studio in the basement of Sundberg's home.

Crimson Thorn announced at Cornerstone Festival 2007 that they were working on a new album. They performed unreleased tracks, all of which were more melodic than their previous works. Despite this, the band assured fans that the rest of the upcoming album would be heavier, like their previous works.

On July 6, 2019, it was announced that Crimson Thorn would come out of their unofficial hiatus to play a week's worth of shows in March 2020, on the Hasten Revelation Tour, alongside Broken Flesh, Abated Mass of Flesh, Taking the Head of Goliath, and Cardiac Rupture. Due to health concerns, Broken Flesh dropped off the tour, being replaced by My Place Was Taken.

== Members ==
Current members
Name	Instrument	Years	Other groups
Luke Renno	bass (1992–2005) guitar, vocals (1991–present)	1991–2007, 2019–present	Taking the Head of Goliath, Temple of Perdition, Sylvan Fortress, Axehead Inc., Obadiah
Steve Reishus	drums	2003–2007, 2019–present	Taking the Head of Goliath
Miles Sunde	guitars, backing vocals	1991–2007, 2019–present	

Former

- Dylan Paul Jenniges – bass (1991–1992)
- Dave Quast – drums (1991–1993)
- Jeff Anderson – drums (1993–1994)
- Kevin Sundberg – drums, vocals (1994–2003)
- Paul Jongeward – guitar (1991–1997)
- Andy Kopesky – guitar, keyboards (1997–2005)
- Collin Anderson – keyboards (2005–2006)
- Brett Wilson – bass, vocals (2005–2007)

Former live members

- Billy Frazer – drums

Timeline

== Discography ==
Studio albums

- Unearthed (1995)
- Dissection (1997)
- Purification (2002)

Demos

- Plagued (1993)

Compilations

- Unearthed for Dissection (2005)
- Crimson Thorn - Anthology of Brutality: 1992-2002 The Complete Collective Works (3-CD Set) (2017)

Compilation Appearances

- "Anorexia Spiritual" on A Tribute to Living Sacrifice (2001; originally performed by Living Sacrifice)

DVDs

- Live in Minneapolis (2005)
