= Outrage A.D. =

Canadian Christian metal band

- Origin: Ottawa, Ontario, Canada
- Genres: Death metal; thrash metal; Christian metal; groove metal; crossover thrash
- Years active: 1992–1995, 2013–present
- Labels: Nosral Recordings
- Members: Nick Richer; Mart Marion; Nicolas Miquelon
- Past members: Art Robillard
- Website: Outrage A.D. on Facebook

Outrage A.D., originally known as Outrage, is a Canadian Christian thrash and death metal band that originated in Ottawa, Ontario. The band began in 1992 as Outrage and eventually disbanded in 1995. In 2013, the band reunited and changed their name to Outrage A.D.

== History ==
Outrage began in 1992 with the line-up of drummer/vocalist Nick Richer, guitarist/vocalist Mart Marion, and bassist Art Robillard. The band immediately recorded a demo album, which was titled Hail God and was released independently. Following that, by 1994, the band released a second demo album, titled Waiting for the Son, which featured seven tracks of material. In 1994, following the recording on their sophomore release, Robillard departed from the band, with his brother, Phil, stepping up to take over the bass for live performances. In 1995, the band disbanded. However, many years later, in 2013, the band reunited with a new moniker. Now going by Outrage A.D., Richer and Marion reprised their positions as drummer and guitarist respectively. Neither Robillard brother returned to the band, which led the position to be filled by Nicolas Miquelon on bass. With the new line-up, the band entered the studio at Apartment 2 Recording Studio and recorded their debut studio album, New Blood. Following the release of the album, the band was featured on a compilation called Christian Brutal Death Metal, Volume 1. On October 16, 2017, it was announced that the band had signed with Nosral Recordings and were re-releasing the album through the label. In early 2018, the band released the single "New Blood", alongside a lyric video. On February 23, 2018, New Blood was re-released via Nosral Recordings. On March 6, 2019, the band released their debut music video, titled "Unreal Trip".

== Members ==
Current

- Nick Richer – vocals, drums (1992–1995, 2013–present)
- Mart Marion – vocals, guitars (1992–1995, 2013–present)
- Nicolas Miquelon – bass (2013–present)

Former

- Art Robillard – bass (1992–1994)

Live

- Phil Robillard – bass (1994–1995)

== Discography ==
Studio albums

- New Blood (2015; re-issued 2018)

Demo albums

- Hail God (1992)
- Waiting for the Son (1993)
