= Abated Mass of Flesh =

American metal band

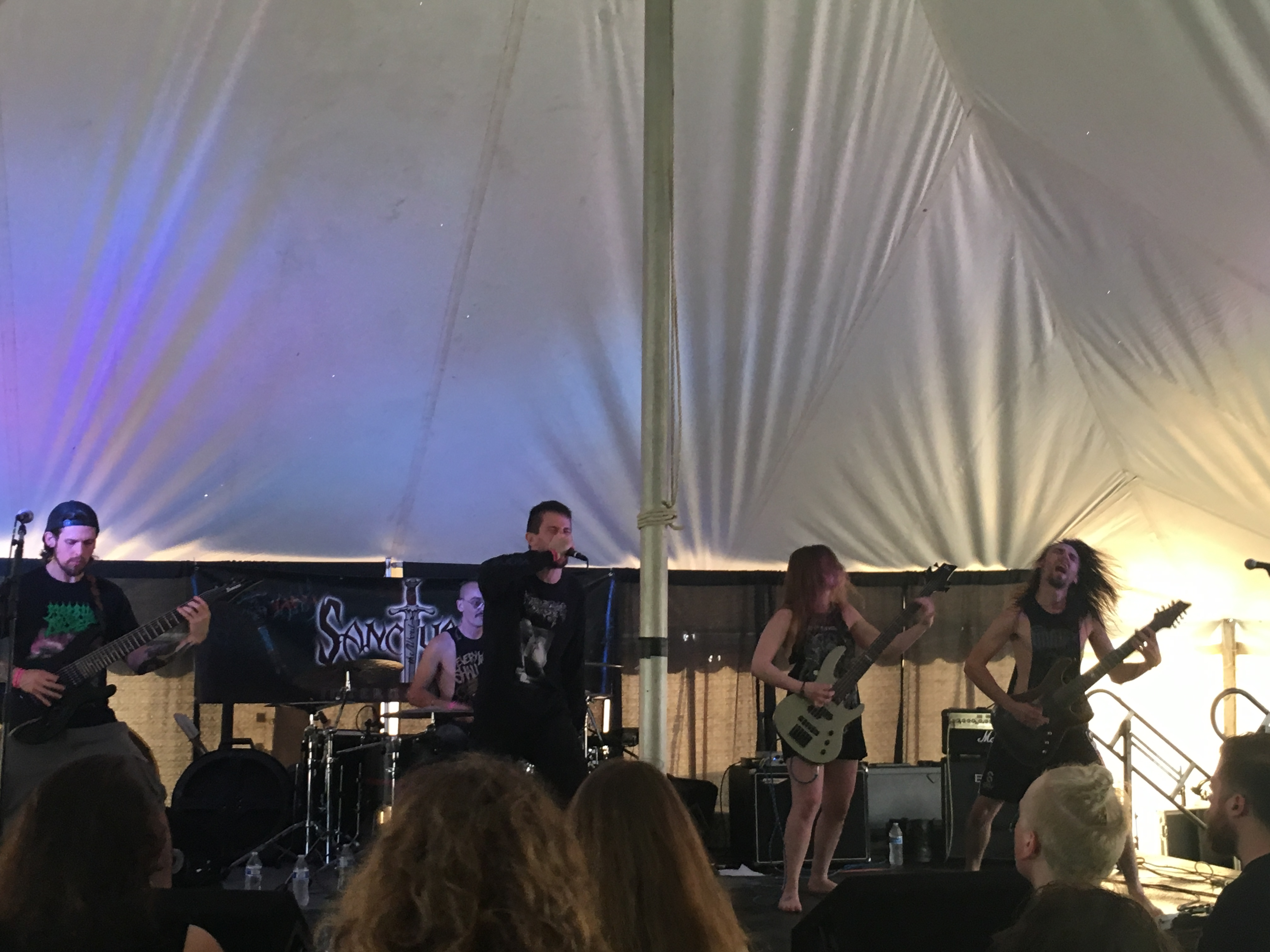
- Abated Mass of Flesh at Audiofeed Festival 2019

Background information
- Also known as: AMOF
- Origin: Murfreesboro, Tennessee, United States
- Genres: Slam death metal, brutal death metal, deathcore, Christian death metal (early)
- Years active: 2011-present
- Labels: Reality Fade, Rottweiler, Sevared Records
- Members: Zack Plunkett; Matthew Plunkett; Grant Alan; Topher Stanfield
- Past members: Logan Hayworth; Kade Dodson; Max Tubville; Thomas Wingate; Riley Wingate; James Atchison
- Website: Abated Mass of Flesh on Facebook

Abated Mass of Flesh is an American brutal death metal band formed in Murfreesboro, Tennessee, in 2011. The band consists of vocalist Matthew Plunkett, guitarist Zack Plunkett, bassist Grant Alan, and drummer Topher Stanfield. They have been compared to Dying Fetus, Impending Doom, and Crimson Thorn.

== History ==
Zack Plunkett started Abated Mass of Flesh in 2011. For the first year, he performed all instruments and vocals and released an EP titled, Moth and Rust in the Temple of Putridity on July 6, 2011. The EP was also released by Sevared Records.

In 2012, Zack added his brother Matthew to take over on vocals. They began working on the next EP. They added bassist Logan Hayworth after signing with Rottweiler Records.

In January 2013, Zack found drummer Kade Dodson, who commented on Zack's t-shirt of the brutal death metal band Dying Fetus. Dodson was interested in playing in a brutal death metal band. Zack invited him to play for the band. The project became a full-fledged band by that point. The band released their second EP, Brutal Death, and their third EP, The Anatomy of Impurity, the same year, both through Rottweiler Records. Zack recorded and mixed Brutal Death, which was mastered by Rocky Gray of Living Sacrifice, Soul Embraced, and Evanescence fame. Zack recorded and mixed The Anatomy Of Impurity, with vocal tracking and mastering handled by Jordan Casey. The band embarked on a mini tour that year, as well as their first, with Broken Flesh, performing on two dates in Arkansas and Texas. During this time, the band used Casey to record their debut studio album, The Omen King, and released an EP called Deathcrusher in February the following year. Zack recorded and mixed Deathcrusher, with Casey handling vocal mixing and mastering. After recording The Omen King, Hayworth left the band. Max Tubville took over on bass.

In 2014, the band's debut album, The Omen King, was released by Rottweiler Records. This was the last release through Rottweiler Records. Soon after, the band parted ways with Dodson. The band found drummer Riley Wingate and his brother Thomas Wingate to take over rhythm guitars. With the new lineup, they recorded their first single, "Violence," and released it on August 26, 2014. The band toured with Arkansas metalcore band Every Knee Shall Bow later that year.

In April 2015, the band traveled to Mexico City to perform at Exodo Fest with Broken Flesh. In September of that year, the band released their fifth EP, Abhorrent Postmortal Vicissity, through Sevared Records and did a mini tour with Georgia-based brutal death metal band Aborning right after.

On June 8, 2016, the band released the live album Descended Upon the Deceased. Chris Knagge recorded and engineered this release in Woodbury, Tennessee. It featured older tracks and newer songs from their then-upcoming studio album Eternal Harvest.

On April 12, 2017, the band released their sixth EP, Lacerated. Zack recorded and mixed the EP, which was released through Sevared Records. After the release, the band returned to Mexico to play Exodo Fest again. On August 25, 2017, the band released their second album, Eternal Harvest. Sam Schneider engineered the album in Murfreesboro, Tennessee. Within the same year, the band added Amber Mackenzie (half-sister of Thomas and Riley Wingate) to the lineup as a live bassist.

In 2018, the band re-recorded the EP Moth and Rust in the Temple of Putridity. This was the first year the band performed at AudioFeed in Champaign, Illinois. On October 18, 2018, it was announced that former drumme Kade Dodson died from undisclosed circumstances at the age of 33 on October 12.

In the winter of 2019, the band went on The Hasten Revelation Tour with A Hill to Die Upon, Taking the Head of Goliath, and Death Requisite.

On February 14, 2020, the band released their eighth EP, Not Burned, which Zack recorded and mixed. The band toured in March 2020 for the 2nd Hasten Revelation Tour with Taking the Head of Goliath, My Place Was Taken, Cardiac Rupture, and Crimson Thorn. On September 4, 2020 the band released their ninth EP, The Dead Will Never Forgive Us. Zack recorded and mixed this EP, which was mastered by Mychal Soto.

On August 26, 2021 the band self-released a single called "Enfleshed" and began working on their next studio album.

On April 15, 2022 the band released their third studio album, The Existence Of Human Suffering. Jordan Casey recorded and mixed the album. The band hired Joe Pelleter from PeelingFlesh, ex-Vile Impregnation, and ex-Strangled, to play drums on the album, which were recorded by Mychal Soto. A few years prior, the band released a statement on social media requesting stories from their fanbase. The stories were to include life situations or events that shaped them into who they are. The band used those stories to write the lyrics for the album.

In early 2023, the band parted ways with drummer Riley Wingate and guitarist Thomas Wingate. They added drummer James Atchison and bassist Grant Alan and started prepping for The Summer Slams Tour with Broken Flesh. Later that year, James Atchison left the band to focus on moving. The band replaced him with drummer Topher Stanfield and began writing and recording a new album for 2025.

The album, Rebirthing the Vile, was released on March 14, 2025. That same month, Zack told Heaven's Metal Magazine that the band no longer identifies as Christian, himself having renounced his faith. That summer, the band played Immersion Fest in Circleville, OH and recorded the EP Perpetual Engorgement, released on October 31.

In 2026, the band clarified their stance on being labeled a Christian band on an article from Heaven's Metal Magazine. The band stated, "We come from the Christian metal scene and still feel deeply tied to it. It was a major influence for us and we still draw inspiration from it to this day, so it feels special to be a part of this article. Though we don’t identify as a Christian band from an evangelical perspective, we do write about and explore Christian topics in our music. It remains something that continues to fascinate us and influences the writing process for our band."

== Name ==
Zack created the band's name, with the idea of "Abated" meaning to "reduce or take away" and "Mass of Flesh" signifying humanity. With that definition, the name is about diminishing the immoral acts of humanity.

== Members ==
Current

Name	Instrument	Years	Other groups
Zack Plunkett	Lead guitar, backing vocals (2011–present), drum programming (2011-2013), bass (2011-2012)	2011–present	Attest, Cadaverous Contingency, Commencement, Cryptic Rising, Flayed Alive, I Destroy I, Kentucky Derby Con Man, Numbered with the Transgressors, Phlegmlord, Propitious Vegetation
Matthew Plunkett	Lead vocals	2011–present	Cryptic Rising, Kentucky Derby Con Man, NGC 4414, Phlegmlord, Weathertalk, ex-Cadaverous Contingency, ex-Parallax Withering
James Atchison	Drums	2023–present	
Grant Alan	Bass	2023–present	

Former

Name	Instrument	Years	Other groups
Logan Hayworth	Bass	2012-2014	ex-Strengthen What Remains
Kade Dodson	Drums	2012-2014 (deceased 2018)	ex-Tony Danza Tapdance Extravaganza
Max Tubville	Bass	2013-2017	O, Majestic Winter, Nightfell Meadows, Of Saints and Pilots, Fleshdeath, ex-Essence of Immortality, ex-Parallax Withering, ex-Seventimesfallen
Riley "Spud" Wingate	Drums	2014–2023	
Thomas Wingate	Rhythm guitar (2014–present), live bass (2017)	2014–2023	
Amber Wingate McKenzie	Bass (Live)	2017–2023	

Timeline

== Discography ==
Abated Mass of Flesh discography
- Studio albums: 4
- EPs: 11
- Live albums: 2
- Compilation albums: 1
- Singles: 12

Studio albums

- The Omen King (2014)
- Lacerated (2017)
- Eternal Harvest (2017)
- The Existence of Human Suffering (2022)

EPs

- Moth and Rust in the Temple of Putridity (2011)
- Brutal Death (2013)
- The Anatomy of Impurity (2013)
- Deathcrusher (2014)
- Abhorrent Postmortal Vicissity (2015)
- Moth and Rust in the Temple of Putridity (2018)
- Not Burned (2020)
- The Dead Will Never Forgive Us (2020)
- Doomed Inception (2024)
- Rebirthing the Vile (2025)
- Perpetual Engorgement (2025)

Live

- Descended upon the Deceased (2016)
- Live and Completely Raw (2020)

Singles

- "Skin Stripped Away" (2011)
- "The Killer in Me" (2012)
- "Violence" (2014)
- "Gravecharmer" (2015)
- "Infectious Womb" (2017)
- "Shadowed By Light" (2017)
- "Drowning Beneath" (2017)
- "Undeserved" (2018)
- "Enfleshed" (2021)
- "Mortal Infraction" (2024)
- "The Killer in Me - Redux" (2024)
- "Rodent Infested" (2024)

Other songs

- "Peace in the Galaxy" - Mortification (2011)

Compilation albums

- Sands of Time (2017)

Compilation appearances

- "The Killer in Me" - Christian Deathcore Vol. 2 (2013; Christian Deathcore)
- "Violence" - Christian Deathcore Vol. 3 (2014; Christian Deathcore)
- "Posthumous Transfiguration" - God's Metal Militia Volume 1 (2014; God's Metal Militia)
- "Reflections of Suffering" - Christian Brutal Death Metal Volume 1 (2015; Christian Brutal Death Metal)
- "Violence" - United We Skate Benefit Comp - Vol. 5 Metal (2015; SkyBurnsBlack/Thumper Punk Records)
- "Gravecharmer" and "Interminable Enslavement" - Christian Deathcore Vol. 4 (2015; Christian Deathcore)
- "Violence" - The Bearded Dragon's Sampler (2.0) (2016; The Bearded Dragon Productions)
- "Shadowed by Light" - Metal From The Dragon (Vol. 1) (2017; The Bearded Dragon Productions)
- "The Longest Thorn" - Christian Deathcore Vol. 5 (2017; Christian Deathcore)
