= The Beckoning =

Canadian extreme progressive metal band

- Origin: Alberta, Canada
- Genres: progressive metal; extreme metal; Christian metal; Avant-garde metal; doom metal
- Years active: 2010–2018
- Labels: Independent, Nosral Recordings
- Members: Royden Turple; Meghann Turple; Eldon Loewen
- Website: The Beckoning on Facebook

The Beckoning is an extreme progressive metal band that originated in Canada.

== History ==
The Beckoning began in 2010 with husband and wife, Royden "Roy" and Meghann Turple. The two had been in musical projects for years together. In December 2010, the band released Bloodlet, their debut demo. The band was a part of a few compilations in their early days, including The Killing Fields, which came out through Warclub Records. During this time, the band hired on Tim Davidson (bass) and Andy Stevens (guitar) to record on Bloodlet. Soon after the release of the demo, the band released an album, Demystifying the Oracle, with Eldon Loewen as the band's first permanent guitarist and bassist. In 2012, the band released War, their debut EP. Two years later, Desolate was released. The band is currently working on their sophomore album. In 2017, the band signed to the upcoming label Nosral Recordings, the label formed by former Frost Like Ashes guitarist, Mike Larson and they will be re-releasing War and Desolate via the label. On April 20, 2018, the band announced that they disbanded, all on great terms. Later the band announced they would be releasing their final single through Nosral.

== Influences ==
The band's Facebook page states that Rush, Tourniquet, the early releases of Genesis, Pink Floyd, Extol, early In Flames, Iron Maiden, Deliverance, Saviour Machine, Virgin Black, and Believer. Although not listed on their Facebook, the band stated they could not exist without the release of Antestor's album, Return of the Black Death.

== Members ==
Last Lineup

- Royden "Roy" Turple - drums, lead vocals (2010–2018)
- Meghann Turple - keyboards, piano, female vocals (2010–2018)
- Eldon Loewen - guitars, bass (2011–2018)

Session

- Tim Davidson - bass (2010-2011)
- Andy Stevens - guitars (2010-2011)

== Discography ==
Demo

- Bloodlet (2010)

Studio album

- Demystifying the Oracle (2011)

EPs

- War (2012)
- Desolate (2014)
- The Desolation of War (2017; Nosral Recordings)

Singles

- "Symphony of the Apocalypse" (2018; Nosral Recordings)

Compilation appearances

- The Killing Fields (2011; Warclub Records)
- Metal From The Dragon Vol. 1 (2017; The Bearded Dragon Productions)
- Nosral Sampler #1 (2017; Nosral Recordings)
