= Skald in Veum =

Swedish unblack metal band

- Origin: Sweden
- Genres: Christian metal; unblack metal; black metal
- Years active: 1998–1999, 2007, 2013–present
- Labels: Rottweiler, SkyBurnsBlack
- Members: Mund Resh Zhajiin Heth
- Website: Skald in Veum on Facebook

Skald in Veum are a Swedish unblack metal band. They have released one extended play, 1260 Days (2015), with Rottweiler Records and SkyBurnBlack Records and a studio album, Stridslysten, via Rottweiler in 2019.

== Background ==
The band originated in Sweden, where they formed in 2013, with vocalist, Mund, guitarist and drummer, Resh, guitarist and bassist, Zhajiin, and their spiritual leader, Heth.

== Music history ==
The band are signed to Rottweiler Records, on 30 October 2015, they released, 1260 Days, an extended play.

== Members ==
Current members

- Mund – vocals
- Resh – guitars, drums
- Zhajiin – guitars, bass
- Heth – Spiritual leader, ideologist

== Discography ==
EPs

- 1260 Days (30 October 2015, Rottweiler/SkyBurnsBlack)

Studio albums

- Stridslysten (12 April 2019, Rottweiler)
