= Second Death (EP) =

EP by Death Requisite
- Released: August 20, 2013
- Recorded: 2013
- Genre: Symphonic death metal, black metal, blackened death metal, extreme metal, Christian metal
- Length: 21:11
- Label: Independent
- Producer: Kelly Scott Nunn

Death Requisite chronology
Prophets of Doom (2011)	Second Death (2013)	Revisitation (2016)

Second Death is the fourth EP by the extreme metal band, Death Requisite.

== Critical reception ==
Professional ratings
Review scores
Source	Rating
HM Magazine	4/5 stars
Mosh Pit Nation	3/5 stars

Chris Gatto of HM Magazine wrote "Death Requisite has been trolling around in the swamp since 1999, looking for gators to eat, I suspect. These Florida death metalers' Second Death EP is a thriller that ends all too quickly. Clocking in around only 20 minutes, it's just long enough to make listeners want more. Of the five tracks, the EP is bookended by instrumentals that add to the dark, classical vibe woven through the music. Musically, Death Requisite is very tight and would invite comparisons to Dethklok, except for the symphony motif flowing throughout the EP. Highly recommended." The Metal Missionary reports "These songs are well-composed and interesting which should lead to repeat listens. This release is a few years old, but well worth your time if you enjoy extreme metal with keys adding to the experience."

== Track listing ==
No.	Title	Length
1.	"Portenous Preludium"	1:48
2.	"Second Death"	4:38
3.	"Eternal Immortal"	6:08
4.	"Refuge of Lies"	4:53
5.	"Foreboding Horizon"	3:44
Total length:		21:11

== Personnel ==
Death Requisite

- Dave "DJ" Blackmore – lead guitar, keyboards, backing vocals
- Will Lee – drums
- Cuinn Griffen – bass
- Tyrannus – vocals

Production

- Kelly Scott Nunn – producer
