= White Collar Sideshow =

American rock band

- Also known as: WCS
- Origin: Fort Smith, Arkansas
- Genres: Industrial rock, shock rock
- Years active: 2007–present
- Labels: Curtain Call Records
- Members: TD Benton; Veronica Benton
- Past members: Phil Wells (Herr Schwein); Tristen Benton (Leech)
- Website: whitecollarsideshow.com

White Collar Sideshow is an American rock band, and they primarily play industrial rock and shock rock. They come from Fort Smith, Arkansas. The band started making music in 2007, and their lead vocalist/drummer is TD Benton and his wife, Veronica plays bass/vocals. They have released one extended play and two studio albums.

== Background ==
White Collar Sideshow is an industrial/rock/theatrical/shock rock band from Fort Smith, Arkansas, where they formed in 2006. Their current members are husband and wife duo-lead vocalist/drummer, TD Benton, and bassist/vocalist, Veronica Benton They use music and film as an excuse to hang out with people. They share their stories to help others realize they are not alone.

== Music history ==
The band commenced as a musical entity in 2007, with their first release, White Collar Sideshow, that was released on October 13, 2007, and by Come&Live! on April 21, 2009. Their subsequent release, The WitchHunt, was released on September 4, 2012, by Come&Live. Their third album titled, "I Didn't Come Here to Die," released October 4, 2019. The second and third concept albums were recorded with Chris Baseford in Los Angeles, CA. White Collar Sideshow has been touring full-time since 2008. They have traveled across 46 states and 21 countries. They have played in New Zealand, Germany, Poland and most recently Brazil and Chile.

On August 16, 2017 the band released "Tombstones For Eyes". Their third concept album titled, I Didn't Come Here to Die, released in October 2019 and the title track released July 9, 2019. The film for the album is a nod to The Twilight Zone as a black-and-white "space western."

In the spring of 2020, TD was named The Grizzly Awards "Best Drummer" of 2019. Later that year he was selected to join the 2020 GRAMMY Class as a voting member.

== Members ==
Current members

- TD Benton - drums, vocals
- Veronica Benton - bass, vocals

Past members

- Tristen Benton (Leech)- aux. percussion
- Phil Wells (Herr Schwein)- drums

== Discography ==
Studio albums

- I Didn't Come Here to Die (October 4, 2019, Curtain Call Records)
- The WitchHunt (September 4, 2012, Independent)

EPs

- White Collar Sideshow (2007, Independent)
