= Ascending King =

American extreme metal band

- Also known as: Aaron Kirby
- Origin: Midlothian, Texas
- Genres: Black metal; unblack metal; doom metal; Christian metal; atmospheric black metal
- Instruments: Vocals, guitars, bass guitar, drums, keyboards
- Years active: 2015–present
- Labels: SkyBurnsBlack, Nosral, Christian Metal Underground
- Members: Ruah
- Website: Ascending King on Facebook

Ascending King is an extreme metal band that originated in Midlothian, Texas.

== History ==
Before forming the project, Aaron Kirby was a member of a metalcore band, called Dryline, from 1999 till 2008. Around this time, Kirby grew in his Christian faith. In 2015, Kirby formed the project Ascending King and became known as Ruah. In 2016, the project joined SkyBurnsBlack Records. Following signing with the label, the band released their debut single, "Genesis of Desolation". During this time, Ruah continued to work on his EP, titled Funeral of Species. In mid-2017, the band signed to Nosral Recordings, the subsidiary of Rottweiler Records. On August 22, 2017, the band released Funeral of a Species, which received good reviews. On September 22, 2017, the band released a lyric video for "Moon for the Dead". On August 2, 2019, the project released a new single, “Lignum Vitae”, which would also feature Sebat of Frost Like Ashes. In January 2020, the band announced their signing to Christian Metal Underground Records, a subsidiary of Vision of God Records.

== Discography ==
EPs

Year	Title	Label
2017	Funeral of a Species	Nosral Recordings
2021	Funeral of a Species (Remastered & Expanded)	Vision of God Records

Singles

- "Genesis of Desolation" (2016; SkyBurnsBlack Records)
- “Lignum Vitae” (2019; Nosral Recordings)

Collaborations

- "Drink From The Chalice Of Blood (Horde cover)" - Symphony of Heaven (2018; Nosral Recordings)

Compilation appearances

- The Bearded Dragon's Sampler (2.0) (2016; The Bearded Dragon Productions)
- Metal from the Dragon (Vol. 2) (2017; The Bearded Dragon Productions)
- Nosral Sampler #1 (2017; Nosral Recordings)
