= Death Requisite =

American heavy metal band

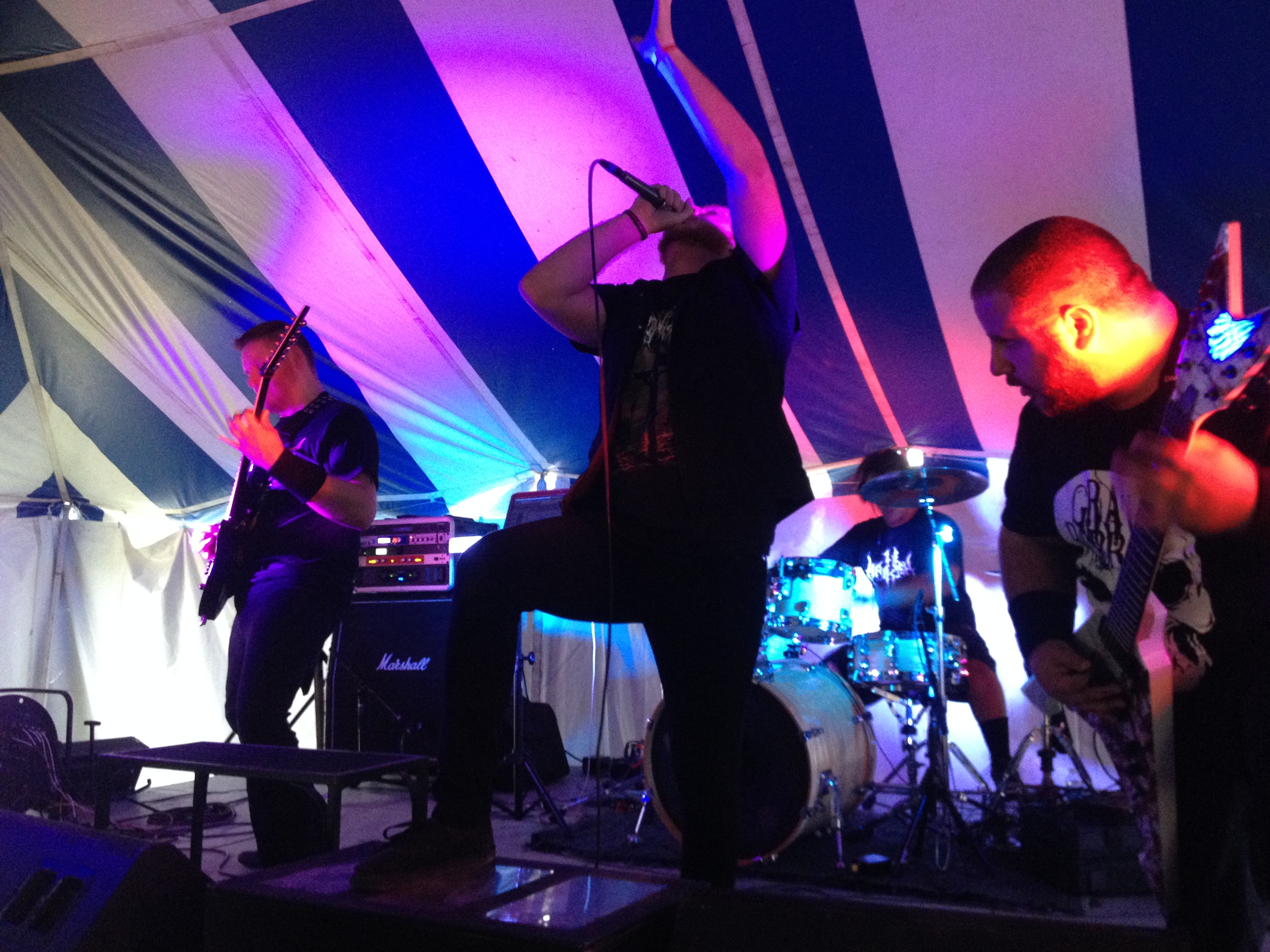
- Death Requisite at AudioFeed Festival 2016

Background information
- Also known as: DR
- Origin: Sarasota, Florida, U.S.
- Genres: Christian metal, black metal, death metal, extreme metal
- Years active: 1998–2005, 2010–present
- Labels: JDA, Sound of the Dead, (affiliated) Dysmorphic, (affiliated) Rottweiler
- Members: Dave Blackmore; Sir William Lee; Gabriel Whitmore; Johanna Fincher; Vincent St. James
- Past members: Gomez; Jon; Josh; Matthew; Thadius; Trevor; Matthias; Jamon Dane; Dennis; Cuinn Griffen; Tyrannus; Joseph Moria
- Website: Death Requisite on Facebook

Death Requisite is a heavy metal band from Sarasota, Florida, United States. The band describes their style as "blackened symphonic melodic technical death metal", or "extreme hybrid metal". The band has played with Living Sacrifice, Extol, Zao, Norma Jean, and Sleeping Giant. The band is signed to Rottweiler Records.

== Background ==
Death Requisite is a melodic death metal band from Sarasota, Florida. The band formed in 1999 and broke up in 2005. In 2010, they reformed. Since then, they have released three EPs, Prophets of Doom, Second Death, and Threnody. In June 2016, the band signed to Rottweiler Records.

The band released the album Revisitation on November 25, 2016, through Rottweiler. The album was reviewed by Kevin Tubby of Broken Flesh, Michael Cook of A Hill to Die Upon, and Kelly Shaefer of Atheist.

Bassist RTJ left the band 2016 and was unofficially replaced with Dave Blackmore's son, Gabriel. Vocalist Vincent St. James departed the band in 2017. The band revealed that they were working on new material with soprano Johanna Fincher. The band released a picture of them with former vocalist St. James, along with Blackmore and another man, revealing that the upcoming album would have five vocalists featured throughout.

On May 10, 2018, Rottweiler and the band released the artwork, the release date and title of the EP, Threnody, released on June 29, 2018.

== Name ==
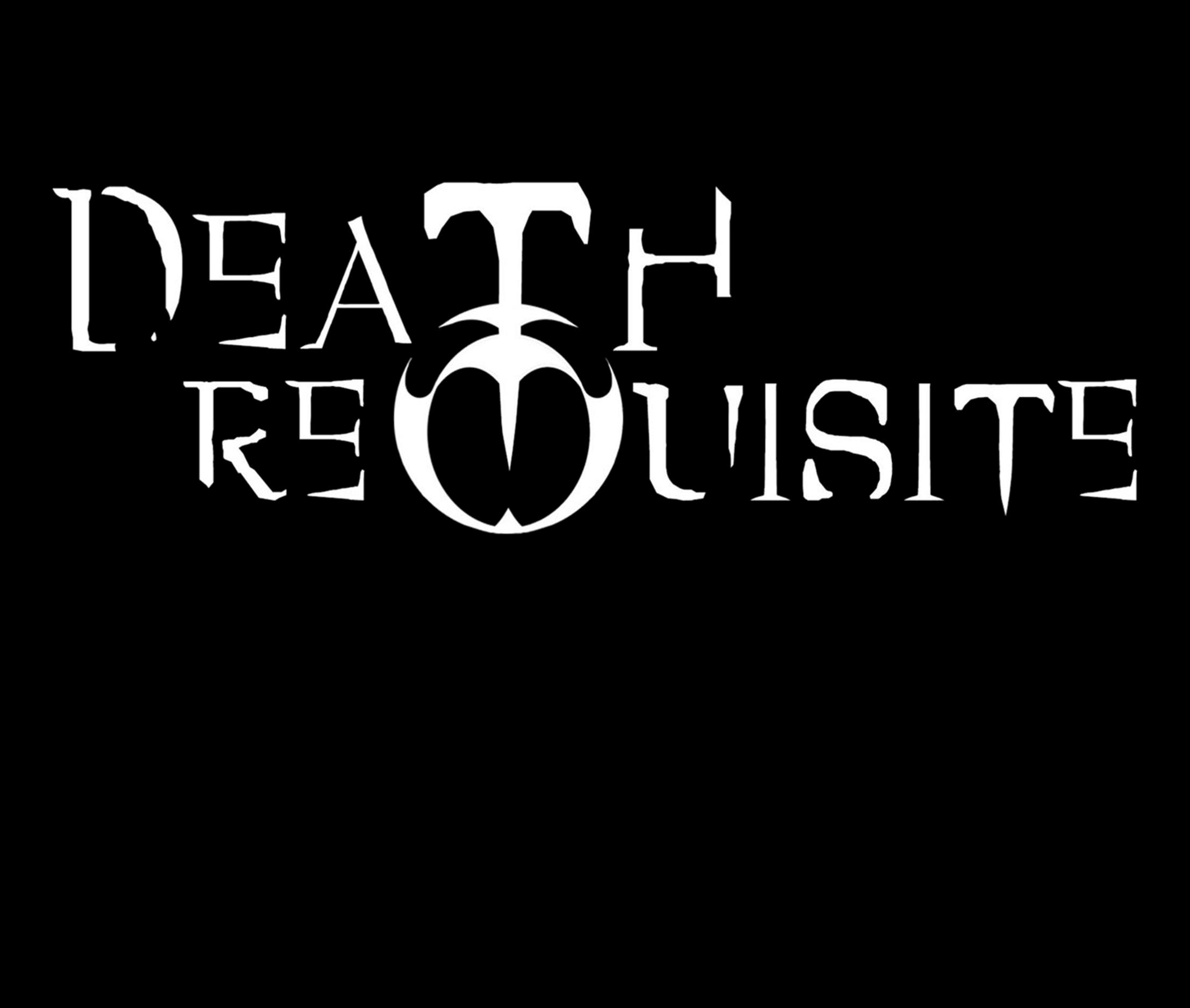
Death Requisite's logo

The band's name is derived from a quote from Stanislaw Lec:

"The first requisite for immortality is death."

== Members ==
Current

- Vincent Saint James Clerval – vocals (2012–2017, 2018–2019 [live], 2019–present)
- Johanna Fincher – soprano vocals (2017–2019 [live], 2019–present)
- Dave "Requisite" "DJ" Blackmore – lead guitar, keyboards, backing vocals (1998–2005, 2010–present)
- Gabriel Blackmore – bass (2016–2019 [live], 2019–present)
- "Sir" William Lee – drums (2001–2005, 2010–present)

Live musicians

- Jamon Dane – vocals (2001–2004)
- Logan Thompson – guitars (2018) (Symphony of Heaven)

Former

- Marcus "Matthias" – vocals (1998–2000, 2001)
- Dennis – vocals (2000)
- Tyrannus – vocals (2010–2012)
- Trevor – bass (1998–1999), rhythm guitar (1999–2001), vocals (2001–2002)
- Matthew – rhythm guitar (2000–2001)
- Eric – rhythm guitar (2003)
- Thadius – rhythm guitar (2002–2005)
- Joseph "ov" Moria – rhythm guitar (2013–2017)
- Gomez – bass (2002–2005)
- Jon – bass (1999–2002)
- Cuinn Griffen – bass (2010–2014)
- Justin "Regnal the Just" – bass (2014–2016)
- Josh – drums (1999–2001)

Timeline

== Discography ==
EPs

- Living Sanctuary (2000, independent)
- Thanatopsis (2004, JDA)
- Prophets of Doom (2011, independent)
- Second Death (2013, independent)
- Threnody (June 29, 2018, Rottweiler)

Studio albums

- From Death to Life (2001, JDA)
- Revisitation (November 25, 2016, Rottweiler)

Demo

- Unreleased demo (1999)

Singles

- "Revisitation" (2015)
- "Redemptio Per Deicide" (2016)
- "Tormentor" (2018)

Compilation appearances

- A Brutal Christmas: The Season in Chaos (2002; Sounds of the Dead Records)
- The Bearded Dragon's Sampler (2.0) (2016; the Bearded Dragon Productions)
- The Pack Vol. 1 (2016; Rottweiler)
- Metal From The Dragon (Vol. 2) (2017; the Bearded Dragon Productions)
- The Pack Vol. 2 (2018; Rottweiler)
