= As They Sleep =

American extreme metal band

- Also known as: ATS
- Origin: Detroit, Michigan, U.S.
- Genres: Melodic death metal, deathcore
- Years active: 2003–present
- Labels: Solid State, Luxor
- Members: Aaron Bridgewater; Barry Gomez; Nick Morris; Derek Kosiba; Tony Lukitsh
- Past members: Paul Burkett
- Website: astheysleep.com

As They Sleep is an American extreme metal band from Detroit, Michigan. They have released two albums and an EP.

Shortly after releasing their first album, As They Sleep signed to metal label Solid State Records. They released their second album, Dynasty, on November 23, 2010. Mixed by Jason Suecof (Job for a Cowboy, August Burns Red, Whitechapel) at Audio Hammer Studios, the album has one music video. Since then, they have toured with bands such as Becoming the Archetype, Living Sacrifice, The Showdown and To Speak of Wolves.

Since the release of the album, Dynasty has received very positive feedback.

== History ==
According to vocalist Aaron Bridgewater, the band formed in 2003 as a three piece and the other two members joined later. They released an independently released self-titled EP in 2005. The band signed to Luxor Records soon after the release.

Their debut album, Blacken the Sun, was released on October 28, 2008, under Luxor Records. Produced by the band's own guitarist, Nick Morris, owner of Cloud City Studios (The Black Dahlia Murder, Walls of Jericho). Blacken The Sun was moderately successful and defined the band's unique death metal style. After Blacken the Sun, the band signed to Solid State Records. Their highly acclaimed second album, Dynasty was released in 2010, before leaving Solid State, and re-signing to Luxor.

== Name ==
The band's name is a metaphor, as Bridgewater said in an interview with CCM Magazine. Here is the full quote:

"As They Sleep is a metaphor for going above and beyond to succeed, kind of like in warfare. When the enemy sneaks into camp in the middle of the night to take you out as you sleep, [you've got to do] whatever it takes to prevail."

The band has been wondered to be a Christian, most likely due to being signed on Solid State Records, a record label with both secular and Christian bands. The band leaves it up to their listeners to determine this.

== Band members ==
Current members

- Aaron Bridgewater – vocals (2003–present)
- Derek Kosiba – bass (2003–present)
- Barry Gomez – guitar (2003–present)
- Nick Morris – guitar (2003–present)
- Tony Lukitsh – drums (2009–present)

Former members

- Paul Burkett – drums (2003-2009)

Session musicians

- Steve Longworth – piano (2008)

Timeline

== Discography ==
Studio albums

- Blacken the Sun (2008)
- Dynasty (2010)
- The Hallowed Abstract (TBD)

EPs

- As They Sleep (2005)

Music Videos

- "A Thousand Deaths" (2009)
- "Oracle of the Dead" (2011)
