= List of Christian death metal bands =

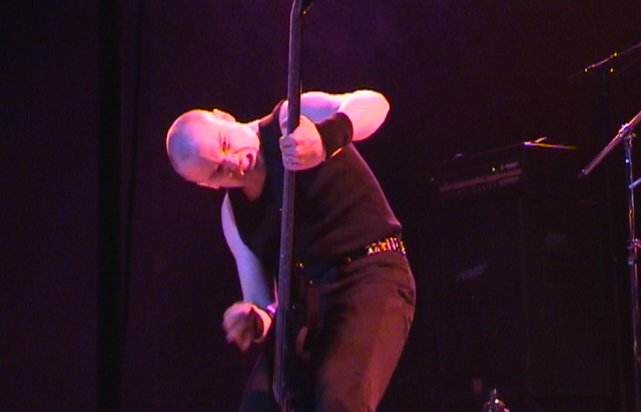
Aki Särkioja of Immortal Souls, a leading Finnish Christian death metal band

The following is a list of Christian death metal bands. Christian death metal consists of death metal music fused with Christian metal; that is, death metal music with Christian lyrical content, or from bands whose members profess Christianity, or both. Because of the gory, violent, and often vehemently anti-Christian or Satanic lyrics typical of the death metal genre, Christian death metal is often considered an oxymoron and odd juxtaposition by commentators and has also encountered resistance from some Christians. Christian death metal emerged in the late-1980s through the mid-1990s through the outputs of Mortification, Vomitorial Corpulence, and Paramaecium in Australia, Opprobrium, Living Sacrifice, and Crimson Thorn in the United States, Sympathy in Canada, and the early work of Antestor in Norway. In the same period, the Christian thrash metal bands Vengeance Rising, Sacrament, and Believer, all from the United States, also included elements of death metal. In the late 1990s and early 2000s, Norway's Extol, Finland's Immortal Souls and Deuteronomium, Sweden's Pantokrator, Germany's Sacrificium, Ukraine's Holy Blood, the United States' Embodyment, Feast Eternal, Possession, Aletheian, Becoming the Archetype, and Tortured Conscience, and Brazil's Antidemon all further developed the genre.

During the 2000s, the metalcore bands Underoath, As I Lay Dying, Norma Jean, and Demon Hunter emerged and quickly rose to become some of the leading bands in the general hard rock market. All four for at least part of their careers have been described in music press as performing death metal. In the latter half of the 2000s, Impending Doom (from the United States) and Blood Covenant (from India) joined the forefront of Christian death metal.

== 0-9 ==
- 7 Horns 7 Eyes

== A ==
- Abated Mass of Flesh
- Aletheian
- Altera Enigma
- Antestor
- Antidemon
- As Hell Retreats
- As I Lay Dying
- As They Sleep
- At the Throne of Judgment

== B ==
- Becoming the Archetype
- Behold the Kingdom
- Believer
- Betraying the Martyrs
- Blood Covenant
- Broken Flesh
- The Burial

== C ==
- Children of Wrath
- Corpus Christi
- Creations
- Crimson Moonlight
- Crimson Thorn
- Cruentis

== D ==
- Death Requisite
- Demon Hunter
- Deus Invictus
- Deuteronomium
- Drottnar

== E ==
- Embodiment
- Embodyment
- Extol

== F ==
- The Famine
- Feast Eternal
- Flactorophia
- Fleshkiller
- Foreknown
- From the Shallows
- Frost Like Ashes

== G ==
- Glass Casket
- Gnashing of Teeth
- Grave Declaration
- Grave Forsaken

== H ==
- The Handshake Murders
- Haste the Day
- A Hill to Die Upon
- Holy Blood
- Hope for the Dying
- Hortor

== I ==
- Immortal Souls
- Impending Doom
- Indwelling
- Inevitable End
- In the Midst of Lions

== K ==
- Kekal

== L ==
- Lament
- Letter to the Exiles
- Light Unseen
- Living Sacrifice

== M ==
- Metanoia
- Messengers
- Miseration
- Misery Chastain
- Monotheist
- Mortal Treason
- Mortification
- MyChildren MyBride

== N ==
- Nodes of Ranvier
- Norma Jean

== O ==
- Onward to Olympas
- Opprobrium
- Outrage A.D.

== P ==
- Pantokrator
- Paramaecium
- A Plea for Purging
- Phinehas

== R ==
- Revulsed

== S ==
- Sacrament
- Sacrificium
- Sanctifica
- Schaliach
- Scourged Flesh
- Separatist
- The Showdown
- Solamors
- Soul Embraced
- Sympathy

== T ==
- Taking the Head of Goliath
- Temple of Perdition
- A Thousand Times Repent
- Tortured Conscience

== U ==
- Underoath
- Underneath the Gun

== V ==
- Vardøger
- Vengeance Rising
- Virgin Black
- Voluntary Mortification
- Vomitorial Corpulence

== W ==
- With Blood Comes Cleansing
- Woe of Tyrants

== Y ==
- Your Chance to Die

== Z ==
- Zao
