= Christian death metal =

Music genre

- Other names: Life metal
- Stylistic origins: Christian metal, death metal
- Cultural origins: Late-1980s – mid-1990s, Australia, North America, and Norway
- Typical instruments: Electric guitar, bass guitar, drums, vocals

Other topics
- List of Christian death metal bands • Unblack metal

Christian death metal or life metal is a subgenre that blends death metal music with Christian metal. It is defined by death metal’s musical style combined with Christian-themed lyrics, performed by bands whose members identify as Christians. Musically, it remains indistinguishable from traditional death metal, characterized by heavy guitar riffs, blast beats, and guttural vocals. However, the lyrics set it apart, often focusing on Christian concepts such as demons, sin, self and self-denial, divine judgment, and apocalypse. The imagery in Christian death metal frequently mirrors or contrasts with that found in secular death metal, which often deals with violent, gory, or anti-Christian themes. Because of this, some critics view Christian death metal as an oxymoron or a surprising juxtaposition, and it has faced resistance from both secular death metal fans and some within the Christian community.

Christian death metal proper formed in the late-1980s to the mid-1990s through the outputs of Mortification, Vomitorial Corpulence, and Paramaecium in Australia, Opprobrium, Living Sacrifice, and Crimson Thorn in the United States, Sympathy in Canada, and the early work of Antestor in Norway. In the same period, the Christian thrash metal bands Vengeance Rising, Sacrament, and Believer, all from the United States, also included elements of death metal. In the late 1990s and early 2000s, Norway's Extol, Finland's Immortal Souls and Deuteronomium, Sweden's Pantokrator, Germany's Sacrificium, Ukraine's Holy Blood, the United States' Embodyment, Feast Eternal, Possession, Aletheian, Becoming the Archetype, and Tortured Conscience, and Brazil's Antidemon emerged to further develop the genre. In the 2000s, the metalcore bands Underoath, As I Lay Dying, Norma Jean, and Demon Hunter all received labels of Christian death metal, and were some of the leading bands in the general hard rock market. In the latter half of the 2000s, Impending Doom (from the United States) and Blood Covenant (from India) have joined the forefront of Christian death metal.

== Background ==
=== Death metal ===
==== Characteristics ====
Death metal is an extreme subgenre of heavy metal music that features fast, distorted, down-tuned, and sometimes palm-muted guitar instrumentation, growled and screamed vocals, and hyper-fast, blast beat drumming. Death metal lyrics typically feature graphic, sometimes pornographic and misogynistic, themes of violence, gore, disease, and death; Satanic, blasphemous, and anti-Christian content; or, to a lesser extent, war, apocalypse, social and philosophical concerns, and esotericism and spiritualism. The growled vocal style has been identified for contributing to death metal's relative lack of popularity as a music style.

==== History ====
Death metal emerged as a genre during the mid 1980s, primarily out of thrash metal. In the early to mid 1980s, the European bands Venom, Bathory, Celtic Frost (and its predecessor Hellhammer), Sodom, Destruction, and Kreator performed a more intense style of heavy metal music that set sonic and lyrical templates for the thrash, black, and death metal genres. The American band Slayer also influenced the rise of death metal, featuring graphic lyrics dealing with death, dismemberment, war, and the horrors of hell. However, the California band Possessed, which formed in 1983, is considered to have released first true death metal recording, Seven Churches, in 1985. Contemporary with Possessed, the band Death was formed in 1983 in Florida by Chuck Schuldiner, Kam Lee, and Rick Rozz. Inspired by the Floridian act Nasty Savage, they took the sound of Nasty Savage and deepened it. It was called "the first true death metal record" by the San Francisco Chronicle. Schuldiner is widely recognized as the "Father of Death Metal". Along with Possessed and Death, other pioneers of death metal include Obituary, Malevolent Creation, Monstrosity, Cannibal Corpse, Deicide, and Post Mortem.

=== Christian metal ===
==== Characteristics ====
Christian metal is not a solitary style of music, but rather an ideological umbrella term that comprises every subgenre of heavy metal music, from hard rock to black metal. A unique factor is that Christian metal bands typically base their lyrics on Judeo-Christian traditions. AllMusic writes that Christian metal is "gospel music's hard rock". While not as hard as most heavy metal, "it still has many of its trademarks, particularly loud guitars, bombastic riffs, long solos, and pseudo-operatic vocals." According to the website, most bands fall somewhere between arena rock and pop metal, with the exception of some heavier bands. Author Michael Heatley notes, however, that Christian metal exists within most of the subgenres of metal. Jussi Lahtonen of the Finnish punk and metal zine Sue similarly states that Christian metal encompasses every metal subgenre.

The lyrics can be explicitly Christian theological topics, or else approaching other social or cultural issues from a Christian perspective. Some emphasize the positive aspects of faith matters while others iterate the teachings of Christ. Some bands keep their message hidden in metaphors. A minority take an aggressive attitude towards those who speak against Christianity, preaching "fire and brimstone" and "Old Testament Wrath of God" back at extreme Satanists. References to eschatology and apocalyptic themes, particularly the ongoing spiritual warfare between good and evil, as well as the Last Judgment and fall from grace are typical. For many Christian metal artists, evangelism and proselytizing are major goals, alongside creating a space for alternative expressions of the Christian faith.

==== History ====
Christian metal has its origins in the late 1960s and early 1970s in the Jesus movement, a hippie movement with Christian ideology consisting of hippies who converted to Christianity. The Christian hippies within this movement, known as "Jesus People", developed a musical movement called Jesus music. It primarily began in southern California when hippie street musicians converted to Christianity. These musicians continued playing the same styles of music they had played before converting, among them heavy metal music, though they infused their lyrics with a Christian message. The first Christian hard rock group was possibly the California-based band Agape, formed in the late 1960s. Known for their psychedelic rock and blues influences, the band released two albums in the early 1970s. In the 1970s, Resurrection Band and Barnabas, from the United States, Daniel Band, from Canada, and the Swedish group Jerusalem emerged as Christian metal hard rock groups. Kris Klingensmith of Barnabas explained that "since Christian musicians have always copied the trends and styles initiated by their secular counterparts, 'Christian metal' was unavoidable. If you want to know what Christian music will be doing tomorrow, all you need to do is see what the secular guys are doing today." In 2002, Barry Alfonso attributed the emergence of a Christian music industry that stylistically parallels mainstream secular music – including styles such as lounge, hardcore punk, and death metal – to a combination of how Christian fundamentalism interacts with society and an envy of mass media's ability to reach large audiences. He also attributed it to Christian creatives appreciating mainstream music, TV, and pop music, but desiring more substantial Christian content in those mediums.

In the 1980s, Christian metal bands closely followed the trends of mainstream heavy metal bands. The American band Stryper, formed in 1983, was the first band to identify as Christian metal and gained attention for throwing Bibles to the audience at their concerts. In the beginning, it was mostly Christians who went to Stryper's concerts. Soon, they attracted a mainstream, non-Christian audience. Their third studio album, To Hell with the Devil, was a landmark of the mainstream glam metal movement. It reached No. 32 on the Billboard 200 and was certified Platinum by the RIAA for reaching 1 million copies, eventually breaking into the 2 million mark. The band's music videos were on regular rotation on MTV throughout the decade. Stryper was popular on tour, reaching millions of fans in the secular market. By 1987, there were more than a hundred Christian metal bands, and their records were sold at both Christian bookstores and non-Christian retails. In the late 1980s and early 1990s, Christian metal reached its peak in popularity. In a 2016 retrospective, Classic Rock wrote that "For almost every sub-genre of heavy music there's an inferior Christian version playing the church circuit... ...That's Stryper's fault, basically."

In the early 1990s, the rising musical styles, especially grunge, began to take their places as major styles in the mainstream. This resulted in much of heavy metal, particularly glam metal, losing popularity and going underground for a decade. Many Christian metal musicians began to play extreme metal, and soon death metal replaced thrash metal in popularity. Audiences in many underground metal scenes began favoring more extreme sounds while disparaging the popular styles. As with other glam metal acts of the time, Stryper lost popularity and split up in 1993.

== Characteristics ==
=== Peculiarity ===
Given the typical subject matter and musical style of death metal, Christian death metal has been considered an incongruous combination, being labeled a "bizarre beast", an oxymoron, a contradiction in terms, and the least likely musical development at the close of the 20th century. Author Larry Eskridge remarked that the existence of "a Christian version of so-called death metal" is in-and-of-itself surprising. Alexander Kiryushkin of Ultimate Guitar similarly stated regarding the goregrind act Vomitorial Corpulence: "Christian. Gore-grind. It is not supposed to go together and yet it does." Sabatino DiBernardo writes that when "Christian death metal" became just another subgenre of metal, two seemingly contrary spheres ironically co-mingle: a previously "demonic" noise becomes "transubstantiated miraculously into salvific Christian music." In the early 1990s as Mortification were releasing death metal albums, some Christians felt that death metal was not appropriate for Christians. In response, some fans of the scene started calling the music "life metal". Crimson Thorn also disliked it being labeled death metal or grindcore, preferring instead the label of "gruntcore". Likewise, Sacrificium have labeled their music "White Death Metal" to highlight the Christian lyrical content.

Conversely, the bands themselves and their fans do not see any contradiction between the chaotic subject matter and Christianity. As an online fan expressed, "there are a lot of dark elements in the Bible, and in the world." Seth Metoyer, the owner of the independent record label Broken Curfew Records, as well as a film composer and a member of the bands Mangled Carpenter, Pulpit Vomit, and Brain Matter, argues that brutal death metal music and the accompanying violent or gory imagery can evangelistically reach people who would never enter a church. He contends that this is part of the "becoming all things to all people" described in 1 Corinthians 9:22, also that, per Romans 14:3, Christians should not be passing judgement on each other. Some Christian metalheads even use the humorous term "Gorship" – coined by the band Impending Doom – to refer to the melding of death metal and grindcore with Christian lyrics. Scholar Tom Cardwell notes that heavy metal imagery, even when antagonistic to Christianity, draws heavily from Christian imagery and iconography.

The Christian metal musician Pekka stated that "in my opinion, you cannot just splash the kinds of 'Jesus loves you, period' style of thing to death metal...One is allowed to do that but it is sort of to break with the style a bit." Conversely, Christian rock apologist Eric Sellin argues that "the fact that the lyrics are to the casual or first time listener rather indecipherable, that's just the nature of the scene. No one would say that a hymn that's in Latin is wrong because they don't speak the language. The shouting of thrash vocals, and death vocals, the growling is inherent in the metal scene." Kristiaan Hasselhuhn of the Swedish secular death metal band Inverted stated in a 1993 interview that "I don't like those Christian death metal bands singing about God and that you shall devote your life to him. They are not in the scene for the music" but that "there are Christian death metal bands that are quite okay as long as they're not telling you what to do." Likewise, Rick Peart of Voices from the Darkside in their review of From the Dead (2018) by the Christian death metal band Corpse concedes that "when we listen to an album, a significant part of what really matters is the value of music, regardless of the lyrical themes or the concept. As long as Christian Metal isn't a form of proselytism and evangelization, it's not a problem for me", but maintained that "there's no doubt that morbid and satanic themes are better."

=== Common topical themes ===
"Necromanicide" by Mortification, from Scrolls of the Megilloth (1992), inverts Satanism into a warning against the profane: "Communication with the dead / Contact with those in the grave ... This foul practice must be stopped / Before your cadaver starts to rot / Fall prostrate before the cross / Bathe in the blood of the sacrifice".

In "Hammering Satan's Head", originally released in 1995 as part of Karrionic Hacktician, Vomitorial Corpulence describe Jesus Christ inflicting gory violence on Satan.

As with Christian metal more generally, Christian death metal often invokes violent imagery against Satan, demons, and sin, or otherwise emphasizes violence, death, and gore. Author Christopher Partridge holds that because the agenda is set by the music, not theology, it is difficult for Christian extreme musicians to move far beyond topics of violence, death, and apocalypse. These themes of death, chaos, and doom are also reflected in the choices of band names, such as Corpse, Mortification, Crimson Thorn, and Impending Doom. Much of this violence and gore is drawn from the Bible. For instance, the band name "Vomitorial Corpulence" refers to Revelation 3:15–16. Steve Rowe on Mortification's self-titled album (1991) delivered fire and brimstone sermons railing against sin "like a feverish Old Testament prophet" on songs like "The Destroyer Beholds" and "Satan's Doom". The latter song, a reference to Genesis 3:15, exclaims that Satan's "head will be crushed and vile gore spurt." "J.G.S.H." from Blood World (1994) likewise repeats the line "Jesus grinds Satan's head". Similarly, "Hammering Satan's Head", by Vomitorial Corpulence from Karrionic Hacktician (1995), details the gory violence that Jesus Christ will inflict on Satan. Opprobrium on "The Battle of Armageddon" from Serpent Temptation (1988) create a story regarding Armageddon in the Bible. Crimson Thorn on "Comatose" imply that those without Christ are not truly alive (per 1 John 5:12). On "Unearthed" (the title track to the 1994 album), they refer to Christians being dead to self and alive in Christ.

The judgement of sin and sinners also is a topic of Christian death metal. Crimson Thorn on "Imminent Wrath" describe the divine wrath awaiting those who reject or ignore Christ. Mortification on "Eternal Lamentation" sonically portrays the ungodly screaming in pain in Hell, and "Before He Spits Back" by Tortured Conscience warns that "You can only spit in God's face for so long. Before He spits back."

Again like Christian metal broadly, Christian death metal lyrics also sometimes convey the Christian belief that believers are at spiritual war against, and must actively resist, Satan and demons, the world system, and their own human nature, as exemplified in songs such Vengeance Rising's "Warfare", Mortification's "New Beginnings", "Blood Sacrifice", and "Brutal Warfare", and Crimson Thorn's "Your Carcass". However, violence against fellow humans is not deemed acceptable or advocated for in any way. Indeed, "Seen it All" by Mortification condemns the violence of the world. Some bands, such as Tortured Conscience, Sordid Death, Crimson Thorn, Grim, and Lament, will lyrically engage in a form of self-flagellation. The Christian metal website The Whipping Post exemplifies this type of self-flagellation with its motto "Brutal whipping for our sin...brutal music for our savior." Similarly, the name of the deathcore band Voluntary Mortification refers to self-denial and willful embrace of suffering and humility. Mortification's song "Necromanicide" inverts the Satanism common to death metal by transforming a Satanic ritual into a warning against the profane: "Communication with the dead / Contact with those in the grave ... This foul practice must be stopped / Before your cadaver starts to rot / Fall prostrate before the cross / Bathe in the blood of the sacrifice".

Social topics are sometimes touched on by Christian death metal artists. For instance, the Mortification song "Toxic Shock" decries drug abuse, "Grind Planetarium" mocks a rock star's desire to be worshipped, and Tortured Conscience's "Moloch Reborn" rejects abortion. Lyrics sometimes are turned toward perceived political and religious opponents, as in the case of "Malignant Masters" by Crimson Thorn, which excoriates liberal academics. "An Open Letter" by Tortured Conscience rebuts Jehovah's Witnesses, and Opprobrium denounce corrupt political and religious leaders on "Blaspheming Prophets".

Some bands in Christian death metal eschew the above common themes of salvation and judgment to explore more esoteric and devotional topics. For instance, Sweden's Pantokrator delve into obscure and mythical topics and figures from Christianity, such as the Nephilim, Lilith, Melchizedek, and Song of Songs. The band's 2001 release Song of Solomon thematically counters secular metal lyrics through its expressions of hope, love, purity, and authenticity. The song "Come Let Us Flee" expresses color and hope emerging out of the bleakness of horror, destitution, and destruction. An example of this is the lines "the winter is over and gone and the rains has [sic] passed away / the gentle flowers appear in the blackened earth."

=== Common imagery ===
Though common in secular metal, skull imagery in Christian metal is rare and mostly found in metalcore and extreme metal, such as Christian death metal. For example, Corpse and Mortification use skulls in their band logos. Eric Strother in his dissertation hypothesizes that such imagery might be uncommon because it is perceived by some Christians as glorifying death and evil. He quotes as an example a forum comment reacting to the cover art of Antestor's The Return of the Black Death (1998): "I personally don't have peace about it though. I see it as people taking pleasure in scenes depicting evil and death." Christian death metal sometimes inverts or subverts the Satanic or anti-Christian thematic imagery of death metal. Within Christian extreme metal in general, the play of opposites and inversions is common on forums, albums, and other aesthetic materials. Voluntary Mortification uses the Cross of Saint Peter in their logo, a subversion of the common metal trope of inverted crosses used for shock value. Similarly, the band reappropriated the disparaging term "death cult" in reference to Christianity for a tour tagline of "we are the death cult". In response to use of the pentagram by secular and Satanic metal bands, some Christian bands have created their own alternative imagery, such as Mortification's use of the Star of David on Hammer of God (1999), Deborah's use of the heptagram on Soteria (2007), or Impending Doom's "repentagram" (an originally composed, nine-pointed symbol). Cosmo Lee from Stylus Magazine noted once seeing a t-shirt rendering the Megadeth logo as "Megalife". Christian extreme metal bands also frequently use the established extreme metal convention of band name logos rendered in elaborate, nearly indecipherable type, as evidenced in the logos of Old Man Frost, Crimson Moonlight, Pantokrator, Living Sacrifice, Detritus, and Crimson Thorn.

== History ==
=== Early antecedents (late 1980s) ===
Christian death metal bands developed in the late 1980s. As the secular hardcore punk scene became heavier, faster, and more aggressive, and fused with heavy metal to create genres such as speed metal and thrash metal, the Christian metal scene likewise grew heavier, aggressive, and extreme. Incubus (later known as Opprobrium), formed in 1986 in Louisiana, United States by two brothers recently immigrated from Brazil. They were a Christian band, and in the late 1980s started to experiment with a death metal sound. They released their debut album, The Serpent Temptation, in 1988. In 1987, the American band Vengeance (later known as Vengeance Rising) was formed as a Christian alternative to the death metal scene. Their 1988 debut, Human Sacrifice, features a heavy thrash metal very close to, and at times veering into, death metal. The record opened the way for the proliferation of Christian extreme metal, and, according to HM, the impact of it and the 1990 follow-up, Once Dead, on Christian extreme metal "cannot be overstated". According to Doug Van Pelt of HM, "Nothing has really come out before or since this album hit the scene", and the songs "White Throne" and "Human Sacrifice" are high water marks of Christian metal. In 1994, The Morning Call listed Vengeance Rising alongside Mortification and Living Sacrifice as examples of Christian death metal. The Pennsylvania band Sacrament also featured a heavy thrash sound similar to death metal. Eddie Lloyd of Indie Vision Music writes that they were either the first Christian death metal band or that genre's heaviest thrash metal band. Their 1989 debut, Testimonies of the Apocalypse, featured a sound similar to the "old school" death metal of Death, Obituary, and early Entombed. The progressive thrash metal band Believer, founded in 1986, also mixed death metal and symphonic metal into their sound for their three releases in 1989, 1990, and 1993. The December 14, 1990, issue of CMJ New Music Report called Believer the first Christian death metal band "as far as we can tell". Kurt Bachman of Believer acknowledged in 2009 that "We even get called death metal some times even though I don’t think we resemble anything death metal-ish out there, but then again I have my own opinions on what death metal is."

=== Emergence (late 1980s through mid-1990s) ===
==== Australia ====
Subsequent the work of Opprobrium, the groups Mortification and Vomitorial Corpulence, both from Melbourne, Australia, were the main progenitors of the Christian death metal. Mortification was formed in 1990 out of Steve Rowe's previous band Lightforce, after Rowe decided to move in a heavier direction influenced by Morbid Angel and Napalm Death. Initially, the band's sound was thrash and early death metal. Under the name Lightforce, they recorded a demo, Break the Curse. The band changed their name, released the demo in 1990, then debuted with a self-titled album in 1991. The self-titled debut sonically featured a grindcore sound. By 1992, Mortification had moved to a deathgrind sound for that year's release, Scrolls of the Megilloth. This release proved influential in the development of Christian death metal. Kirk Dombek of AllMusic considers the vocals on that recording the "most frightening" ever recorded, and notes that the band is considered by many to be the most extreme Christian band in existence. Barry Alfonso in The Billboard Guide to Contemporary Christian Music describes the recording as plunging the listener into a "nightmarish landscape of tortured humanity". The band began to shift from grindcore toward power metal for their fourth album, Post Momentary Affliction. With that album and the live video album Live Planetarium, both released in 1993, Mortification became not only the most successful and popular Christian death metal group, but achieved success in the general market, becoming one of the best-selling heavy metal bands from Australia. Following the 1993 releases, the band again sonically evolved, incorporating groove metal, thrash, power metal, grindcore, and punk into their death metal sound.

The goregrind band Vomitorial Corpulence formed in 1992. The band debuted in 1995 with their album, Karrionic Hacktician, which was released via the compilation album, The Extreme Truth, through Steve Rowe's Rowe Productions label. Skin Stripper, a 27-song collection of grindcore similar to early-period Carcass, was released in 1998. Paul Green, the founder of the band, then moved to the United States in 2001 and reformed the band. Skin Stripper was re-released through Morbid Records and Vomitorial Corpulence began recording new material. Green relocating once again to Australia effectively ended the band's tenure.

In 1991, also in Melbourne, the death-doom band Paramaecium was founded. Its demo, Silent Carnage, was in a death metal style. In 1993, Jayson Sherlock left Mortification to join the band. The band released its debut, Exhumed of the Earth, that same year. Jonathan Swank of HM called the release "the most powerful and moving death/doom recording in the history of Christian metal."

==== North America ====
Roughly contemporary with Mortification and Vomitorial Corpulence, the bands Living Sacrifice and Crimson Thorn, from the United States, and Sympathy, from Canada emerged. Living Sacrifice formed in 1989 in Little Rock, Arkansas, and was noted for its death metal sound and evangelical Christian lyrics. Heavily influenced by the Florida death metal scene, the band released three recordings in this vein — Living Sacrifice (1991), Nonexistent (1992), and Inhabit (1994). The debut release featured more of a thrash sound, whereas the latter two were more death metal. The band then evolved to a different, more punk-influenced style in the late 1990s. As Living Sacrifice shifted direction in its musical style, two of the members, Lance Garvin and Rocky Gray, formed Soul Embraced in 1997, as a side-project to continue making death metal music. The song "My Tourniquet" written for that project was later re-recorded as "Tourniquet" by Evanescence, which Rocky Gray was also a member of, for that band's 2003 album Fallen. Crimson Thorn, formed in Minneapolis, is described by Eduardo Rivadavia of AllMusic as "surely one of the world's most extreme-sounding Christian metal bands." The band's second release, Dissection, released in 1997, was described by Rad Rockers as "the supreme perfection of Christian death metal." Sympathy began as a five-piece ensemble in 1991, but by 1995, was reduced to a solo project for the recording and release of Age of Darkness.

==== Norway ====
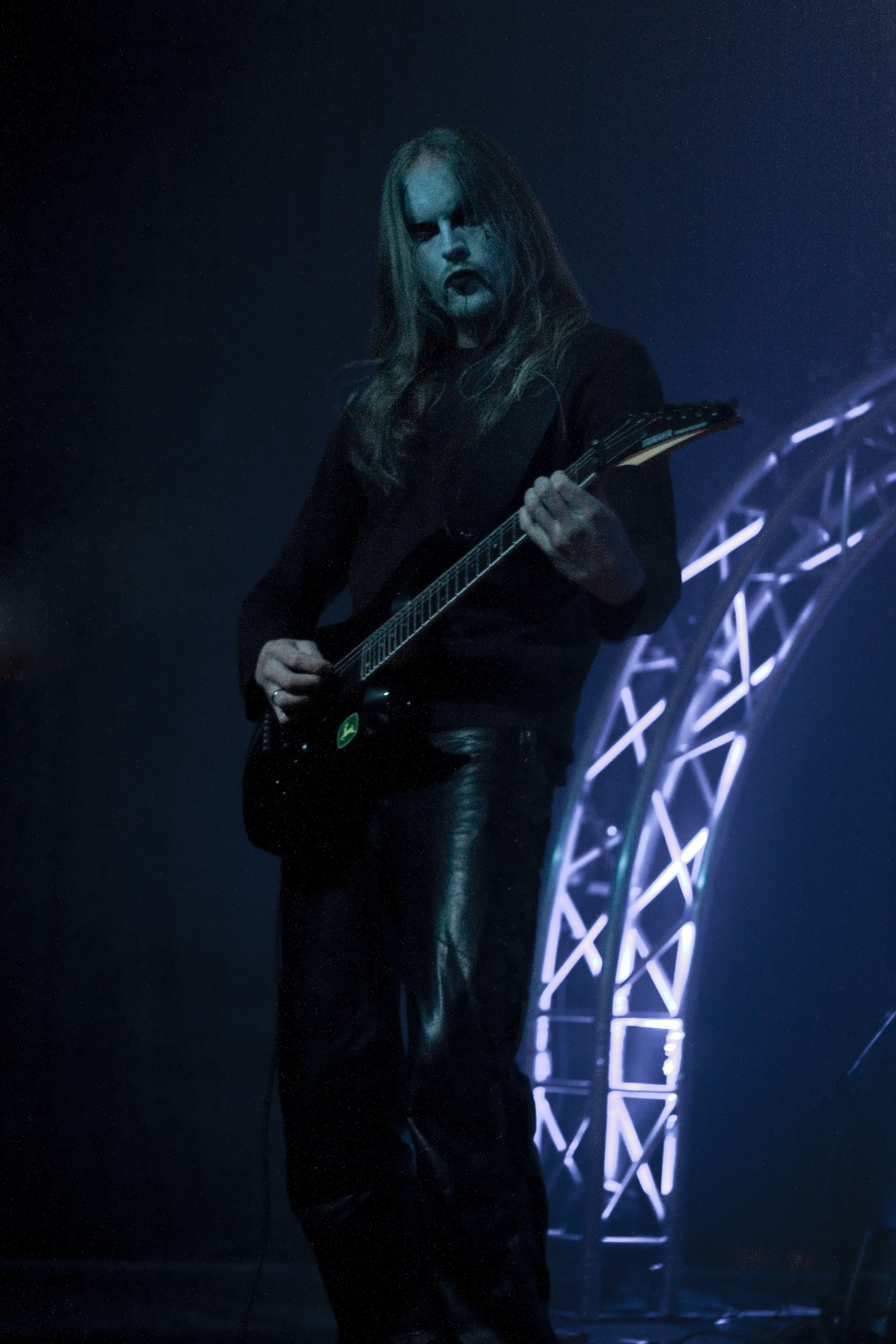
Lars Stokstad of Antestor, performing at Elements of Rock, 2011, in Switzerland. In the early 1990s, the band, under the name Crush Evil, earned notoriety as a Christian death and black metal band amidst antagonistic Norwegian black metal scene.

In Norway, amidst the early Norwegian black metal scene, the band Antestor formed in 1990, under name Crush Evil. In the first half of the 1990s, the band, which changed its name to Antestor in 1991, performed a mix of doom, death, black, and thrash metal, which they dubbed "sorrow metal". The presence of the band in a violently anti-Christian scene attracted negative attention. The black metal musician Faust, of the band Emperor, in an early 1990s interview with Euronymous, of the band Mayhem, asked if the existence of Crush Evil as a Christian death metal band was a sign of things going "too far". Faust asked Euronymous, "any advice on how we should kill them?" As their career progressed, Antestor gradually transitioned from death-doom to a black metal doom sound. In an HM review of the album Martyrium (recorded in 1994 but not released until 2000), Jamie Lee Rake asked "might Antestor have been a band of believers who were actually (sit down for this one) innovating in their scene?" The band is credited as the main act which birthed Northern Europe's Christian extreme metal scene.

=== Late 1990s developments ===
In the late 1990s, more bands further developed Christian death metal: Extol (founded in 1993 in Norway), the Finnish melodic death metal bands Immortal Souls (founded in 1991) and Deuteronomium (founded in 1993), Pantokrator (founded in Sweden in 1996), the United States bands Possession (founded in 1991), Feast Eternal (1992), and Aletheian (1997), Sacrificium (founded in Germany in 1993), and Antidemon (founded in Brazil in 1994).

==== Northern Europe ====
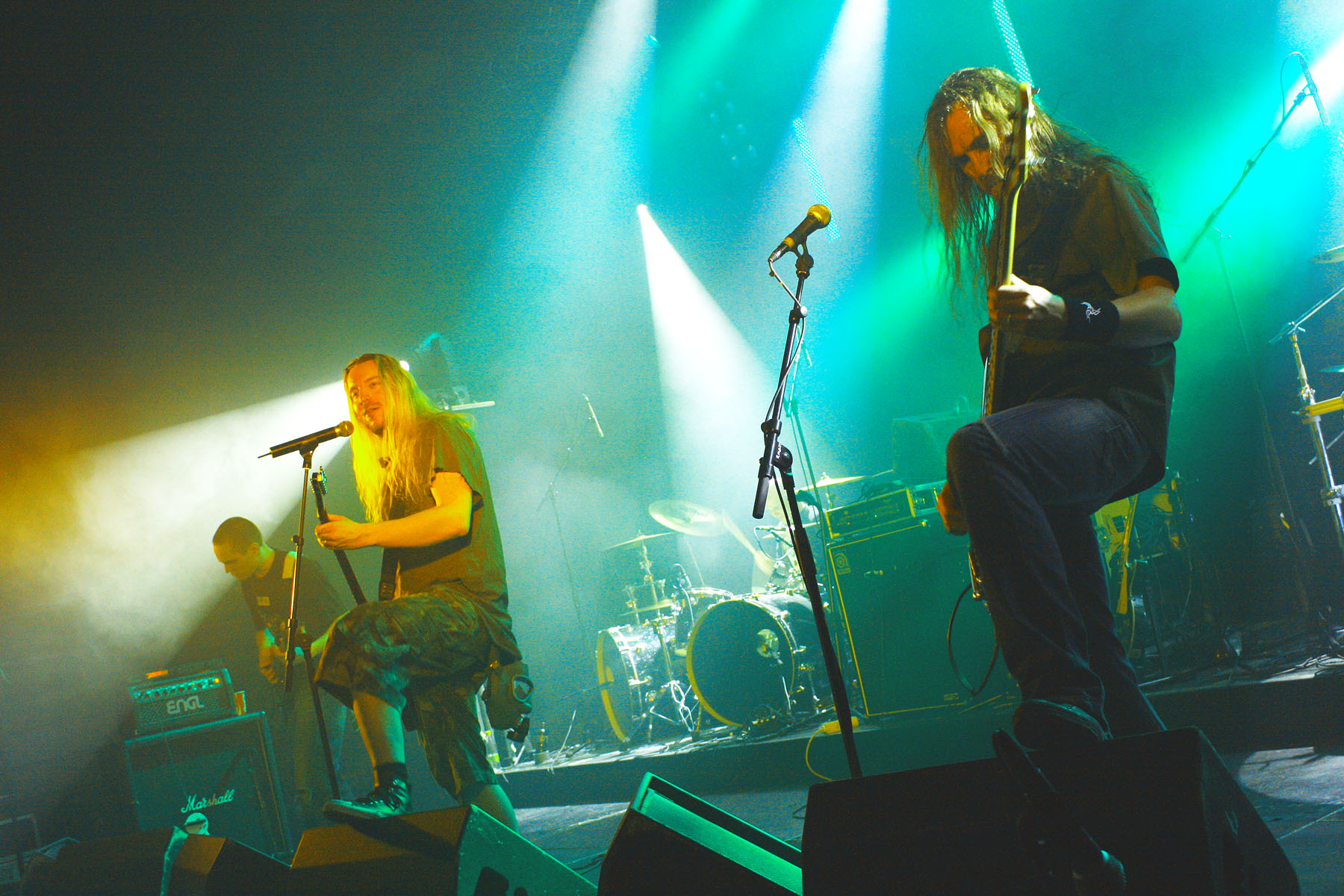
Deuteronomium live at Immortal Metal Fest, Kupittaan Palloiluhalli, Turku, Finland, in 2009

The earliest Finnish Christian metal group was the extreme metal band Destroyer of Black Metal, formed in 1990. The group released a few demos, including Death of a Soul, before disbanding. Aki Särkioja from the group then founded Immortal Souls, and Manu Lehtinen from the band founded Deuteronomium. The latter became a forerunner of Christian metal in Finland and is considered the first "big name". It was likely the most celebrated band in that scene. It released the EP Tribal Eagle in 1997 to great success. In 1998, Manu Lehtinen and Miika Partala from the band founded Little Rose Productions, a combined Christian metal record label and music importer and exporter – the first of its kind in Finland. Deuteronomium released their studio debut, Street Corner Queen, in 1998, through the label. The band achieved popularity beyond Finland, touring in Norway, the Netherlands, and Mexico, and selling out most of their 1990s releases. Deuteronomium then went through several hiatuses and line-up changes, but they and Immortal Souls outlasted their peers in the Finnish scene. Pantokrator immediately upon its founding in 1996 began releasing cassette demos, at first in a traditional death metal sound and then over time developing a more melodic and progressive sound. The short-lived band Tinnitus, from Jakobstad, in the late 1990s became an outlet for Christian teenagers from conservative free churches which were antagonistic to heavy metal.

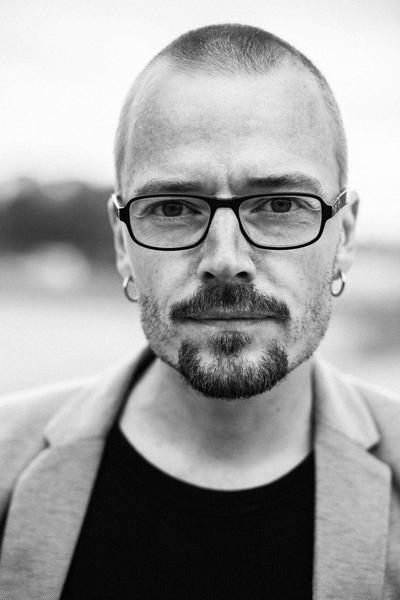
Ole Børud, a member of Extol and the co-founder of Schaliach and Fleshkiller

Schaliach, from Norway, was founded in 1995 and fused melodic death metal with doom metal, goth metal, black metal, and classical influences. Jillian Drachman for Metal Injection writes that "By finding their own sound, Schaliach was able to reconcile form and content to an extent that remains admirable though still imperfect." The angel statue depicted on the band's only studio album, Sonrise (1996), is, according to Drachman, a metaphor for how the band carved "a tribute to the divine" out of mostly hard and heavy music.

Ole Børud, half of the duo that comprised Schaliach, then went to join Extol in time for that band's 1998 debut studio album, Burial. That album, according to Lloyd Harp of HM, "may have single-handedly been responsible for the revival of Christ-centered extreme metal." AllMusic's Mike DaRonco considered the release "a breath of fresh air among a genre that relies on satanic gimmicks." In 1999, when asked if Norway had a separate Christian metal scene from the secular market, band member Peter Espevoll stated that "I get the feeling that over here [in the United States] it's very much Christian and then there's secular. Norway's approach is a bit, but not as much as here." According to Jesus Freak Hideout's Timothy Estabrooks, the band's 2000 release Undeceived was the "high water mark" of Christian death metal, "practically defining" the genre just as Mortification had years earlier. Per Estabrooks, Extol is – arguably, with respect to Mortification – the greatest Christian death metal act of all time.

Germany's Sacrificium was founded in 1993 as a thrash metal band named Corpus Christi. By the time of their first demo in 1994, the band had changed to a death metal sound, and following the release of the demo changed its name to Sacrificium. The band went through continual line-up changes, releasing a second demo in 1996 and a third, Mortal Fear, in 1998. This third release attracted media attention and received positive reviews. Still going through line-up changes, in 2000 the band continued to play live and supported acts such as Extol and My Darkest Hate.

==== United States ====
The band Possession formed in Kansas City in 1991 and promulgated a style that mixed thrash metal with death metal, black metal, and traditional and speed metal. Despite being very underground and putting out only a minimal amount of music which remains largely unknown, the band was critically acclaimed and proved influential in Christian extreme metal and members went on to join the bands Frost Like Ashes, Elgibbor, and Unblack Metal Fist. Feast Eternal, formed 1992 in the United States, debuted in 1999 with Prisons of Flesh, which, despite being an underground release, sold well both in the United States and internationally in Europe and South America. Embodyment, formed in 1992 in the United States, started as a death metal band and then became a pioneer of the deathcore genre with their 1998 debut, Embrace the Eternal. The release is considered possibly the earliest example of deathcore. In the mid-1990s, Harry Rocco, the founding member of the secular death metal band Decayed Existence, converted to Christianity and the band released two Christian death metal albums, In Due Time in 1997 and Violent by Design in 1998, before disbanding. Aletheian, a technical death metal band, formed in 1997 under the name Crutch and released a few albums independently, building up a fanbase.

==== Latin America ====
Lament was founded in Mexico in 1993 under the name Beheaded. Debuting in 1997 with Tear of the Leper, the band became Mexico's premier underground death metal group. In 1994, Antidemon was formed in São Paulo, Brazil, by Carlos Batista. In 1996, Ana Batista (no relation), a member of Terrorista Punk, planned to assassinate Carlos while he was preaching in church but instead had a conversion experience. In 1998, Batista launched an unconventional church and ministry, Crash Church Underground Ministry, an evangelical church ministry which intersperses the service with rock songs and provides an alternative to traditional churches which are more critical of rock music and fashion, and Ana Batista became one of the most involved in that ministry.

=== Subsequent developments (early 2000s to present) ===
The scene has so proliferated in Scandinavia that Christian death metal festivals have appeared. Apart from the abundance of festivals in North America, the scholar Matthew Peter Unger in 2016 found that very little scholarship exists of the contemporary Christian extreme metal scenes in the United States and Canada. He attributes this to the underground nature of these scenes, which rely on the Internet and broad international and secular coverage.

==== Europe ====
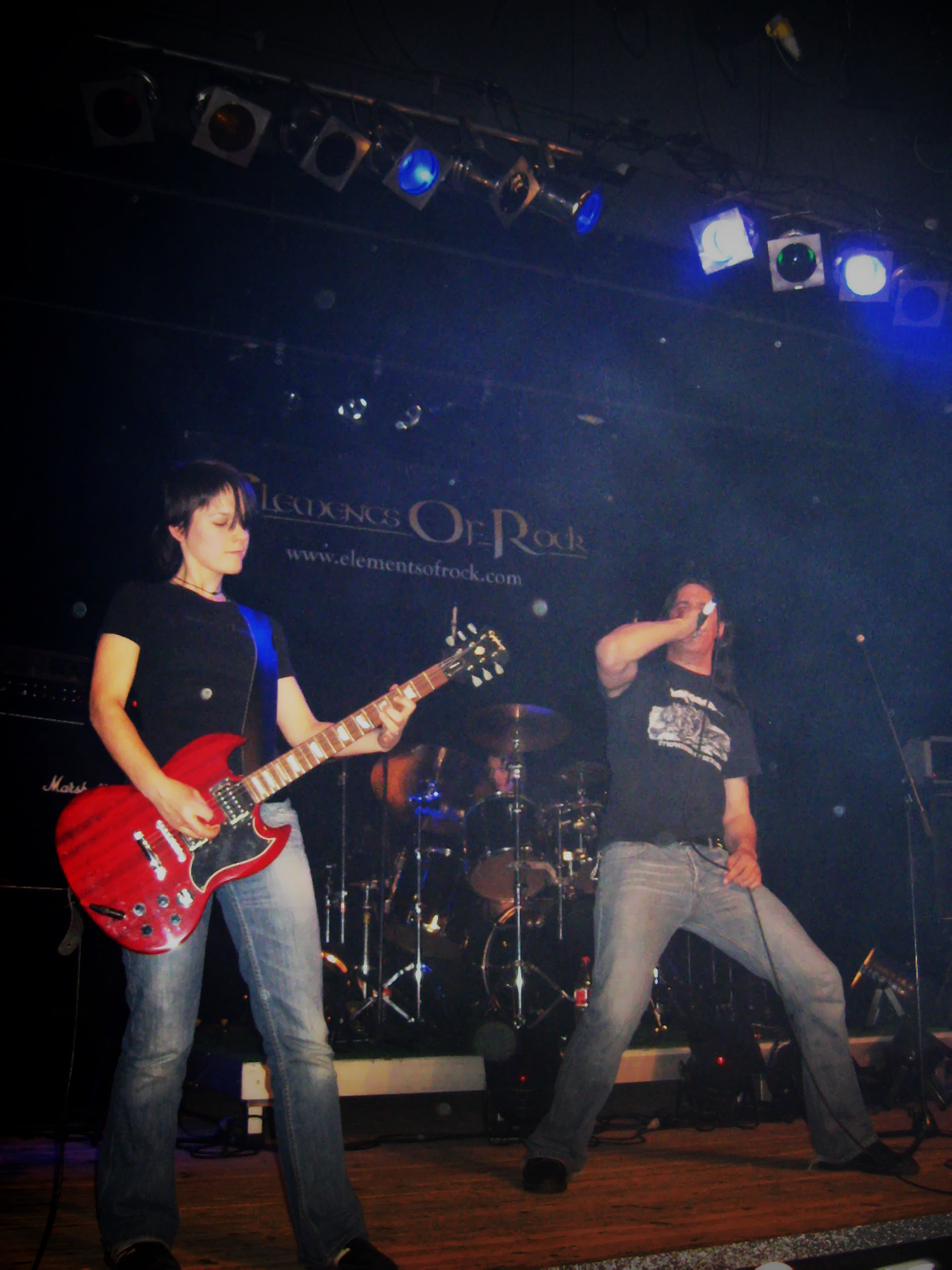
Sacrificium live at Elements of Rock, Uster, Switzerland, in 2007

After the first breakup of Deuteronomium, the record store portion of Little Rose Productions was sold to Lasse Niskala and Päivi Niemii, who then started Maanalainen Levykauppa/The Underground Record Store. This became one the largest Christian music retail outlets in Finland. In the Finnish Christian death metal scene, Meggidon and Hilastherion emerged alongside the older Immortal Souls and Deuteronomium. Immortal Souls' third studio album, Wintereich, was released in 2007 and was deemed by HM to be the band's best release. In Germany, Sacrificium managed to stabilize their lineup and release Cold Black Piece of Flesh in 2002, although the release was delayed due to issues with the cover art. After the release of Escaping the Stupor in 2005, the band was considered among Germany's death metal elite. In Ukraine, the band Holy Blood formed in 1999, initially as a hardcore and deathgrind band, then transitioning to a melodic death metal style before settling on a folk metal sound in 2002 that blends black and death metal. Most Ukrainian Christian extreme metal bands which now exist are either influenced by or had members play in Holy Blood. In the early 2000s, Pantokrator's sound evolved into a mix of death, black, thrash, and doom metal for their album Song of Solomon, released in 2001 first as a standalone recording and then as a split album with the blackened death metal band Sanctifica. The band's 2014 release Incarnate was called by HM's Collin Simula a rare example of Christian death metal that does not sound sub-par or forced. Simula also credited the band for avoiding breakdowns and deathcore sounds which by this time were typical of the genre. Pantokrator released a fourth album, Marching Out of Babylon, in 2021, and was noted for remaining a consistent and influential band in the scene. The same year, Andrew Voigt of HM included the band in its list of five must-hear death metal bands for 2021.

==== South Africa ====
HM's 2021 list of five must-hear death metal bands included Incarnate Deity, a project from South Africa. The magazine noted the intentional elusiveness of the project's membership, something more typical of black metal rather than death metal. The project released Theodicy in 2020.

==== North America ====
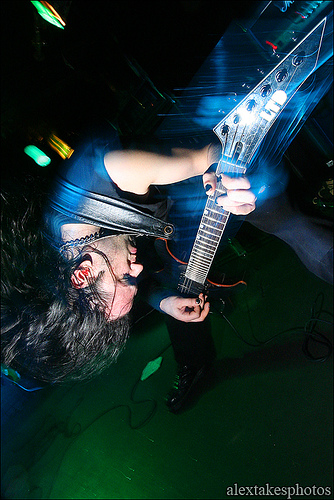
Alex Kenis of Aletheian and Becoming the Archetype, playing with the latter at the Camden Underworld on February 5, 2007

Sympathy, still as a one-member band, secured a record deal with the Dutch label Fear Dark and released their studio debut, Invocation, in 2002. Subsequent that release, the rest of the band's lineup began to fill out and they released Arcane Path in 2004 and Anagogic Tyranny in 2008.

Aletheian, still under the name Crutch, released Hope Prevails in 2001, then changed the band lineup and their name to Aletheian in for their studio debut, Apolutrosis, in 2003. A second studio album, Dying Vine, followed in 2005, with a re-release in 2008. In 1999, the progressive death metal band Becoming the Archetype formed in the United States and became a leader in the Christian death metal scene. Originally calling themselves Nonexistent Failure, they then changed their name to The Remnant and independently released an album under that name. They then adopted their final name, Becoming the Archetype. The band signed to Solid State Records in 2004 and debuted with Terminate Damnation in 2005. After extensive touring and some lineup changes, which included Aletheian's Alex Kenis joining the group, they released The Physics of Fire in 2007. Kenis then returned to Aletheian. 2008's follow-up, Dichotomy, debuted at No. 18 on the Billboard Heatseekers charts. After a brief hiatus, the band released their fourth album, Celestial Completion, which debuted at No. 7 on the Heatseekers chart. Every member of the band except Seth Hecox then left. Hecox reformed the band for 2012's I Am, after which Becoming the Archetype went on a ten-year hiatus. The band returned with 2022's Children of the Great Extinction. In 2002, the American grindcore band Tortured Conscience was included on the Arachnid Terror Sampler compilation and contributed a rendition of "The Little Drummer Boy" on the metal-style Christmas compilation A Brutal Christmas: The Season in Chaos. The latter contribution was considered by Kerrang! Radio to be "easily the standout track" from the compilation. Tortured Conscience then released Every Knee Shall Bow, a "grindcore masterpiece", in 2006, before breaking up. Over a decade later, in 2023, the reformed band released One Law One King.

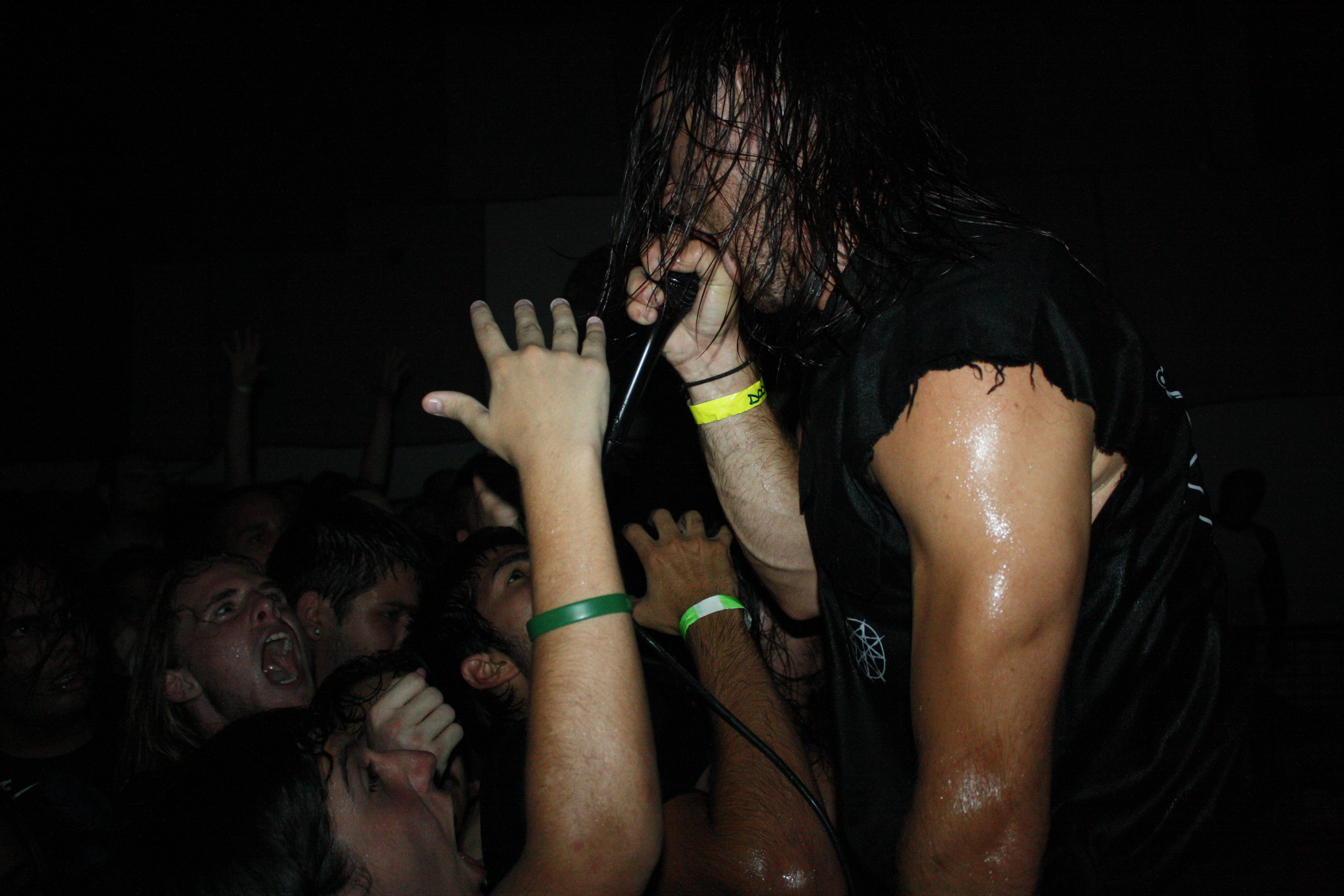
Impending Doom at the Dugout, Miami, Florida, United States, on June 22, 2009

In the 2000s, the American metalcore bands Underoath, As I Lay Dying, Norma Jean, and Demon Hunter emerged and quickly rose to become some of the leading bands in the general hard rock market. Underoath on their first two albums, Act of Depression (1999) and Cries of the Past (2000), performed a sound that combined death and black metal with hardcore punk. Demon Hunter, Norman Jean, and As I Lay Dying all received labels from press coverage as Christian death metal bands. Demon Hunter's 2002 debut was labeled by CMJ as "Christian death metal at its finest." Likewise, Norma Jean's debut from the same year saw the band labeled as Christian death metal by Orlando Weekly. Heaven's Metal Magazine in 2017 noted that Demon Hunter incorporates the catchiness of melodic death metal into its eclectic sound, and Metal Injection stated that the band's 2024 single "Worlds Apart" would fit into any melodic death metal album from 2002 to 2008. Throughout their discography, As I Lay Dying included varying amounts of melodic death metal, borrowing from both the Swedish and American sonic templates for the genre. The band, in addition to metalcore, has been categorized as death metal and melodic death metal.

Impending Doom formed in 2005 and has since become one of the more recognizable Christian death metal bands. Performing death metal and grindcore blended into a form of brutal death metal, the band after its 2007 debut was considered by Cosmo Lee of Stylus Magazine to perhaps be the most extreme in its scene. In the mid 2000s, Decayed Existence reformed; it released Eulogy in 2018 and the EP The Beginning of Sorrows in 2024. In 2009, the deathcore group In the Midst of Lions formed and released their debut, Out of Darkness. Their second album, The Heart of Man, released in 2010, charted at No. 30 on the Billboard Heatseekers charts and thematically was considered by Exclaim! to be "as dark as a Christian death metal act can get." The band headlined the Young and Restless Tour, and released its third album, Shadows, in 2011, which charted at No. 13 on the Heatseekers charts. In 2021, three bands from the United States were listed by HM as among five must-hear death metal bands: Symphony of Heaven, a blackened death metal group, In Conquered, a death and doom metal group, and Mangled Carpenter, which performs deathgrind.

Latin America

Brazil's Antidemon grew in popularity to become internationally renowned. Over a span of 20 years, they toured internationally in South, Central, and North America, Europe, and Asia. In 2017, the band was noted for performing in Cuba and distributing copies of The Metal Bible at the concert.

==== Australia ====
In 2010, Jayson Sherlock and Sheldon D'Costa, after the demise of their previous band, inExordium, formed the brutal death metal band Revulsed. The 2015 debut, Infernal Atrocity, made an end-of-the-year list of Metal Injection for the best metal albums of 2015.

==== South Asia ====
Blood Covenant, from Chennai, formed in 2004 and is one of the pioneers of the extreme metal scene in South India. The founder, Eddie Prithviraj, had previously founded the extreme metal band Bone Saw in the early 1990s, and formed Blood Covenant four years after that band broke up. Since the 1990s and the founding of Bone Saw, Prithviraj has worked heavily as a promoter of and event manager for the heavy metal music scene in South India, which saw an explosion of popularity in the 2000s.

== See also ==
- List of Christian death metal bands
