= Opprobrium =

Opprobrium may refer to:

- Opprobrium, disgrace arising from exceedingly shameful conduct (see shame)
- Opprobrium (band), a death metal band from Louisiana founded in 1986
