= Indwelling =

Indwelling may refer to:

- Indwelling (band), a Christian death metal band
- The Indwelling, a 2000 book in the Left Behind series
- "Indwelling", an 1893 poem by Thomas Edward Brown

== See also ==
- Indwelling catheter, a catheter left inside the body
