= Karrionic Hacktician =

Studio album by Vomitorial Corpulence
- Released: 2006
- Recorded: 1995 • 2002
- Genre: Christian metal • goregrind
- Length: 23:41
- Label: Christ Core

Vomitorial Corpulence chronology
Skin Stripper (1998)	Karrionic Hacktician (2006)	6-Way Sin Decomposition (2007)

Karrionic Hacktician is the 2006 second studio album by the Australian Christian goregrind band Vomitorial Corpulence, released under the band's own Christ Core Records. The music on the recording album is a stand-alone re-release of material from a 1995 compilation that the band appeared on, plus two demo recordings from 2002.

== Background and recording ==
Vomitorial Corpulence, formed in 1993 as a Christian version of goregrind music, was highly influential on the emerging Christian death metal scene in the early 1990s. Paul Green, on guitars, formed the band with Mark Hamilton on bass and Alexander O'Neil on drums. They spent three days recording twenty-three songs for an album titled Karrionic Hacktician. This was released on a cassette and then Steve Rowe contacted the group to express interest in releasing the material on a compilation album he was putting together on his record label. The band agreed, and in 1995 all the songs were released as part of the compilation The Extreme Truth — Australian Metal Compilation III.

O'Neil then left the band. After a new drummer was hired, Vomitorial Corpulence released their first studio album, Skin Stripper. The band then went on hiatus and in 2001 Green moved to the United States and married Maria. He reformed the band with Maria on bass and Ziggy Peters and Johnathan Kellerman on vocals. During this time, demo tracks were recorded for a new album, scheduled to be released on June 24, 2002, later delayed to 2003. Alleging that Morbid was pressuring the band to abandon its Christian lyrical focus, the band left the label. Due to lack of a drummer, the band went on a second hiatus.

In August 2006, having moved back to Australia, Green started the band back up with Hamilton and Valentine. Karrionic Hacktician was re-mastered and released as a stand-alone recording in 2006, with new artwork and two demo tracks from 2002 included. The two additional tracks were remastered at Fox Studios, Fitzroy, Victoria.

== Style and lyrics ==
"Hammering Satan's Head" describes Jesus Christ inflicting gory violence on Satan.

Crossover AGM's Dirk Hottenbacher described the style on the album as "hacking, smashing grindcore". Attilio Rizzoli of Whitemetal.it described the album as grindcore, and more specifically goregrind. Most songs do not even reach a minute in length, some of them lasting only a few seconds—for example, "The Answer to Life is...", "Dust to Dust", "Eternal Majesty", and "You Choose". The two bonus tracks feature less gore in the lyrics, but stylistically fit with the goregrind music present on the rest of the album. The scholar Eric S. Strother cites the song "Hammering Satan's Head", which describes Jesus inflicting gory violence against Satan, as an example of Christian metal bands teaching that "it is acceptable to direct anger and violence toward Satan and those who are seen as his direct agents (such as 'the Antichrist'), but violence against other people is not advocated in any way."

== Reception ==
Professional ratings
Review scores
Source	Rating
Whitemetal.it	95/100

Dirk Hottenbacher of the German youth ministry Crossover AGM said that the band manages to both take their Christian message seriously while being playfully humorous. He summarized that anyone who enjoys "fun" grindcore would appreciate the release. Whitemetal.it's Attilio Rizzoli rated the album a 95 out of 100. They noted that after the original release of the material, it came to be revered as a masterpiece of the genre. They concurred that each song, including the two new tracks, is masterful, from the vocals to the instrumentation to the lyrics. They considered the vocals to be perhaps the best there are for the goregrind genre. They also praised the production value, cover art, and the humor of the album booklet. Jason McLaren, in a feature in Heaven's Metal on Christian goregrind, described the album as "ludicrous-sounding grind that bordered on the ridiculous and the frightening all at the same time."

== Track listing ==
No.	Title	Length
1.	"Self Extinction"	1:24
2.	"Divine Emperor"	0:04
3.	"Prodigal Son"	1:07
4.	"The Answer to Life is..."	0:05
5.	"Baptised into Death"	0:26
6.	"Once and for All"	0:15
7.	"Hammering Satan's Head"	0:44
8.	"Going Against the Grain"	0:05
9.	"Suffering the Aftermath"	0:40
10.	"Provider of All"	0:06
11.	"Blood Bath Cleansing"	1:09
12.	"Your Choice"	0:05
13.	"Well of Happiness"	0:34
14.	"Embrace the Afterlife"	0:07
15.	"First You Suffer, then You Die"	0:15
16.	"Human Slaughter House"	0:31
17.	"Eternal Majesty"	0:04
18.	"Dust to Dust"	0:06
19.	"Demonic Decapitation"	1:12
20.	"Human Platter Menu"	0:07
21.	"Bludgeoned to Death"	0:49
22.	"Surgical Disgorgement"	0:24
23.	"Analysis Complete"	0:12

Bonus tracks

No.	Title	Length
24.	"Zion"	5:55
25.	"Unseen Battle"	7:15
Total length:		23:41

== Personnel ==
- Paul Green – Guitar, vocals
- Mark Hamilton – Bass, vocals (tracks 1–23)
- Alexander O'Neil – Drums (tracks 1–23)
- Maria Green – Bass (tracks 24 and 25)
- Ziggy Peters – Vocals (tracks 24 and 25)
- Johnathan Kellerman – Vocals – (tracks 24 and 25)
- Paul Fox – Remastering
