= No Reserves. No Retreats. No Regrets. =

EP by Overcome
- Released: January 18, 2013
- Genre: Christian metal, metalcore, Hardcore
- Length: 21:51
- Label: Facedown
- Producer: Overcome

Overcome chronology
The Great Campaign of Sabotage (2011)	No Reserves. No Retreats. No Regrets. (2013)

No Reserves. No Retreats. No Regrets. is an extended play from Overcome. Facedown Records released the album on January 18, 2013. This album was produced by Overcome.

== Reception ==
Professional ratings
Review scores
Source	Rating
Cross Rhythms	7/10 squares
HM Magazine	4.5/5 stars
Indie Vision Music	4/5 stars

Giving the EP a seven out of ten review at Cross Rhythms, Oscar Hyde writes, "this is a solid entry from veterans of the craft." Rob Shameless, rating the EP four and a half stars by HM Magazine, states, "If your a long-time fan of Overcome, you will love this record." Awarding the EP four stars for Indie Vision Music, Chris Bach says, "you get exactly what you’d expect."

== Tracks ==
All tracks are written by Overcome.

No.	Title	Length
1.	"Verum"	3:11
2.	"Spirit and Flesh"	2:10
3.	"Travail"	2:37
4.	"Indwelling"	4:11
5.	"No Reserves. No Repeats. No Regrets."	3:13
6.	"Animate the Lifeless"	3:06
7.	"Depredation of the Cherished"	3:23
Total length:		21:51

== Credits ==
Overcome

- Jason Bowen - Bass
- Steven Cosand - Guitar
- Jason Stinson - Guitar, Vocals
- Jon Strunk - Drums
- Thomas Washington - Vocals

Production

- Andrew P. Glover - Engineer, Mastering, Mixing
- Dave Quiggle - Design, Layout
- Kiel Siler - Band Photo
- Ryan "Bart" Williams - Engineer
