= Wintereich =

Studio album by Immortal Souls
- Released: June 1, 2007
- Recorded: December 8, 2006 – February 18, 2007 at Studio Watercastle and Studio 3rd Track
- Genre: Melodic death metal
- Length: 45:36
- Label: Dark Balance (EU); Facedown Records (US and Canada)
- Producer: Immortal Souls

Immortal Souls chronology
Ice Upon the Night (2003)	Wintereich (2007)	IV: The Requiem for the Art of Death (2011)

Wintereich is the third studio album by Finnish melodic death metal band Immortal Souls. It is Immortal Souls' first album released by the Dutch Dark Balance record label. It was released on June 1, 2007 in Europe.

Wintereich was recorded December 8, 2006 – February 18, 2007 at Studio Watercastle and Studio 3rd Track. The album was mixed by Arttu Sarvanne during February 5.–13, 2007. Wintereich was mastered by Svante Forsbäck at Chartmakers, Helsinki on March 8, 2007. The album layout was designed by Jeff Arwadi through Soundmind Graphics.

Wintereich is a story based concept album divided to 4 chapters. It continues on the band's melodic death metal style.

== Track listing ==
Chapter I – The Awakening
No.	Title	Length
1.	"Nightfrost"	4:25
2.	"Feareaper"	3:27
3.	"Frozen Inside"	3:12

Chapter II – Reflections of Doom
No.	Title	Length
4.	"Icon of Ice"	3:43
5.	"Color of My Sky"	3:34
6.	"Constant"	3:29

Chapter III – The Shadow of the Valley of Death
No.	Title	Length
7.	"Idlestate"	4:54
8.	"Heart of Cold"	4:07

Chapter IV – The Passage
No.	Title	Length
9.	"Winter of My Discontent"	3:29
10.	"Black Water"	4:09
11.	"Wintereich"	6:54

== Personnel ==
- Aki Särkioja – vocals, bass
- Esa Särkioja – guitar
- Pete Loisa – guitar
- Juha Kronqvist – drums
