= Overcome (band) =

American Christian metalcore band

- Origin: Phoenix, Arizona
- Genres: Metalcore, Christian metal
- Years active: 1993–2000, 2010–2017
- Labels: Tooth & Nail, Facedown, Solid State, Life Sentence
- Members: Jason Stinson; Jason Bowen; Jon Strunk; Thomas Washington; Steven Cosand
- Past members: Justin Gage; Matt Burnside; Chris Davis; Ryan Hayes; BJ Ovsak; Nick Westby; Steve Owens; Matt Brooks; Ethan Pajak; Reggie Shumway; Jason Obergfoll; Ken Williamson; Alex Woodford; Nick Greenwood
- Website: Overcome on Facebook

Overcome are an American Christian metalcore band. They come from Phoenix, Arizona. The band started making music in 1993 until their decade-long hiatus from 2000 to 2010, when they commenced making music again. Tooth & Nail Records released the band's first two albums, Blessed Are the Persecuted in 1996 and When Beauty Dies in 1997. Facedown Records has released the other albums from the band signed the band. They released Immortal Until Their Work Is Done in 1999, More Than Death in 2001, The Great Campaign of Sabotage in 2011, and No Reserves. No Retreats. No Regrets. in 2013. They were one of the first "Spirit-Filled Hardcore" bands, along with Unashamed, Focused, Strongarm, and Zao. They were the first band signed to Facedown Records. The band is playing at Facedown Fest 2017.

They were covered in several HM Magazine issues, as well as others.

== History ==
Overcome is a Christian metal and hardcore band from Phoenix, Arizona. The band was originally called Abstain and began in 1993, led by Chad Oliver on vocals and guitars. Ryan Hayes was on drums, Reggie Shumway on guitars, and Jason Obergfoll on bass. With the four, they searched for a vocalist until it was decided that Jason Stinson had a unique sound and would perform the vocals. With good conscience and the one and only time they used a moral compass in this facet, they changed the name to keep from taking or leaving undo credit. Overcome was born. 1993 the 4 members were Jason Stinson on vocals, Reggie Shumway on guitar, Jason Obergfoll on bass guitar and Ryan Hayes on drums. With the lineup, the band, influenced heavily by Focused, Unbroken, and a few others, began to work on music, eventually recording a self-titled EP, followed by a second EP, As the Curtain Falls. After speaking with Tim Mann of Focused, the band set forward to sign with Tooth & Nail Records to release their record.

In 1996, after signing their record deal with Tooth & Nail, the band released their debut album, Blessed Are the Persecuted. After playing some shows around their state and some in California alongside Focused and many other bands, the band recorded their sophomore album, When Beauty Dies, which would also be the first release on Solid State Records. Following the album, Stinson was deciding that members with families were more entitled to money earned than the members who had put in years of work to establish the band, but claimed he was worried about his fellow members, which consisted of Shumway, Obergfoll, and two newer members Bassist Ken Williamson and Drummer Alex Woodford, spiritual lives and spoke with them. However, after this conversation, the entire band, save for Stinson, left the band.

Despite this, Stinson decided to push forward and continue the band. Tooth & Nail would, however, void their contract, which left the band independent. After gathering a new lineup, Nick Westby on guitars, Ethan Pajak on drums, BJ Ovsak on guitars, and Matt Brooks on bass, the band was offered a deal by Facedown Records, which led to their signing and re-issuing of their debut EP and the new EP, Life of Death. With the new lineup, the band began working on new material to release through Facedown, despite receiving offers to re-sign with Tooth & Nail and Solid State. In 1999, the band recorded and released their third album, Immortal Until Their Work is Done, with the label. The album was recorded in October 1996 at Phase Four Studios in Tempe, Arizona and was released on March 18, 1997. In 2000, Brooks departed from the band which led to Jason Bowen rejoining the band; he previously filled in after Williamson quit the band. The band continued on until 2000, performing their final show on August 12, 2000 at Birmingham, Alabama's Furnace Fest. According to Stinson, the band disbanded because, at the end of their shows, he began to cough up blood. After Overcome disbanded, he began Indwelling alongside Pajak, Ovsak, and his friend Thomas Washington on vocals, as he wanted to continue music but was unable to continue with vocals. In response, Facedown Records issued a compilation featuring past works of the band titled More Than Death in 2001.

In 2010, Stinson met Jon Strunk, who he noted was a great drummer. Not wanting to let the talent go to waste, he wanted to start a band with Strunk and his former bandmate in Indwelling, Thomas Washington. Eventually, he decided to reunite as Overcome, with him focusing on guitar playing and Washington on vocals. With Bowen returning on bass and Nick Greenwood joining on guitars, the band reunited and recorded their fourth album, which was titled The Great Campaign of Sabotage, which took a more death metal orientation for the band. Their longtime friend, who also had been a part of Indwelling at one point, Jarrod Norris, would contribute vocals to the release. Norris was initially supposed to take over vocals for Washington, as he was planning on moving. However, this did not occur. Following the release, Greenwood departed from the band and was replaced by Steven Cosand. In 2013, the band with this lineup recorded their next EP, No Reserves. No Retreats. No Regrets., which would also be released through Facedown. In 2017, the band performed at Facedown Fest, which marked 20 years of the label’s existence, as their last show.

== Music history ==
Their works have been chronicled at Cross Rhythms, where they reviewed Immortal Until Their Work Is Done, More Than Death, The Great Campaign of Sabotage, and No Reserves. No Retreats. No Regrets. Their EP, The Life of Death, had two reviews at The Phantom Tollbooth where they were highly critical of the music.

== Members ==
Current members

- Jason Stinson – guitar, (2010–present) vocals (1993-2000) (ex-Indwelling)
- Jason Bowen - bass (1998, 2000, 2010–present) (ex-Every Day Life)
- Jon Strunk - drums (2010–present)
- Thomas Washington - vocals (2010–present) (ex-Indwelling, ex-Abishai)
- Steven Cosand - guitar (2011–present) (Sanhedrin, Quaker Folk, Cryptic Rising)

Former members

- Justin Gage – guitar, vocals (–2010)
- Matt Burnside – drums
- Chris Davis – vocals
- Ryan Hayes - drums (1993-1996)
- BJ Ovsak - guitar (1998-2000) (ex-Indwelling)
- Nick Westby - guitar (1998-2000)
- Steve Owens - guitar (1998, 2000)
- Matt Brooks - bass (1998-2000)
- Ethan Pajak - drums (1998-2000) (ex-Indwelling)
- Reggie Shumway – guitar (1993-1998)
- Jason Obergfoll – guitar, (1996-1998) bass (1993-1996)
- Ken Williamson – bass (1996-1998)
- Alex Woodford – drums (1996-1998)
- Nick Greenwood – guitars (2010-2011)
- Rob Kroehler – bass (1996)

== Discography ==
Studio albums

- Blessed Are the Persecuted (June 7, 1996, Tooth & Nail Records)
- When Beauty Dies (March 18, 1997, Tooth & Nail Records)
- Immortal Until Their Work Is Done (April 21, 2001, Facedown Records)
- More Than Death (October 2, 2001, Facedown Records)
- The Great Campaign of Sabotage (February 1, 2011, Facedown Records)

EPs

- Overcome (1995, independent)
- As the Curtain Falls (1996, Life Sentence Records)
- Overcome (1998, Facedown Records; Re-release)
- The Life of Death (1998, Facedown Records)
- No Reserves. No Retreats. No Regrets. (January 8, 2013, Facedown Records)
