= Skin Stripper =

Studio album by Vomitorial Corpulence
- Released: 1998
- Recorded: December 1998
- Studios: Happy Valley Studios, Melbourne, Australia • Fox Studios, Melbourne, Australia
- Genres: Christian metal, grindcore, goregrind
- Length: 27:24
- Label: Christ Core
- Producer: Vomitorial Corpulence

Vomitorial Corpulence chronology
The Extreme Truth – Australian Metal Compilation III (1995)	Skin Stripper (1998)	Karrionic Hacktician (2006)

Skin Stripper is the 1998 debut studio album by the Australian Christian goregrind band Vomitorial Corpulence, released independently by the band on Christ Core Records.

== Background and recording ==
Vomitorial Corpulence, formed in 1992 as a Christian version of goregrind music, was highly influential on the emerging Christian death metal scene in the early 1990s. The band had previously released material—collectively titled Karrionic Hacktician—in 1995 as part of the compilation The Extreme Truth – Australian Metal Compilation III by Rowe Productions, material which the band considers its debut release. The band's original drummer, Keith O'Neil, left the group after that release. The remaining members sought a new drummer, even eventually trying to use a drum machine, which was not satisfactory. Chris Valentine then contacted the group and joined on as a new drummer. The band began writing new material within days, taking about nine months to complete the process. Skin Stripper was recorded in December 1998, over one-and-a-half days. Vocals and guitar solos were overdubbed separately.

== Artwork ==
The cover of Skin Stripper renders Stefan Lochner's depiction of the flaying of Bartholomew the Apostle in the painting Last Judgement. The inner packaging includes more images from Last Judgement which depict 11 of the disciples being martyred, as well as graphic medical photographs of human bodies with blood and exposed viscera.

== Style and lyrical themes ==
The sound of Skin Stripper was described by Brian Giffin in his Encyclopaedia of Australian Heavy Metal as "sheer grind chaos" similar to the early recordings of Carcass. Jason McLaren of Heaven's Metal likewise compared the band to early Carcass. Cole Bezotte of Heaven's Metal likewise identified an influence from Carcass, specifically in the gory medical themes, aspects of the sound, and even a version of the band's logo. Bezotte felt that Skin Stripper featured more groove compared to Karrionic Hacktician's "splatter" aesthetic, suggesting that the band took inspiration from acts like Napalm Death. The music journalist Matt Morrow described the recording as grindcore and goregrind. Vaake of White Metal described the group as "pure gore metal". Some tracks include samples from splatter film scenes, including a clip from Brain Dead. Two tracks, "Hillbilly Heaven" and "Barnyard Grind", feature country music melded with grindcore. White Metal described the music as indescribably heavy, deep, and oppressive, with brutal, very fast-paced outbursts along with technical slowdowns. The entire 27 tracks are played through in as many minutes; many of the songs last only a few seconds. The vocals range from low-gutturals to high-pitched shrieks.

The lyrics of the album range from the genre-typical anatomical, physiological, and pathological descriptions, such as on "Grotesque Macoparalent Disgorgement", to depictions of extreme violence against Satan—"Hammer Inflicted Brain Seizure and Hemorrhaging Cranial Gestation", "Cudgelate Mephistopheles Brutality", and "CITDC" ("Christ is the Demon Crusher")—to deep expressions of faith in Jesus Christ, such as on "Malignant Cankerous Brain Feast and Tumorous Cerebral Beverage of the Cranium", "Defleshed", and "Curse or Blessing". Similarly, "Festering Insalubrious Bowel Hemorrhaging of Gangrenous Pustulosus and Abdominal Abscess Discharge of the Intestinal Tract" focuses on repentance from sin.

== Release ==
Skin Stripper was released before the end of 1998. Just after the record was completed, Valentine left the band due to a conflict between him and the other members. Hamilton exited the band a short time later, leaving Green to promote the album himself. Due to the profanities in the recording and liner notes, many Christian retailers in the United States refused to sell the album. In 2002, after Green moved to the United States, he signed the band, now reformed with a new lineup, to Morbid Records. That label re-released Skin Stripper, with alternative artwork and no lyric sheet. The band claims that they received no royalties for the Morbid re-release.

== Reception and legacy ==
Professional ratings
Review scores
Source	Rating
White Metal	80/100
Matt Morrow	8/10 stars

In a 2026 retroactive review, Cole Bezotte from Heaven's Metal called the album "impressive all the way through." Per Bezotte, in comparison to the band's previous release the drum stand out more, the vocals are "sicker", and the guitars "have even more of a chainsaw shred." He singled out the track "CITDC" as his favorite, both for the sample from Brain Dead and the song's catchiness. A year prior, in an article in the about Christian grindcore for the same publication, Jason McLaren wrote that Skin Stripper "remains the classic" of the band's brief career. Both journalists noted that copies of the release are now extremely difficult to find.

Alexander Kiryushkin of Ultimate Guitar, highlighting Skin Stripper in his 2019 discussion of the band, said that Christian goregrind might seem to be an incongruous combination, yet it works. He said of the band that "There's not much to be said about Vomitorial Corpulence. It's better to hear them once." Dirk Hottenbacher of the German youth ministry organization CrossOver remarked on how the band managed to stretch some songs over two minutes long without compromising the heaviness of their sound, and praised their humor with inclusion of country music interludes. He praised Morbid Records for recognizing the talent of the band and re-issuing the album.

Valerio Mei from White Metal rated the album eighty out of one hundred. They found the music challenging and difficult to listen to and felt that the poor production quality did not properly showcase the heaviness and oppressiveness of the music. They also found some the distorted vocals unlistenable. They singled out "Festering Insalubrious Bowel Hemorrhaging of Gangrenous Pustulosus and Abdominal Abscess Discharge of the Intestinal Tract" for particular praise, calling it "great". The song begins hyper fast, then becomes more technical, than returns to a hyper fast pace. They concluded with a praise of the recording: "here's to you, this very strange creature, Christian gore!"

Matt Morrow rated the album eight out of ten, summarizing the recording as a "really heavy album that I really enjoy a lot." He recommended the recording if for no other reason than to hear how heavy the band is. He did warn that some profanities occur in the lyrics and the liner notes: "Pathetic" includes the line "Jesus is no bullshit", "Christ the Demon Crusher" contains a movie sample with the phrase "I kick ass for the Lord", and the liner notes include a thank you to an e-zine titled "Headfucker Zine". He also felt that while some of the gory artwork was perhaps unnecessary, "it goes with the territory. If ya want to listen to goregrind, you're gonna see some gruesome stuff."

== Track listing ==
All tracks are written by Paul Green, except where noted.

No.	Title	Writer(s)	Length
1.	"Hammer Inflicted Brain Seizure and Hemorrhaging Cranial Cestation"		0:17
2.	"Curse or Blessing"	Chris Valentine	0:36
3.	"Malignant Cankerous Brain Feast and Tumorous Cerebral Beverage of the Cranium"		2:06
4.	"Blink"		0:06
5.	"Dumb"	Chris Valentine	1:23
6.	"Stenching Putrefaction of Crepitated Decomposing Carcassile and Eroded Internal Intestinal Tract and Organs"		1:28
7.	"Goreaphiler of the Flesh"		0:20
8.	"Life?"	Chris Valentine	0:31
9.	"Defleshed"		1:07
10.	"Cudgelate Mephistopheles Brutality"		0:13
11.	"Do It"	Chris Valentine	0:45
12.	"One Question and One Answer"		0:06
13.	"Festering Insalubrious Bowel Hemorrhaging of Gangrenous Pustulosus and Abdominal Abscess Discharge of the Intestinal Tract"		2:16
14.	"Holy Hypocrisy"	Chris Valentine	0:29
15.	"Cadaveric Necroticisum of Neuropathological Catatoniar and Pyrexia Malignant Growth of the Cerebrum"		2:17
16.	"Hillbilly Heaven"		0:20
17.	"Cerebral Turbulency"		1:09
18.	"Turn to Christ"		0:06
19.	"HC4JC"		0:44
20.	"Excoriating Karrionic Cankerous Emanation of Sludge and Ulcerated Flesh"		2:19
21.	"Pathetic"	Chris Valentine	0:15
22.	"Grotesque Mucopurulent Disgorgement"		2:05
23.	"Barnyard Grind"		0:27
24.	"Karrionic Hacktician"		2:17
25.	"Abolishment of Belial and All Impercating Creation"		0:19
26.	"Death Comes Quick"		0:08
27.	"CITDC"		3:15
Total length:			27:24

== Personnel ==
- Paul Green – Guitar, vocals, mastering
- Christopher Valentine – Drums, vocals
- Mark Hamilton – Bass
- Mike Keady – Banjo on "Hillbilly Heaven" and "Barnyard Grind"
- Bronwyn Henderson – Violin on "Hillbilly Heaven"
- Matt Hills – Recording, mixing
- Vomitorial Corpulence – Production
