= The Great Campaign of Sabotage =

Studio album by Overcome
- Released: February 1, 2011
- Genre: Christian metal, metalcore
- Length: 35:40
- Label: Facedown

Overcome chronology
More Than Death (2001)	The Great Campaign of Sabotage (2011)	No Reserves. No Retreats. No Regrets. (2013)

The Great Campaign of Sabotage is the fifth studio album from Overcome. Facedown Records released the album on February 1, 2011.

== Reception ==
Professional ratings
Review scores
Source	Rating
Cross Rhythms	6/10 squares
HM Magazine	5/5 stars
Indie Vision Music	3/5 stars

Writing a six out of ten review for Cross Rhythms, Peter John Willoughby says, "either you are going to enjoy the classic hardcore or rather you will be wanting to hear something fresh." Rob Shameless, awarding the album five stars at HM Magazine, states, "The Great Campaign of Sabotage is the perfect release to hold that title." Giving the album three stars from Indie Vision Music, Joshua Clark writes, "The Great Campaign Of Sabotage isn't exactly the ideal comeback album; they're some significant things that hold it down."

== Tracks ==
All tracks are written by Jason Stinson.

No.	Title	Length
1.	"Intro"	1:18
2.	"Reverence, Pt. II"	4:39
3.	"Body of Death"	2:26
4.	"Profession"	3:20
5.	"Alone In a Crowd" (Feat. Jarrod Norris)	3:15
6.	"The Breath of He Who Kills"	2:51
7.	"Seeker Sensitive"	2:22
8.	"Amnesty"	2:18
9.	"Clemency"	4:22
10.	"Lifting the Weak"	3:16
11.	"Campaign of Sabotage"	4:16
12.	"Outro"	1:17
Total length:		35:40
