= Under the Northern Sky =

Studio album by Immortal Souls
- Released: January 2001
- Recorded: February 26–29 2000, Studio Watercastle, Jyväskylä, Finland
- Genre: Melodic death metal
- Length: 39:36
- Label: Little Rose Productions
- Producer: Manu Lehtinen

Immortal Souls chronology
The Cleansing (2000)	Under the Northern Sky (2001)	Ice Upon the Night (2003)

Professional ratings
Review scores
Source	Rating
PowerMetal.de	(positive)

Under the Northern Sky is the first full-length album by the Finnish melodic death metal band Immortal Souls. This album was the last recording to be released by previous record label, Little Rose Productions in 2001.

== Recording ==
Under the Northern Sky was recorded during the same studio sessions as The Cleansing EP on February 26–29, 2000 at Studio Watercastle, Jyväskylä, Finland. The studiotechnics were handled Arttu Sarvanne, and the album was produced Manu Lehtinen, co-founder of Little Rose Productions and the band Deuteronomium.

According to the liner notes of the vocalist and bass player Aki Särkioja, during the recording of the album "the winter was extremely snowy and that boosted the lyrics more and more to the wintertale direction." "Frostmind" contains some of the fastest guitar riffs Immortal Souls have written and combine traditional metal to death metal. The album contains two instrumental songs: "Snowfalls" and "Metsäkukkia." The first is calm song that is characterized by folky clean guitar playing that creates a wintry atmosphere. "Metsäkukkia" is a speeded up melodic death metal adaptation of the traditional Finnish folk song. "Painthings" is about an artist's misery. "The Cold Northwind" was released on Little Rose Productions' compilation album titled The Metal Rose Collection.

Under the Northern Sky received a positive reception among fans and critics, although it remained rather unknown for years because Little Rose Productions did not have enough resources to promote the album widely. Under the Northern Sky was the band's last release on that label.

== Track listing ==
No.	Title	Length
1.	"Frostmind" (E.Särkioja / A.Särkioja)	3:34
2.	"The Cleansing" (A.Särkioja / E.Särkioja)	4:06
3.	"The Cold Northwind" (E.Särkioja)	3:35
4.	"Blue Flamed Fire" (E.Särkioja)	4:53
5.	"Snowfalls" (A.Särkioja / E.Särkioja)	2:13
6.	"Dark Night Under the Northern Sky" (E.Särkioja / A.Särkioja)	4:29
7.	"Love Demise" (J.Hakola / E.Särkioja)	3:53
8.	"Metsäkukkia"	2:09
9.	"Winterheart" (A.Särkioja)	3:26
10.	"Painthings" (A.Särkioja / E.Särkioja)	6:15

== Personnel ==
- Aki Särkioja – death growl, bass guitar
- Esa Särkioja – guitar
- Pete Loisa – guitar
- Jupe Hakola – drums
