= Indwelling (band) =

American Christian death metal band

- Origin: Chandler, Arizona, United States
- Genres: Christian death metal
- Years active: 2000-2004
- Labels: Facedown
- Past members: Jason Stinson; Thomas Washington; Ethan Pajak; BJ Ovsak; Jarrod Norris

Indwelling was a Christian technical death metal band from Arizona. The band formed soon after the demise of the Christian hardcore band, Overcome, which all members are affiliated with. The band disbanded probably around 2004, but in 2010 Overcome reunited and are still active.

== Members ==
Last known line-up

- Thomas Washington - vocals, (2000-2003) bass (2000-2004)
- Jason Stinson - guitar (2000-2004)
- Ethan Pajak - drums (2000-2004)
- Jarrod Norris - vocals (2003-2004)

Former

- BJ Ovsak - guitar (2000-2002)

Timeline

== Discography ==
Demo

- Demo 2001 (2001)

Studio albums

- And My Eye Shall Weep (2003, Facedown Records)
