= Ice Upon the Night =

Studio album by Immortal Souls
- Released: March 2003
- Recorded: November 2002, Sonic Pump Studios, Helsinki, Finland.
- Genre: Melodic death metal
- Length: 40:10
- Label: Fear Dark (EU); Facedown Records (US and Canada)
- Producer: Immortal Souls

Immortal Souls chronology
Under the Northern Sky (2001)	Ice Upon the Night (2003)	Once Upon a Time in the North (2005)

Ice Upon the Night is the second studio album by Finnish melodic death metal band Immortal Souls. It is Immortal Souls' first album released by the Dutch Fear Dark Records. It was released in March 2003.

== Recording ==
Ice Upon the Night was recorded in November 2002 at Sonic Pump Studios, Helsinki, Finland. The mixing and mastering was done by Nino Laurenne, and Mika Jussila mastered the album at Finnvox Studios, Helsinki. The album was produced by Immortal Souls.

Musically, the album continues on the band's melodic death metal approach as well as the wintry lyrical theme, although the overall tempo has gotten somewhat slower compared to the previous efforts. The session musician Kimmo Pulkkinen sings clean vocals on the song "You" as a duet with Aki Särkioja, in contrast to his death growl vocals. Pulkkinen also sings clean vocals on "Man of Sorrow."

Ice Upon the Night received a positive reception. For example, Mape Ollila, reviewer of Imperiumi.net the biggest metal music site in Finland, gave the album 8 out of 10 and wrote that the band was technically good and that there nothing wrong with the song material. Some fans, however, were not too excited about the slight metalcore influences on same songs, the overall calmer output, nor liked the less wintry cover art on the European release.

Ice Upon the Night was especially marketed to Benelux countries, Germany and Switzerland, and to the United States and Canada through Facedown Records that issued the album with a different, wintry cover.

== Track listing ==
No.	Title	Length
1.	"Everwinter"	3:36
2.	"Welcome to North"	3:58
3.	"Sacrifice"	3:31
4.	"Painbearer"	4:27
5.	"Edge of the Frost"	5:09
6.	"Cold Streets"	4:05
7.	"You"	4:24
8.	"Suicidalive"	4:17
9.	"Man of Sorrow"	6:36

== Personnel ==
- Aki Särkioja – death growl, bass guitar
- Esa Särkioja – guitar
- Pete Loisa – guitar
- Jupe Hakola – drums

=== Session musicians ===
- Kimmo Pulkkinen – clean vocals on "You" and "Man of Sorrow"
