= Voluntary Mortification =

American deathcore act

- Origin: Lansing, Michigan, United States
- Genres: Deathcore, death metal, Christian metal, brutal death metal
- Years active: 2021-present
- Labels: Rottweiler (2022-2024), Currently Independent
- Members: Conner Luttig; Jacob Kanclerz; Shane Lewis; Giulian Cardillo; Jon James
- Past members: Eric Farnum; Johnny Beriault; Cody Kessler; Matt Kunkel; Ernie Colwell; Dominic Cardillo
- Website: vmdeath.com

Voluntary Mortification is an American Christian deathcore band based in Lansing, Michigan, known for their "Catholic death metal" sound. The band's name came from "one of the core principles of Christian living: to voluntarily deny yourself on a daily basis, modeled after Christ and His example, is the path to redemption and salvation" and "the path of mortification, and the journey of life in general" which involves the "universal concept of suffering". It is not related to Christian death metal forerunners Mortification as none of the members had heard of the band previously.

Voluntary Mortification released their debut album Suffer to Rise on July 22, 2022, via Rottweiler Records. In late 2023, the band hired a new drummer, Giulian Cardillo, and his father Dominic on bass, who later became their sound technician when replaced by Jon James. A new single "Death Cult" was released on January 24, 2025. Per their social media pages, they are releasing EP Mortem Cultus on 9/26/2025.

== Musical style and influences ==
Voluntary Mortification and its material have been described as deathcore, death metal, Christian metal, and brutal death metal.

== Members ==
Current

- Conner Luttig – vocals (2021–present)
- Jacob Kanclerz – rhythm guitar (2021–present)
- Giulian Cardillo – drums (2023–present)
- Shane Lewis - lead guitar (2024–present)
- Jon James - bass (2024–present)

Former

- Eric Farnum – bass (2021–2023)
- Johnny Beriault – drums (2021–2023)
- Cody Kessler - guitar (2023)
- Matt Kunkel - guitar (2021-2023)
- Ernie Colwell - bass, guitar (2023-2024)
- Dominic Cardillo (2024) - Currently is the band's sound technician.

== Discography ==
- Suffer to Rise (2022)
- Mortem Cultus (2025)
