= Vomitorial Corpulence =

Australian grindcore band

- Origin: Melbourne, Australia
- Genres: Christian death metal; grindcore; goregrind
- Years active: 1993–2008, 2026–present
- Labels: Christ Core, Vomit Bucket, Rowe, Morbid
- Members: Paul Green
- Past members: Mark Hamilton; Alexander O'Neil; Ziggy Peters; Chris Valentine; Maria Green; Joshua Kellerman
- Website: Vomitorial Corpulence on Facebook

Vomitorial Corpulence is a Christian death metal and goregrind band from Melbourne, Australia. The band was started by Paul Green. The band's name is inspired by Revelation 3:15–16. Along with fellow Melbourne band Mortification, it was highly influential in the innovation of Christian death metal in the early 1990s.

== History ==
Vomitorial Corpulence started in 1992 as a vision of guitarist and vocalist Paul Green, but did not get moving until 1993, when he hired on bassist Mark Hamilton and drummer Alexander O'Neil, the latter of whom had formed the band Cryptal Darkness. In 1995, the band released 21 songs under the title Karrionic Hacktician as part of a compilation, The Extreme Truth – Australian Metal Compilation III, by Rowe Productions. O'Neil quit in 1995. The band at first tried recording using a drum machine but was dissatisfied with the results. Christopher Valentine then contacted the band and joined on as the new drummer. The band recorded and released their debut album, Skin Stripper, in 1998, before going on hiatus for the first time after first Valentine and then Hamilton left the band. Green also co-founded the deathgrind band Excarnated that same year. The music on Skin Stripper was compared to the early output of Carcass.

In December 2001, Green moved to Minnesota and married Maria, who became the band's bassist, and hired on Ziggy Peters and Johnathan Kellerman on vocals. The band signed to Morbid Records, which re-released Skin Stripper on 29 July 2002. The band alleges that they never received any sales money from this re-release. During this time, demo tracks were recorded for a new album, Insalubrious Collagery Of Pernicious Sepsis Infestation, scheduled to be released on 24 June 2002, later delayed to 2003. Alleging that Morbid was pressuring the band to abandon its Christian lyrical focus, the band left the label. Due to lack of a drummer, the band went on a second hiatus.

In August 2006, having moved back to Australia, Green started the band back up with Hamilton and Valentine. Karrionic Hacktician was released as a stand-alone recording with two demo tracks from 2002 included. Vomitorial Corpulence began recording new songs for a new album, Crucified, but the release was continually delayed as Green's work commitments meant he continually missed practice sessions. Valentine then reached out to four fellow Christian goregrind artists—Flactorophia, Demonic Dismemberment, Eternal Mystery, and Vomitous Discharge—who were collaborating on a split-album. Valentine helped finalize the album, invited a sixth artist, Engravor, to join the project, and financed most of the CD pressing. The final product, 6-Way Sin Decomposition Split, was released in 2007 on Christ Core Records and Vomit Bucket Recordings. After no further activity from its members, the band officially broke up in April 2008.

On June 12, 2026, Rottweiler Records announced the return of the band, with a new single, "Bestial Devourment". This was released in advance of a forthcoming album, Martyrdomical Symphonanthem, with Paul Green now as the sole member of the band.

== Band members ==
Current

- Paul Green – guitars, vocals, (1993–2008, 2026–present), bass, drum programming (2026–present)

=== Former ===
- Mark Hamilton – bass (1993–1999, 2006–2008)
- Chris Valentine – drums (1998, 2006–2008)
- Alexander O'Neil – drums (1993–1995)
- Ziggy Peters – vocals (2001–2003)
- Joshua Kellerman – vocals (2001–2003)
- Maria Green – bass (2001–2003)

Timeline

== Discography ==
Studio albums

- Skin Stripper (1998, Christ Core Records)
- Karrionic Hacktician (2006; as stand-alone release)
- Martyrdomical Symphonanthem (2026)

Compilations

- The Extreme Truth – Australian Metal Compilation III (1995) – a compilation with Callous, Sanhedrin, Screams of Chaos, and Desolate Eternity
- 6-Way Sin Decomposition (2007) – split with Flactorophia, Demonic Dismemberment, Vomitous Discharge, Eternal Mystery, and Engravor
