= Infernal Atrocity =

Studio album by Revulsed
- Released: October 31, 2015
- Recorded: 2013–2015
- Genres: Brutal death metal, technical death metal
- Length: 32:27
- Label: Permeated

Infernal Atrocity is the debut album by Australian death metal band Revulsed.

== Rankings ==
Revulsed was featured on No Clean Singing's list at #17, on Trevor Strnad of The Black Dahlia Murder's at #8 out of 100, and #9 out of 10 on It Djents.

== Critical reception ==
Infernal Atrocity received positive reviews from several heavy metal publications. Wouter Roemers of Transcending Obscurity praised the album's combination of traditional death metal songwriting and modern production, particularly its prominent bass guitar, drum sound and guitar solos. He identified "Transmutational Craniotomy" as one of the album's strongest tracks, although he considered the title track underdeveloped and criticised some of the album's conventional lyrical themes.

Writing for the Czech publication Fobia Zine, Prepil awarded the album 8 out of 10, highlighting its combination of brutality, technical musicianship and accessible songwriting. The reviewer also praised the production for maintaining instrumental clarity despite the music's heavy sound.

The French publication Thrashocore similarly praised the album's production, guitar work and balance between fast passages and slower sections. Its review noted influences from Suffocation, Deeds of Flesh and Defeated Sanity, while observing that the album did not significantly depart from established conventions of technical death metal.

In a retrospective assessment published in 2023, Angry Metal Guy contributor Kenstrosity described Infernal Atrocity as an overlooked debut, highlighting its guitar riffs and compositions while reviewing the band's follow-up album, Cerebral Contamination.

Professional ratings
Review scores
Source	Rating
Fobia Zine	8/10
Extreminal	10/10

The album received several positive reviews.

== Track listing ==
No.	Title	Length
1.	"Rapacious Engorgement"	3:57
2.	"Agonizing Putrid Self-Infliction"	3:50
3.	"Pestilential Articulation"	3:39
4.	"Imposed Cognitive Reconstruction"	4:00
5.	"Transmutational Crainiotomy"	3:54
6.	"Archetypal Cauterization"	4:13
7.	"Enticement to Carnivorous Impoverishment"	4:04
8.	"Celestial Perspicacity"	2:49
9.	"Infernal Atrocity"	2:01

== Personnel ==
Revulsed

- Konni Lühring - vocals
- Sheldon D'Costa - guitar, bass, mixing, mastering
- Jayson Sherlock - drums, mixing, mastering, layout

Other staff

- Yowie Smith - songwriting
- Pär Olofsson - artwork
- Jörg Uken - vocal recording
