= Anagogic Tyranny =

Studio album by Sympathy
- Released: November 11, 2008
- Genres: Technical death metal, Blackened death metal
- Label: Bombworks Records

Sympathy chronology
Abyssal Throne (2005)	Anagogic Tyranny (2008)

Professional ratings
Review scores
Source	Rating
Sounds of Dead	(10/10)
Lords of Metal	(83/100)

Anagogic Tyranny is the third studio album by the Canadian technical death metal band Sympathy, released on November 11, 2008, on Bombworks Records. The album features lead guitar work by the new member Jeff Lewis, and drumming work by Into Eternity member Jim Austin. The cover artwork was done by Jeff Arwadi of Soundmind Graphics and the band Kekal. In some interviews, Dharok stated the songs are character studies based on the book series Prince of Nothing.

== Track listing ==
No.	Title	Length
1.	"Insurrection"
2.	"And All Flesh"
3.	"On a Bloodied Cross"
4.	"Ours the Grave"
5.	"Perfection in Death"
6.	"Enslaved by Depravity"
7.	"Underworld"
8.	"Forgotten Temples"
9.	"The Iscariot Aspect"
10.	"Potter's Field"

== Musicians ==
- Dharok – rhythm guitars and vocals
- Jeff Lewis – rhythm and lead guitars
- Jim Austin – drums
