= Immortal Souls =

Finnish melodic death metal band

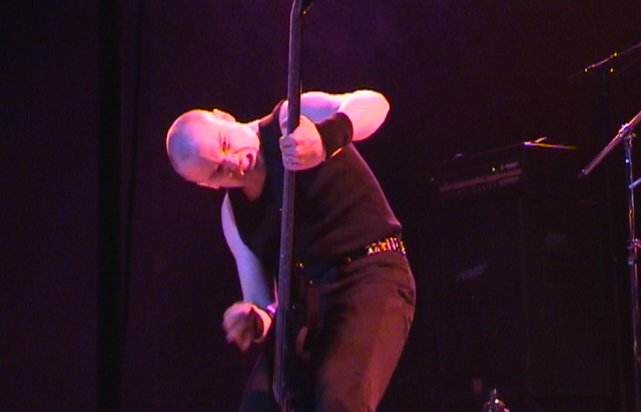
- A. Särkioja playing a bass guitar solo

Background information
- Origin: Kokkola, Finland
- Genres: Melodic death metal, doom metal (early)
- Years active: 1991-present
- Labels: Little Rose, Fear Dark, Dark Balance, Facedown, Rottweiler
- Members: Aki Särkioja; Esa Särkioja; Juha Kronqvist; Marko Pekkarinen
- Past members: Jupe Hakola; Antti Nykyri; Jukka-Pekka Koivisto; Pete Loisa
- Website: www.immortalsouls.com

Immortal Souls is a melodic death metal band from Kokkola, Finland, formed in 1991. They released a split album and their debut on Little Rose Productions in the late 1990s and early 2000s. In 2002, Immortal Souls signed with Dutch label Fear Dark, which released their second and third album as well as a compilation. They have performed at Tuska Open Air Metal Festival. Their style uses melodic guitar riffs, growls, and shouting. The album Wintereich was released in 2007 in Europe on Dark Balance and in the USA through Facedown Records.

== History ==
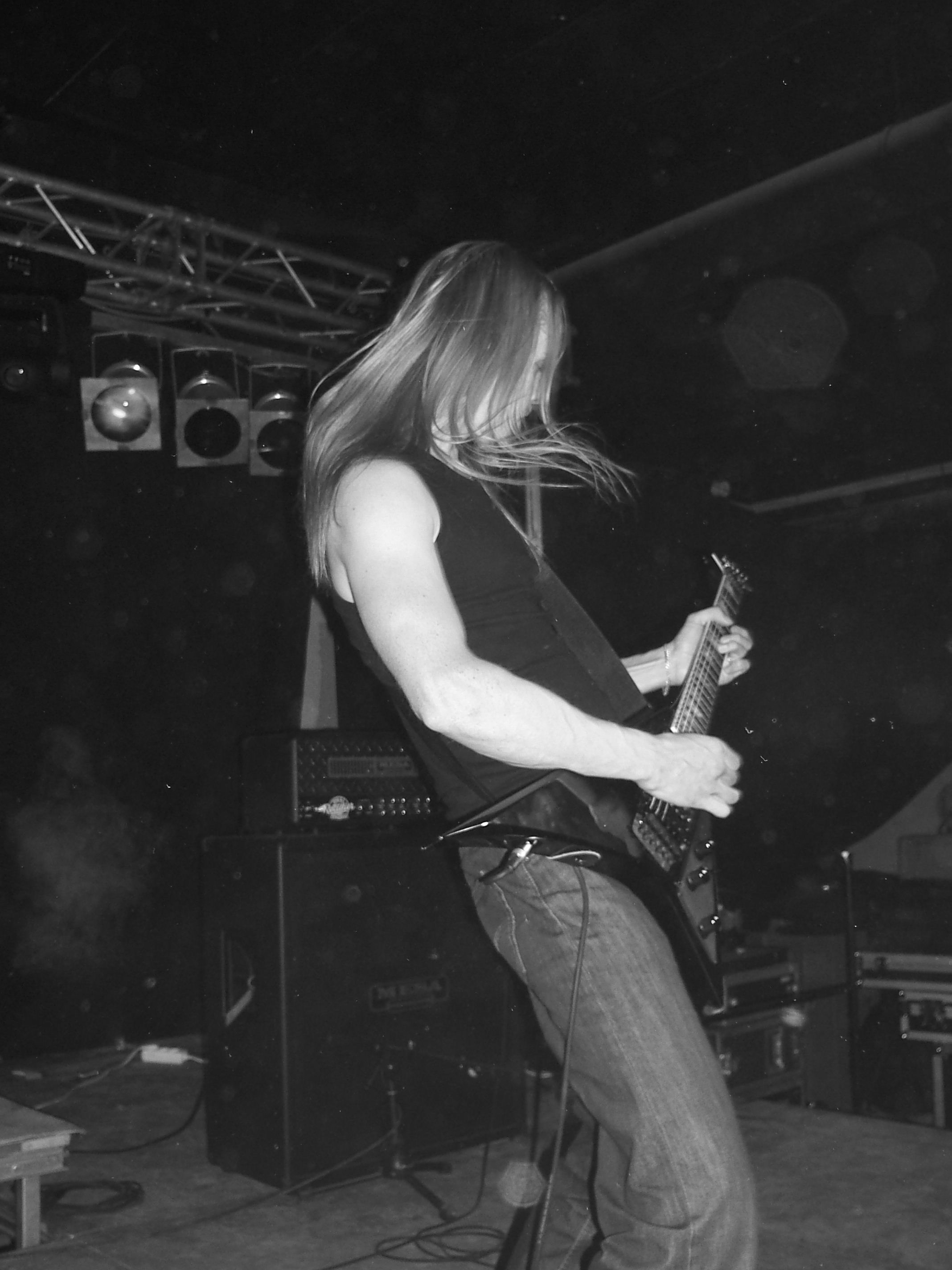
Esa Sarkioja (Metalfest 2007, Bad Hersfeld, Germany)

=== Beginning ===
In December 1991, Aki Särkioja (bass guitar, vocals) and Esa Särkioja (guitar) founded Immortal Souls. During the years 1992-1994 Immortal Souls recorded multiple unpublished demo tapes. Drummer Antti Nykyri joined the band in 1994. At the end of January 1995, the band recorded the six-song demo tape Immortal Souls, which featured the first appearance of the band's winter motifs, heavy metal style, and growled vocals. Nykyri left the band after one year due to other personal interests.

=== Doom metal period ===
During the years 1995-1996, Immortal Souls further developed their style. The band released Reflections of Doom in November 1996. New drummer Jupe Hakola joined later that year.

=== Record deal with Little Rose ===
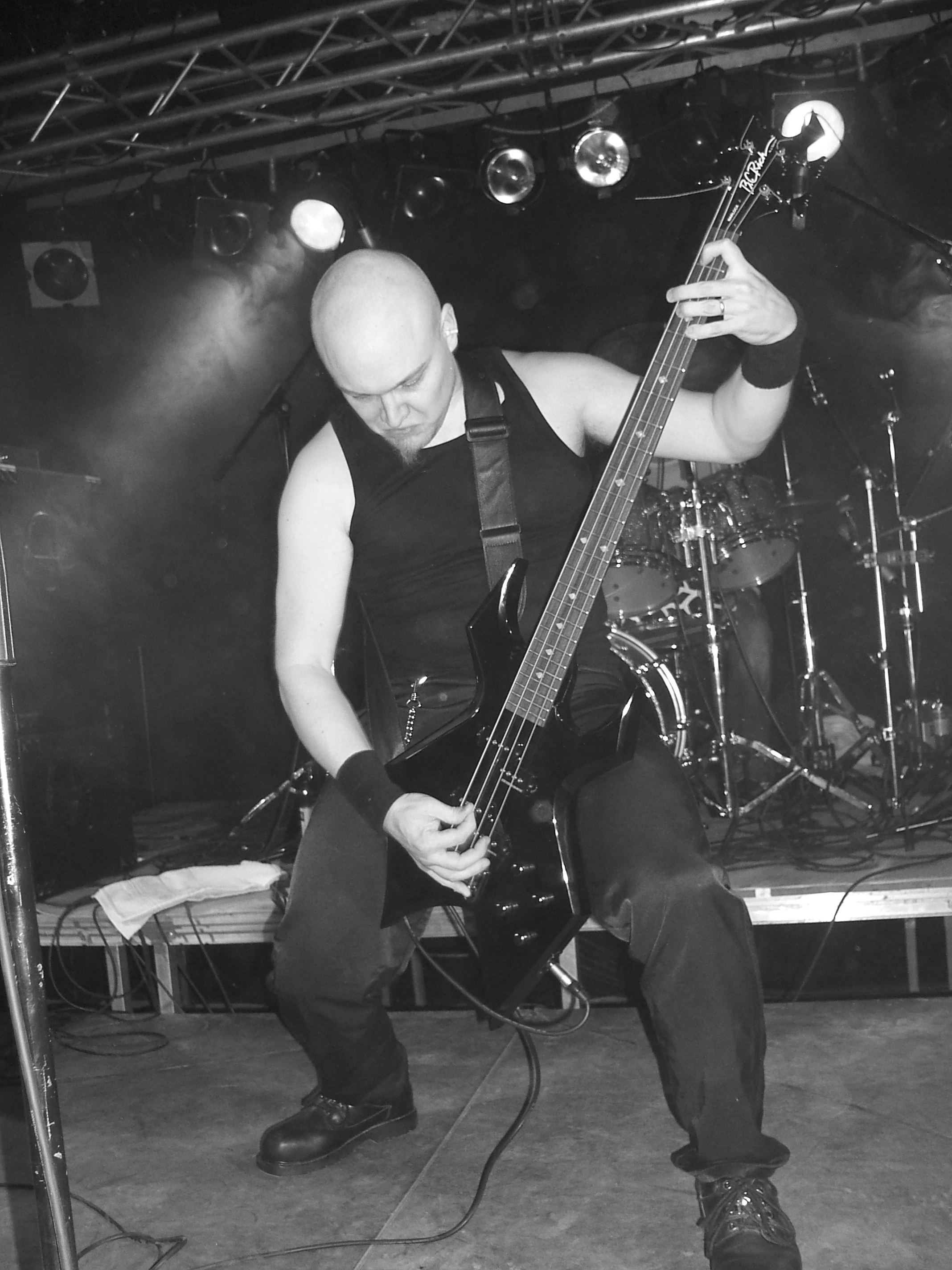
Bass guitarist-vocalist Aki Särkioja (Metalfest 2007, Bad Hersfeld)

Immortal Souls signed with Finnish record label Little Rose Productions. The band's style shifted from doom metal to a faster, melodic death metal.The Divine Wintertime EP, released in 1998, was published as a split-CD with Finnish metal band, Mordecai (Through the Woods, Towards the Dawn).

In 2000, Pete Loisa (rhythm guitar) joined the group as the band prepared to record their first full-length studio album. The Cleansing EP was released in February 2000. The band's debut full-length album, Under the Northern Sky, was released in 2001.

=== Record deal with Fear Dark ===
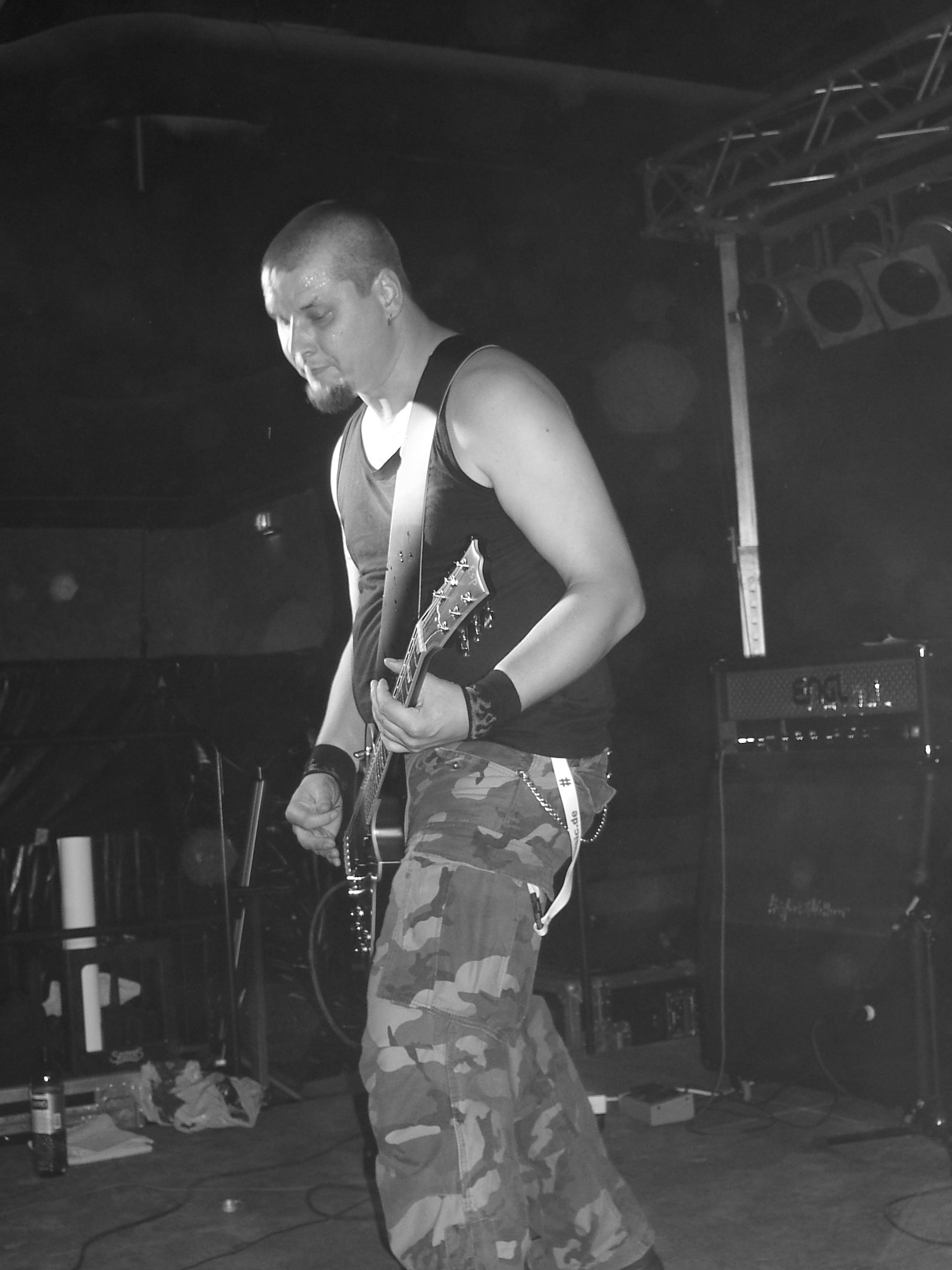
Pete Loisa (Metalfest 2007, Bad Hersfeld)

After Little Rose closed, Immortal Souls signed with Dutch label Fear Dark, which had worked with the band as a distributor. The band toured Central Europe and performed at the record label's annual Fear Dark Fest events and in the Tuska Open Air metal festival in Helsinki. Their album Ice Upon the Night was licensed to the US and Canada by the Facedown Records in the year 2004.

Drummer Jupe Hakola left the band and was replaced with Jukka-Pekka Koivisto. Following the band's tour of Germany and Switzerland, Koivisto left the band to record with the band Silent Voices. In early 2005, Juha Kronqvist joined Immortal Souls.

=== Wintereich and The Requiem for the Art of Death ===
In 2006, Immortal Souls announced on their website that they were working on the concept album Wintereich. The album was mastered in early 2007, and released by label Dark Balance on June 1, 2007. Like Ice Upon The Night in 2004, Wintereich was distributed by Facedown Records and released in the U.S. on August 21, 2007.

On May 22, it was announced that the band was working on the album The Requiem for the Art of Death. The album was released on October 7, 2011.

=== Record Deal With Rottwelier Records ===
On March 24, 2015, Immortal Souls released Wintermetal, via Rottweiler Records. In 2024, the band released Cold Sounds EP.

== Music ==
Immortal Souls' music is typically fast, technical melodic death metal of Scandinavian school. The lead guitar solos sets as a part of the accompaniment in both singing and virtuoso riffs and fast playing techniques. Riffs, tones and licks are melodic and stick to classical harmonies. The lead guitarist Esa Särkioja usually performs "darkly melodic riffage with power metal undercurrents".

== Members ==
Current members

- Aki Särkioja – vocals, bass guitar (1991–present)
- Esa Särkioja – lead guitar (1991–present)
- Marko Pekkarinen – rhythm guitar (2011–present)
- Juha Kronqvist – drums (2005–present)

Former members

- Antti Nykyri – drums (1994–1995)
- Jupe Hakola – drums (1996–2004)
- Jukka-Pekka Koivisto – drums (2005)
- Pete Loisa – rhythm guitar (2000–2010)

Timeline:

== Discography ==
Demos

- Immortal Souls (1995)
- Reflections of Doom (1997)

EPs

- Divine Wintertime/Through the Woods, Towards the Dawn (1998; Split EP with Mordecai)
- The Cleansing EP (2000)
- Cold Sounds (2024)

Compilations

- Once Upon a Time in the North (2005)

Studio albums

- Under the Northern Sky (2001)
- Ice Upon the Night (2003)
- Ice Upon the Night - US Version (2004)
- Wintereich (2007)
- IV: The Requiem for the Art of Death (2011)
- Wintermetal (2015)

Compilation appearances

- From Kaamos To Midnight Sun (1998)
- The Cold Northwind (2001)
- Metal + Hardcore Sampler CD (2003)
- Hard Music Sampler (2004)
- Sampler 2004 Facedown Distribution (2004)
- Extreme Music Sampler Volume 6 (2004)
- Something Worth Fighting For (2007)
- Facedown Records Sampler (2007)
- Thorns, Horns & Barbwire (2008)
- Repossession: A Christmas Album (2014)
- United We Skate Benefit Comp - Vol. 5 Metal (2015)
- Meltdown Echoes of Eternity (2016)
- The Bearded Dragon's Sampler: Third Times a Charm (2017)
- Extreme Music Sampler Volume 1
