= Revulsed =

Australian death metal band

- Origin: Melbourne, Australia
- Genres: Technical death metal, brutal death metal
- Years active: 2010–2026
- Labels: Permeated, Everlasting Spew
- Spinoff of: inExordium
- Members: Jayson Sherlock; Damien Mirklis
- Past members: Konstantin Lühring; Peter Ball; Sheldon D'Costa; Mark Smith

Revulsed was an Australian death metal band founded in 2010. Revulsed's debut album Infernal Atrocity was featured on Trevor Strnad of the Black Dahlia Murder's best albums of 2015 lists.

== History ==
After the demise of the Christian doom metal band Paramaecium (later inExordium), Jayson Sherlock and Sheldon D'Costa formed Revulsed in 2010. The band wrote their debut album for five years with Justin "Yowie" Smith formerly of fellow Australian Christian death metal band, Metanoia, still in search for a vocalist. For a brief time they had Peter Ball of Those Who Endure as their vocalist; it was not a good fit and Ball left. He was replaced by Konstantin Lühring of Defeated Sanity and they finished recording their debut album.

In October 2015 Infernal Atrocity was released via Permeated Records. Sherlock felt that "I always wanted to outdo those earlier albums of mine in terms of speed and overall brutality." Belgian music critic Wouter Roemers described it as "one of the better contemporary death metal albums... bland title notwithstanding, is traditional in spirit and approach, but contemporary and cutting-edge on all other fronts." Czech reviewer Prepil rated it as 8 out of 10 and explained "A jsem moc rád, že jsem díky náhodě na tuhle kapelu narazil a mám za to, že si určitě zaslouží i vaši pozornost... představuje album plné brutálního a přitom dynamického death metalu, jenž baví i při neustálém přehrávání." (English: "And I'm glad I by chance stumbled on this band, and I think that certainly deserves your attention... [It's] full of brutal, yet dynamic Death Metal, which entertains even during continuous playback.") Daniel F of Whiskey Soda noticed it is "ein musikalisch aussergewöhnlich vielseitiges, extrem hartes und inhaltlich erfreulich tiefgründiges Album." (English: "a musically extraordinarily versatile, extremely hard and content-wise enjoyably profound album.")

Mark Smith joined the band as their bass player after the recording of the album. Lühring left the band as he was unable to play locally. Damien Mirklis joined in January 2016 at the time of the announcement of Lühring's leaving.

The band planned on doing international shows in 2016. The band started to work on a second album that year with Mirklis and Smith being involved this time around. In 2017, the band released a live album, the first release to feature Mirklis and Smith, titled Live Atrocity – The Inception of Sufferance. In 2020, the band released their debut single, off their upcoming sophomore album, titled "Nefarious Devourment". On 20 November 2023, the band announced the departure of Smith and D'Costa, thanking them for their contributions and D'Costa for assisting with the sophomore album. On 15 December 2023, the band released their sophomore album, Cerebral Contamination through Everlasting Spew Records.

On July 29th 2026, Revulsed announced on their Facebook page that the band was coming to an end due to the lack of a permanent guitar or bass player.

== Members ==
Current

- Damien Mirklis - vocals (2016–present)
- Jayson Sherlock - drums (2010–present), bass (2010-2015) (formerly of Mortification, Horde, formerly of Deliverance, Altera Enigma)

Former

- Konstantin "Konni" Lühring – vocals (2014-2016) (formerly of Defeated Sanity, formerly of Despondency, formerly of Funeral Procession)
- Peter Ball - vocals (2013–2014) (Those Who Endure)
- Sheldon D'Costa - guitar (2010–2023) (InExordium, Incarnate, formerly of Incursion, formerly of Unforsaken)
- Mark Smith - bass (2015–2023) (Torture Kill, Severed Abortion)

Timeline

== Discography ==
Studio albums

- Infernal Atrocity (2015)
- Cerebral Contamination (2023)

Live albums

- Live Atrocity – The Inception of Sufferance (2017)

Singles

- "Nefarious Devourment" (2020)

Other songs

- "Hammer Smashed Face" - Cannibal Corpse (2018)
- "Into the Pit" - Testament (2018)
- "Living Monstrosity" - Death (2018)
- "With Their Flesh He’ll Create" - Gorguts (2019)
