= Antidemon =

Brazilian band

- Origin: São Paulo, Brazil
- Genres: Christian metal, death metal, Grindcore, Extreme metal
- Years active: 1994-present
- Labels: Rowe, Vision of God
- Members: Carlos Batista; Juliana Batista; Marcelo Alves
- Past members: Alexandre Cebotorov; Elke Garzoli; Kleber Albino; Sergio Gonçalves; Wanderlinden Oliveira; Maurício Cebalho; Luis Oliveira; Natã Fornazari; Diego Barrera
- Website: Antidemon on Facebook

Antidemon is a Christian extreme metal band from São Paulo, Brazil. The band was founded in 1994 by Carlos Batista. The band has been compared to death metal acts such as Morbid Angel and Suffocation.

== History ==
Antidemon was formed on January 12, 1994, with founding members Carlos Batista on vocals, Alexandre Cebotorov on bass, Kleber Albino on guitars, Sergio Gonçalves on guitars, and Elke Garzoli (Batista's wife) on drums. The band issued a demo later that year. After that, Cebotorov and Gonçalves left forcing Batista to become the band's bassist. The band did another demo in 1997 and a third in 1998. The band's debut album, Demonocídio was self-released in 1999. The band then split an EP with the band Zen Garden, entitled Barad. In March 2002, Antidemon began their first tour outside of Brazil, in Mexico, on the Demonocídio Mexican Tour. Their sophomore album, Anillo de fuego, which is Spanish for Ring of Fire came out in 2003.

In 2004, the band released a live album, titled Live in Palencia - Spain. The band would also play Destruction Fest that year. A year later, Albino and Garzoli left the band. Garzoli and Batista also got divorced. After their departure, Wanderlinden Oliveira briefly took over drums while Maurício Cebalho took over guitars. Oliveira was then replaced by Juliana Batista, Carlos' wife. The band released two more split EPs in 2006, the first with Empty Grave, and the second being a five-way-split with Against Death, Implement, Soterion, and Spiritual Live. In 2009, the band released a third album, Satanichaos, before Cebalho left the band. The band would go on to play Destruction Fest once again, alongside bands such as Ashen Mortality, A Hill to Die Upon, and Solace the Day.

In 2009, the band toured around Mexico, Bolivia, Brazil, Italy, England, Norway, Denmark, Spain, Portugal, and Sweden, performing shows with The Crucified, Theocracy, Narnia, Morgenroede, Prayer, Peerlees, Allos, Dynasty, Harpazzo, Posttrevor, Moriah, and Honoris Causa.

In 2012, they signed to Rowe Productions, a label owned by Steve Rowe of Mortification. and released their fourth album, Apocalypsenow, through Rowe. The band then signed to Vision of God Records in 2017. The band is preparing to record their fifth album and hope to finish by the end of 2018.

== Members ==
Current

- Antônio Carlos Batista Do Nascimento - Vocals, Bass (1994–present)
- Juliana Batista - Drums (2006–present)
- Marcelo Alves - Guitars (2016-2018, 2019–present)

Former

- Kleber Gonçalves Albino - Guitars (1994-2005)
- Sergio Kersey Gonçalves - Guitars (1994)
- Maurício Cebalho - Guitars (2006-2009)
- Luis Oliveira - Guitars (2010-2012, 2014 [Live])
- Natã Fornazari - Guitars (2012-2013)
- Diego Barrera - Guitars (2014-2016)
- Lucas Nakano - Guitars (2018-2019)
- Alexander Cebotorov - Bass (1994)
- Elke Garzoli - Drums (1994-2005)
- Wanderlinden Oliveira - Drums (2005-2006)

Live

- Marcelo "Soldado" Nejem - Guitars (2012-2014)

Timeline

== Discography ==
Studio albums

- Demonicídio (1999)
- Anillo de fuego (2003)
- Satanichaos (2009)
- Apocalypsenow (2012)
- Convergence (2024)

Splits

- Barad (2001)
- Antidemon / Empty Grave (2006)
- Underblood Fest Collection Vol. 1 (2006)
- Nordeste Tour Satanichaos (2010, w/ Amnistia & Dynamus)

Live

- Live in Palencia - Spain (2004)
- Anel de Demonicídio Live (2009)

Demo

- Antidemon (1994)
- Confinamento Eterno (1997)
- Antidemon 4 Anos (1998)

DVDs

- Extreme Fest (2005)
- Live in Ecuador, Colombia, Peru & Brazil (2009)
- Underblood Fest V (2010)
- The Mission (2013)
- Tormenterror (2017)

Compilation appearances

- Refúgio do Rock (1995)
- Lanceration Records (2000)
- Noise for Deaf Vol. III (2000)
- TRIP Magazine #91 (2001)
- Noise for Dead Vol. IV (2001)
- Brasil Collection (2001)

Music Videos

- "Welcome to Death" (2013)
