= Feast Eternal =

American Christian melodic death metal band

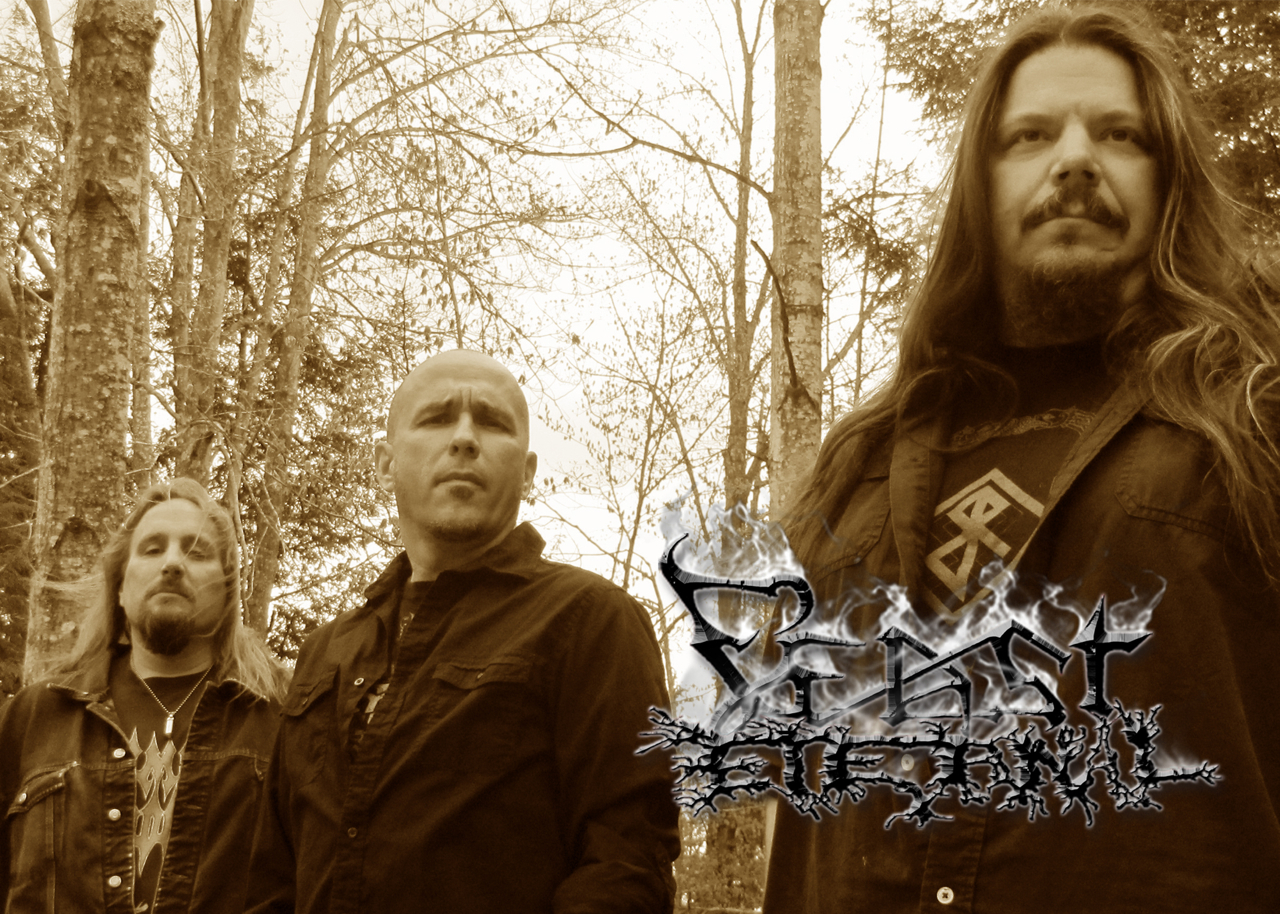
- Feast Eternal. From left to right: Matt Skrzypczak, Aaron Byrnes, and T.J. Humlinski.

Background information
- Origin: Traverse City, Michigan
- Genres: Melodic death metal; Extreme metal; Death metal
- Years active: 1992–present
- Label: Open Grave Records
- Members: T.J. Humlinski; Matt Skrzypczak
- Past members: John Greenman; Aaron Byrnes

Feast Eternal is an American Christian melodic death metal band from Traverse City, Michigan, United States. The band was originally formed in 1992. The band has released two full length studio albums and one EP to date. In 2006 Feast Eternal re-released their 1999, Prisons of Flesh, with 2 new bonus tracks. Their last release was a 4 song EP, Forward Through Blood, in 2013 which received a rating of 8.5 from the website PowerMetal.de (2014)

== Members ==
Current

- T.J. Humlinski – Vocals, guitar (1992–present)
- Matt Skrzypczak – Drums (1993–present)

Former

- Aaron Byrnes – Guitar, bass guitar, backing vocals (2011-2014)
- John Greenman - Bass guitar (1992-1996), rhythm guitar (1997-2000)
- Josh Potrafka - Bass guitar (1997-2000)

== Discography ==
"The Peril of Flesh"
"The Peril of Flesh" is the third song from "Forward Through Blood" released in 2013.

- Prisons of Flesh (1999)
- With Fire (2007)
- Prisons of Flesh (re-release with two bonus songs) (2006)
- Forward Through Blood (2013)
