= Sympathy (band) =

Canadian blackened death metal band

Background information
- Origin: Caronport, Saskatchewan, Canada
- Genres: Blackened death metal, technical death metal, death metal, black metal
- Years active: 1991–present
- Labels: Bombworks, Fear Dark, Monumentum Scandinavia
- Members: Dharok; Jeff Lewis; Jim Austin
- Website: Sympathy's MySpace page

Sympathy is a blackened death metal band from Canada, formed in 1991. Sympathy got some notable attention in the Benelux, Germany and Switzerland as those are the countries where their previous label Fear Dark is usually marketing its bands. The band is known for its professional musicianship. Sympathy's albums are distributed in the United States, Europe and Canada through Displeased Records, Deadsun Records, Megarock Records, Facedown Records, and The Omega Distribution. Their lyrical themes tend to revolve around subjects such as theology, philosophy, and death. They have released three albums, Invocation, Arcane Path, and an EP titled Abyssal Throne. On February 19, 2008, the band was signed to Bombworks Records. The third album titled Anagogic Tyranny was released on November 11, 2008. The band remained a one-man project from 1995, until 2004.

== Biography ==
Sympathy started out as a five-piece thrash metal band in vein of Celtic Frost and produced its first demo in 1991. One by one the other musicians left Sympathy and eventually it ended up being Dharok's solo project. During the years 1993–1997, the musical style took a more technical death metal direction, and Dharok released the recordings Arrogance and Ignorance (1993), Age of Darkness (1995), and Realms of Chaos (1996).

The band's influences include: Suffocation, Morbid Angel, Death, Emperor, Kreator, Cannibal Corpse, and Dimmu Borgir. In 2001, Sympathy signed a record deal with the Dutch extreme metal label Fear Dark and soon recorded its first commercially available studio album titled Invocation. The album received positive feedback in underground metal circles, magazines such as BW & BK, and was mentioned in Metal Maniacs magazine as one of the "reader's albums of the year for 2002".

On the following releases, Tim Roth of Into Eternity, as well as other members from that particular band, and other bands began to fill in the spot. In 2004, Sympathy released its second album titled Arcane Path which took a more technical blackened death metal direction and showcased a more polished production. Arcane Path featured frontcover artwork as well as a new logo design by the reputive Belgian (Flemish) artist Kris Verwimp. The album was well received and brought them more exposure. The album was compared to Nile, being primarily a brutal death metal album.

In late 2005, Sympathy released an EP titled Abyssal Throne which featured two re-recorded songs from Invocation, two new songs and a cover of Suffocation's "Torn into Enthrallment". Abyssal Throne was released on the Norwegian label Momentum Scandinavia, and the packaging artwork was done by the Swedish graphic designer Samuel Durling. Later in 2005, a fellow Canadian, Jeff Lewis, known from his work in Australian band Mortification and his solo project Abolishment of Hate, would join forces with Sympathy, as would Jim Austin, formerly of Into Eternity.

On February 19, 2008, the band was signed to Bombworks Records. The third album titled Anagogic Tyranny was released November 11, 2008. Sounds of Dead gave it 10 out of 10 points and Lords of Metal gave it 83 out of 100. Tracks from the album were included on the sampler CD's of such magazines as Metal Maniacs and Terrorizer.

In April 2009, the band announced that they have written 12 new songs and are currently recording them, the fourth Sympathy album is tentatively entitled Beast.

== Band members ==
- Derek "Dharok" James From – vocals, rhythm guitars (1991–present)
- Jeff Lewis – lead and rhythm guitars (formerly of Mortification, Abolishment of Hate, formerly of Incursion) (2005–present)
- Jim Austin – drums (formerly of Into Eternity) (2005–present)

== Discography ==
Studio albums

- Arrogance and Ignorance (1993)
- Age of Darkness (1995)
- Invocation (2002)
- Arcane Path (2004)
- Anagogic Tyranny (2008)

Demos

- Covenant (1991)
- Realms of Chaos (1996)

EPs

- Abyssal Throne (2005)
