= Sacrificium =

German Christian death metal band

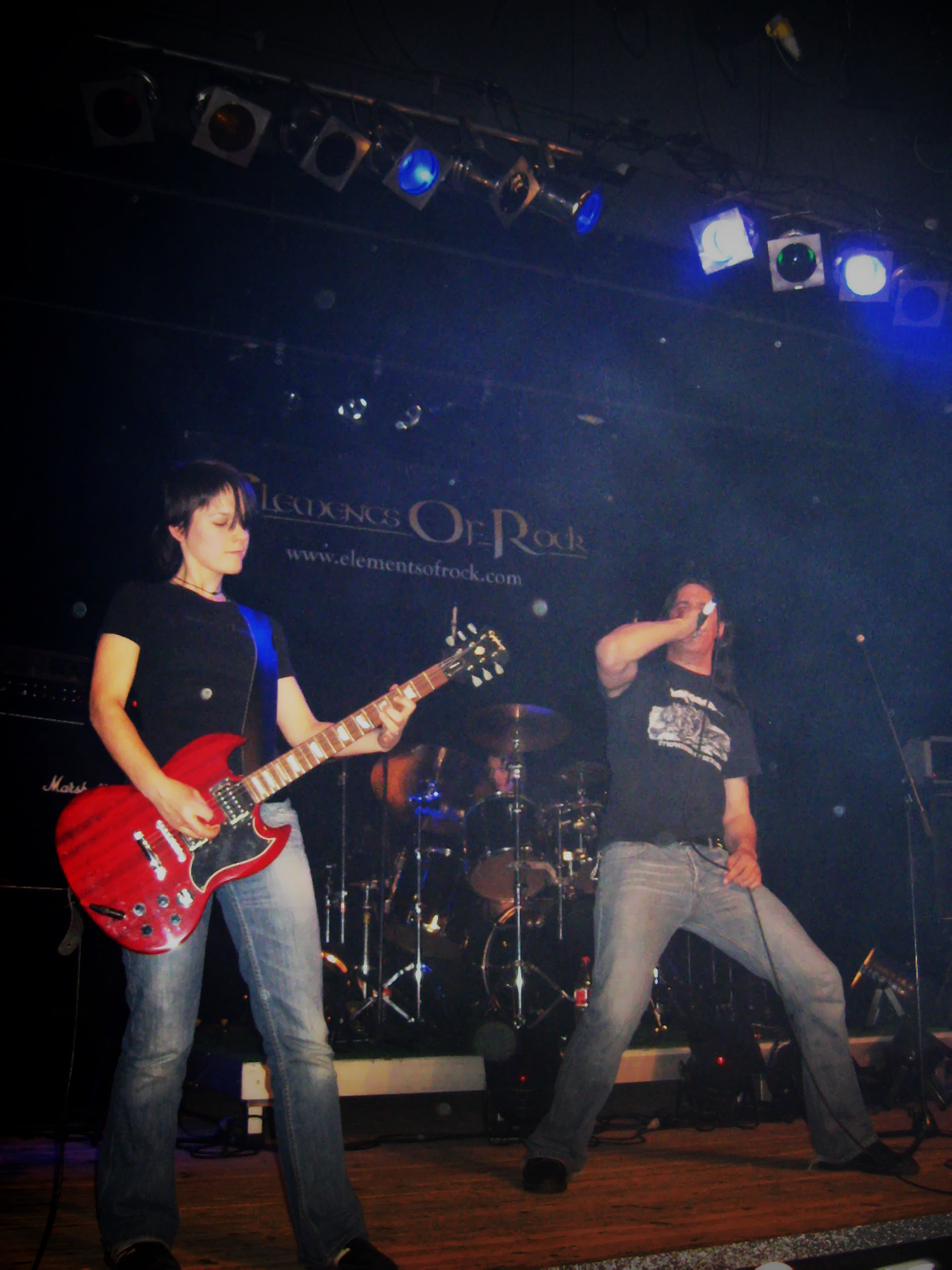
- Sacrificium at Elements of Rock, Switzerland in 2007

Background information
- Origin: Stuttgart, Germany
- Genre: Death metal
- Years active: 1993–present
- Labels: Whirlwind Records, Black Lotus Records, Nordic Mission
- Members: Claudio Enzler; Ulrike Uhlmann; Wolfgang Nillies; Frederik Berger; Martin Epp
- Past members: Sebastian Wagner; Markus Hauth; Roman Wagner; Manuel Iwansky; Manuel Kerkow; Samuel Herbrich; Thorsten Brandt; Matthias Brandt; Mario Henning; Daniel Maucher; Oliver Tesch

Sacrificium is a Christian death metal band from Stuttgart, Germany, formed in 1993. The band broke through in the metal scene with the 2002 album Cold Black Piece of Flesh. The second album, Escaping the Stupor, was released on Black Lotus Records. Their music combines melodic passages with old-school death metal, and their lyrics deal with personal experiences and Christian views.

== Biography ==
Sacrificium has its roots in pop rock-oriented band Hardway, formed by Sebastian Wagner and Oliver Tesch. In 1991, session drummer Markus Hauth took the band in a hard rock direction. In 1992, Hardway performed at the Steiger 14 club in Amsterdam, the Netherlands. The band name changed to Corpus Christi (not to be confused with Corpus Christi from Ohio) in 1993 and they played thrash metal and then death metal. In 1994, after recording a demo, the name was changed to Sacrificium.

After a line up changes in 1996, Sacrificium recorded its second demo and, in 1998, another demo, titled Mortal Fear, was released. Although the demos were well-received, vocalist Roman Wagner left Sacrificium in 2000. After that, the band played concerts with Extol, Dismember, Unleashed, The Black Dahlia Murder or My Darkest Hate. Second guitarist Claudio Enzler started singing, and Ulrike Uhlmann became the guitarist.

In 2002, Sacrificium signed to Whirlwind Records, who published the band's debut Cold Black Piece of Flesh. The album received positive reviews. Rock Hard gave it 7.5/10 in its February 2004 issue. They toured Europe with the band Brain[Faq].

On November 28, 2005, Sacrificium released its second album, Escaping the Stupor, on Greek label Black Lotus Records. The album features guest performances by Karl Walfridsson of Pantokrator and Simon Rosén of Crimson Moonlight. Escaping the Stupor was well-received. Rock Hard gave it 7.5/10, Legacy 10/15 and Metalnews.de 6/7.

The band was working on new material and updating its Facebook bulletin with pre-production demo takes and news.

Founding guitarist Oliver Tesch left the band in 2012, replaced with Wolfgang Nillies.

Guitarist Matthias Brandt and bass player Thorsten Brandt left the band on October 30, 2015 and were replaced with Fred Berger and former member Ulrike Uhlmann.

On January 6, 2019, drummer Mario Henning left the band. They cancelled their Mexican tour, which would have been in April 2019. At the same time, the band announced the EP The Avowal of the Centurion in early 2019, and a full-length record in 2020. On March 16, 2019, former bassist Thorsten Brandt took over on drums. On March 18, the band revealed that The Avowals of the Centurion would be released via Nordic Mission on April 19, 2019.

== Discography ==
Studio albums

- Cold Black Piece of Flesh (2002)
- Escaping the Stupor (2005)
- Prey for Your Gods (2013)
- Oblivion (2023)

== Members ==
Current members

- Claudio Enzler – vocals (2000–present), guitar (1994–2000)
- Wolfgang Nillies – guitars (2012–present)
- Frederik “Fred” Berger – guitars (2017–present)
- Ulrike Uhlmann – bass (2017–present), guitars (1993–2010)
- Martin Epp – drums (2021–present)

Former members

- Oliver Tesch – guitars (1991–2012)
- Sebastian Wagner – bass, vocals (1991–1993)
- Markus Hauth – drums (1991–1995)
- Roman Wagner – vocals (1993–2000)
- Manuel Iwansky – bass (1993–1997)
- Manuel Kerkow – bass (1997)
- Samuel Herbrich – bass (1997–2008)
- Thorsten Brandt – drums (2019–2021), bass (2008–2017)
- Matthias Brandt – guitars (2010–2015)
- Daniel Maucher – guitars (2015–2017)
- Mario Henning – drums (1995–2019)

Timeline
