= Sacrament (band) =

American Christian metal band

- Origin: Philadelphia, and Folcroft, Pennsylvania, U.S.
- Genres: Christian metal, progressive metal, thrash metal
- Years active: 1989–1994
- Label: R.E.X.
- Past members: Robert Wolfe; Mike DiDonato; Erik Ney; Paul Graham; Brian Toy; Mike Torone

Sacrament was a Christian progressive thrash metal band from Philadelphia, Pennsylvania, United States, formed in 1989. Their music was known for its evangelistic lyrics, and they often played to secular audiences. Sacrament is one of the pioneers of Christian thrash metal, along with Living Sacrifice. When they broke up in 1994, members DiDonato and Ney formed Fountain of Tears with members of Believer.

In April 2021, Paul Graham and Mike Torone, two original members of Sacrament, started a new band, Testimony of Apocalypse. The lineup includes Paul Graham (drums), Mike Torone (vocals) and Nick Pacitti (guitars, bass, keyboards). Their first single Redemption was released September 2021 by The Charon Collective record label.

== Members ==
Last Known Line-up

- Robert Wolfe – vocals
- Mike DiDonato – guitars
- Erik Ney – bass guitar
- Paul Graham – drums
- Brian Toy – guitar

Former

- Mike Torone – vocals

== Discography ==
Studio albums

- Testimony of Apocalypse (1989, R.E.X.)
- Haunts of Violence (1992, R.E.X.)

EPs

- Presumed Dead (1989)
