= Blood Covenant (band) =

Indian heavy metal band

- Origin: Chennai, Tamil Nadu, India
- Genres: Christian metal, thrash metal, death metal, unblack metal
- Years active: 2005 – present
- Label: Independent Records
- Members: Eddie Prithviraj; Sibi Boycott Walter; Ronald Nathanael; Brijesh Sereno
- Past members: Tim Elliot; David Livingstone; Nitin Krishnamurthy

Blood Covenant is an Indian heavy metal band, considered the pioneers of metal in South India from Chennai, formed in 2005.

== History ==
The band was a major force in the death metal, thrash metal and christian metal genres in India starting from the late 1990s because of its vocalist Eddie's earlier bands like Bonesaw. Their later experiments are influenced by black metal. Currently the band's sound is a mix of Swedish death metal and Brazilian thrash metal forming into Blood Covenant's own thrash/death style. The band's current line up consists of vocalist Eddie Prithviraj, guitarist Ronald Nathanael, bassist Sibi Boycott Walter and drummer Brijesh Sereno.

Blood Covenant has toured all major Indian cities doing live shows. Their most active years were from 2005 to 2009. Since 2010 the band has been involved in projects with French and Swedish metal artists to work on an album. The band's influences include Mortification, Living Sacrifice, Extol, Crimson Moonlight, Horde, Frost Like Ashes, and Antestor. All the lyrical content is based on the New Testament of the Bible.

== Band members ==
- Eddie (Ed Bull) Prithviraj - Vocals
- Sibi Boycott (Thorn) Walter - Bass
- Ronald (Slaughter) Nathanael - Guitars, Backing vocals
- Brijesh (Hurricane) Sereno, - Drums

== See also ==
- Indian rock
- Kryptos (band)
- Bhayanak Maut
- Nicotine (band)
- Inner Sanctum (band)
- Demonic Resurrection
