= Opprobrium (band) =

American death metal band

- Also known as: Incubus (1986–1991)
- Origin: Metairie, Louisiana, U.S.
- Genres: Death metal, thrash metal, death-thrash
- Years active: 1986–1991; 1999–present
- Labels: Metal Mind, Nuclear Blast, Relapse
- Members: Francis M. Howard; Scot W. Latour; Moyses M. Howard
- Past members: Mark Lavenia; Luiz Carlos; André Luiz; Pete Slate

Opprobrium (formerly Incubus) is an American death/thrash band from Metairie, Louisiana, United States. The band was founded in 1986 by brothers Francis and Moyses Howard as Incubus. The Howards are natives of Rio de Janeiro who emigrated to New Orleans to found the band. The original incarnation featured bassist/lead vocalist Scot Latour, and the trio's 1987 demo, Supernatural Death, secured them a deal with Brutal Records. Their official debut, Serpent Temptation, was released in 1988. Latour departed soon afterwards, leaving Francis to take over vocals. Incubus signed with Nuclear Blast in 1990 and released their follow-up Beyond the Unknown. Recording with Francis on bass, Incubus recruited Mark Lavenia as the full-time bassist. Shortly thereafter, in 1991, Incubus disbanded, then reformed after a ten-year break, and changed their name to avoid confusion with rock band Incubus from California. They released their album Discerning Forces on Nuclear Blast Records in 2000.

The band's style is a death/thrash metal crossover, combined with lyrics about death, violence and occasionally Christian references. Francis Howard and Scot Latour sang background vocals on the song "Stronger Than Hate", the third track on the Sepultura album Beneath the Remains. Francis Howard guested session vocals on two Cannibal Corpse songs on the album Eaten Back to Life. The band is signed to Metal Mind Productions. On July 21, 2009, the band announced that original bassist Scot W. Latour had rejoined the band after 20 years. In 2017, it was thought that Metallica stole riffs from the band when they were Incubus. It was later discovered that this was untrue, but it brought attention to the band. The band did not agree with the claims of plagiarism; only the record label released a statement about these claims.

== Members ==
Current members

- Francis M. Howard - guitar, vocals (1986–present) bass (1989–1990, 2000–2009, 2011–present)
- Moyses M. Howard - drums (1986–present)

Past members

- Scot W. Latour - bass, vocals (1986–1989, 2009–2011)
- Mark Lavenia - bass, vocals (1990–1992)
- Pete Slate - guitar (1991)
- Luiz Carlos - guitar (1997–2000)
- André Luiz - bass (1992–2000)

Timeline

== Discography ==
- Serpent Temptation (Brutal Records, 1988)
- Beyond the Unknown (Nuclear Blast, 1990)
- Discerning Forces (Nuclear Blast, 2000)
- Mandatory Evac (Metal Mind Productions, 2008)
- The Fallen Entities (High Roller Records, 2019)
