= Live – På ren svenska =

Live - På ren svenska

Live album by Jerusalem
- Released: 1998
- Recorded: April – May 1997
- Venue: Oslo; Arendal; Vennesla; Jönköping; Värnamo
- Genre: Hard rock, rock
- Length: 136:00
- Label: Fruit Records, MEP

Jerusalem chronology
Volüm Fyra (R.A.D.) (1997)	Live - På ren svenska (1998)	Tretti (2006)

Professional ratings
Review scores
Source	Rating
HM	Not rated

Live – På ren svenska is the second live album, and the fourteenth album overall, by the Swedish hard rock band Jerusalem, released in 1999. It was Jerusalem's first Swedish-only album. It was recorded on the 1997 "Korståget" tour in Scandinavia, the first tour with this line-up since 1981.

== Track listing ==
All songs by Ulf Christiansson, except for "Dagarna går" by Dan Tibell.

Disc one

1. "Introduktion"
2. "Du kommer först"
3. "Mossberg... hej... hej"
4. "Så va' de' då"
5. "Krigsman"
6. "It's mad"
7. "Dagarna går"
8. "Var du än är"
9. "Pappa vem har gjort"
10. "Jag längtar efter mer av dej"
11. "Hög tid"
12. "Sodom"

Track 1 from Volym 2
Tracks 2, 4 & 8 from Volym Tre
Tracks 5, 6 & 12 from Krigsman
Tracks 7, 9 & 11 from Jerusalem
Track 10 previously unreleased

Disc two

1. "Moderne man"
2. "Neutral"
3. "Jag vill ge dig en blomma"
4. "Uffes story..."
5. "Vänd om"
6. "Flugit genom rymden"
7. Trumdrag ifrån Klas
8. "Ständig förändring"
9. "Noa"
10. "Ajöss med dej värld"
11. "Kom till mej"

Tracks 1 & 8 from Krigsman
Tracks 2, 9 & 11 from Jerusalem
Track 3 & 10 from Volym 2
Track 5 from Volüm Fyra
Track 6 from Volym Tre

== Personnel ==
- Ulf Christiansson - lead vocals, guitar
- Anders Mossberg - bass guitar, vocals
- Dan Tibell - keyboards
- Klas Anderhell - drums, vocals
