= Jerusalem (Swedish band) =

Swedish Christian rock band

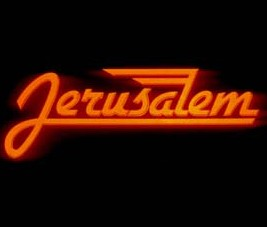
- Band logo

Background information
- Origin: Gothenburg, Sweden
- Genres: Christian rock, Christian metal, Contemporary Christian music (broadly)
- Years active: 1975–present
- Members: Ulf Christiansson; Anders Mossberg; Dan Tibell; Klas Anderhell; Peter Carlsohn; Reidar I. Paulsen; Michael Ulvsgärd
- Past members: Bertil Sörensson; Danne Gansmoe
- Website: www.jerusalem.se

Jerusalem has been described as one of the pioneers of Christian rock in Sweden and an early contributor to the development of Christian hard rock and metal in Europe. The Swedish pop culture magazine OKEJ described the band in 1983 as world-class rock music, and reported two years later that Jerusalem had grown bigger abroad than at home. ABBA's Björn Ulvaeus was reported to have raised an eyebrow — in a good way — at Jerusalem's fresh approach. Their 1982 music video for "It's Mad," from the album Warrior, was described by Billboard as the first "gospel rock" video on MTV, airing ahead of similar videos by DeGarmo & Key and Stryper.

Jerusalem is a Swedish Christian rock and Christian metal band exemplary of an early hard rock and heavy metal band to discuss Christianity and religious faith in its lyrics. Ulf Christiansson formed the group in 1975 with an expressly evangelistic purpose, with lyrics describing the band's relationship to God in an ordinary, yet radical, way. Their concerts have been described as a series of revival meetings which often included altar calls and occasionally exorcisms. Christiansson himself described this in 1992 as "doing warfare with the music and getting demons out of young people."

In 1994, Jerusalem released Prophet, recorded, according to a contemporary review, from twelve hours of unscripted studio improvisation with not a single song written in advance; the same review called it possibly the best Jerusalem album ever made and predicted its reinvented sound would resonate far beyond the Christian music scene.

== Musical career ==
=== Formation and debut (1970–1979) ===
Before forming Jerusalem, Ulf Christiansson had played in various secular orchestras until he was 21. Following a period of dissatisfaction with life, he connected with the American "Jesus people" movement and became a Christian, after which he abandoned music entirely, remaining musically silent for three years before the idea for Jerusalem was born. Christiansson became a Christian in Gothenburg in 1970, five years before forming Jerusalem. Christiansson formed Jerusalem in 1975 with an expressly evangelistic purpose. The band originally comprised five members: alongside Christiansson, Bertil Sörensson played bass, Danne Gansmoe drums, Dan Tibell organ, and Evert Edin piano.

In 1977, the band appeared on Sveriges Radio's P3 programme Till glädje ("For Joy"), which broadcast contemporary Christian music during prime listening hours, after producer Bosse Lindqvist invited the band to record three songs for the broadcaster. The appearance provoked strong reactions among listeners, both supportive and critical; Christiansson later recalled it simply as "for and against." Shortly afterwards, the band was approached by record label Prim, by recommendation of vocalist Ingmar Johansson. Christiansson has said the band deliberately avoided approaching labels themselves, choosing instead to wait to be contacted in the belief this reflected God's will; three labels called within a week, and the band signed with Prim, the first to call.

The band's eponymous debut album, Jerusalem, released in 1978, became an instant hit among listeners, and within the first six months the record sold 20,000 copies, which was unheard of within the European Christian rock genre. The debut album received a favourable review in the Swedish Christian newspaper Dagen. Critic Conny Söder praised Prim's decision to release it as a bold move deserving applause, judging the band fully comparable in quality to its secular Swedish counterparts and singling out Christiansson as an above-average rock vocalist. Söder also noted that the album was recorded with almost no overdubbing, so that the band sounded the same live as on record, unusual for the period.

The band's early success was notable because Christian rock was still a developing genre in Europe, and Jerusalem's combination of hard rock instrumentation and explicitly Christian lyrics was controversial among some church audiences. The band made its Swedish television debut on 3 March 1979 on the programme Mellan himmel och jord ("Between Heaven and Earth"), broadcast from Falun, and was described at the time as a pioneer of this new, Christian-rock sound in Sweden.

A 1979 profile in Dagen described Jerusalem as formed to capture young people's attention and deliver a Christian message amid renewed cultural interest in rock music in Sweden, noting the band's recent debut LP and an upcoming concert at Polhemsskolan in Gävle on 27 April 1979. The band gained broad acceptance in the late 1970s, concurring alongside the early development of contemporary Christian music.

=== Volym 2 and international expansion (1980–1981) ===
Ahead of the release of Volym 2 in 1980, Christiansson explained the reasoning behind the band's name, describing it as meant to reflect both the music and its forward-looking direction, while Jerusalem — like the message of Jesus Christ — was meant to remain at the centre of attention. At the time, he worked as a postman and was raising three children, and the band combined music-making with day jobs and family life; even ABBA's Björn Ulvaeus was reported to have spoken positively about the band's fresh approach.

The album was recorded at the Prim studio, with the band deliberately avoiding extra musicians or studio embellishments so as to sound the same on record as in concert. According to the article, Jerusalem had performed 84 shows the previous year, and although the members loved playing, they found it exhausting to balance touring with full-time work, hoping growing interest from the United States and several European countries might eventually let them turn professional.

A 2018 review of a remastered reissue in Heaven's Metal magazine described Volym 2 as more theatrical and progressive than the band's debut, drawing comparisons to Deep Purple's organ-driven style and Queen's theatrical flair. The reviewer singled out "Gethsemane," which told the story of Christ's betrayal and crucifixion "in a way that had not really been done previously," as foreshadowing the musical direction the band would take on Warrior the following year. The same reissue restored two tracks, "Love Song" and "Dialogue (Between One Person)," that had been omitted from an earlier Fruit Records CD release. The album also marked the band's first lineup change, with Anders Mossberg joining on bass and Klas Anderhell on drums.

Americans attending the Christian Greenbelt festival in England, where Jerusalem participated during the summer of 1980, brought the record to the United States. Glenn Kaiser, who led the Resurrection Band–a prominent Christian rock band in the United States–gave the record to Pat Boone, who owned Lamb & Lion Records, the label that subsequently released Jerusalem's records in the U.S. and Canada.

On 27 December 1981, Swedish public broadcaster SVT aired a television special about the band, Rock för Gud ("Rock for God"), filmed live in Växjö, as part of the Söndagskväll strand. Jerusalem also appeared on West German television, performing on the ZDF concert programme Rockpop in Concert (recorded in Dortmund on 19 December 1981 and broadcast on 30 January 1982), alongside German band Spliff.

Jerusalem's English-language releases helped expand the band's international audience. The band later toured in the United States, where they gained exposure within the American Christian rock scene.

In January 1981, Swedish Christian newspaper Dagen reported on the band's growing international profile. According to the article, Jerusalem had performed in France, Belgium, Germany, and England over the preceding year, and the week before publication part of a concert by the band, filmed at a discotheque in Berlin, had been broadcast on German television. Christiansson said Christian musicians had generally struggled to gain mass-media exposure in Germany, making the development encouraging. The article noted the band had been playing together for six years by that point, but that members had only begun working on the band full-time from August 1980. At the time, Jerusalem's records were among the best-selling Christian records in England, and a tour of Spain was being planned for that May or June.

=== Warrior, MTV, and Can't Stop Us Now (1981–1985) ===
The album Krigsman (Warrior) (1981/1982) is regarded as a significant release in Jerusalem's catalogue and became one of the band's best-known albums internationally. The album was produced by Northern Irish producer Andy Kidd and became Jerusalem's best-selling release, with combined sales of the Swedish and English-language ("Warrior") editions exceeding 100,000 copies. In her review of Krigsman (Warrior) for Dagen, Ulrika Djurfeldt praised the album's genuinely heavy rock sound, noting that it almost sounded as though it had been recorded live. She also singled out the cover art as effectively reinforcing the album's title, and praised the inclusion of full lyrics, though she felt the songs could be difficult to fully grasp without some familiarity with the Bible and Christian idiom. She particularly highlighted the twelve-minute track "Sodom," which likens Sweden to the sinful biblical city, and "It's Mad," which she described as a modern retelling of the story of the walls of Jericho.

Following the release of the English-language version of Warrior, Jerusalem gained further international exposure when their video for the song "It's Mad" was scheduled for broadcast on MTV in 1982 (before both DeGarmo & Key and Stryper). Billboard described the appearance as "the first break for 'gospel rock' on MTV", noting that the channel accepted the video based on its quality rather than the band's Christian identity. Jerusalem were also billed to appear at the Greenbelt festival's 10th-anniversary event in 1983, held that year at Knebworth Park, Hertfordshire.

Jerusalem's fourth album, Vi Kan Inte Stoppas (Can't Stop Us Now) (1983), included a stylistic change to a more melodic rock sound with less overtly God-centered lyrics. A 1983 profile in the Swedish magazine Okej described the change in direction on Vi Kan Inte Stoppas and its lead single "Let's Go Dancing" as a deliberate stylistic evolution rather than a departure from the band's faith; Christiansson said Jerusalem remained free of the "Christian hard rock" label abroad even as it drew scrutiny at home. The same article noted the band's continued international touring, including an appearance at Wembley in London on 12 October 1983 that was broadcast on British television the following January, and a forthcoming 45-day tour of the United States, Canada, South Africa and New Zealand. An early-1985 follow-up feature in OKEJ, headlined "Jerusalem – the group that's bigger abroad than at home", reported that Vi Kan Inte Stoppas had by then sold more than 30,000 copies in Sweden, and bassist Peter Carlsohn discussed the band's growing audiences on successive US tours. At the time, the band was preparing to enter the studio that March to record its fifth album ahead of a planned three-month US tour.

A February 1985 profile of Stryper in Christianity Today cited Jerusalem alongside Petra, Rez Band, and Barnabas as Christian rock acts that had largely failed to sell albums or concert tickets to audiences outside the church, according to Refuge Records president Ray Nenow, who said the industry's distribution infrastructure simply was not built to get such records into secular stores.

The band's US touring through this period was captured on the live album In His Majesty's Service, released in December 1985. A contemporary review in Dagen by Thord Andersson found Jerusalem "back on old tracks" after the more experimental sound of Vi Kan Inte Stoppas, describing the record as heavy and raw but missing some of the joyful, upbeat quality that had once characterised the band; he singled out the ballad "Read Between the Lines" as the album's strongest moment, and praised keyboardist Dan Tibell's playing on "Time" and Christiansson's vocal range. A 2018 review of a remastered reissue in Heaven's Metal magazine offered a more expansive retrospective assessment, noting the album was the band's only live recording made on American soil and the only Jerusalem release never issued in a Swedish-language version. Four of its tracks — "In His Majesty's Service", "From the Bottom of Our Heart", "The Tide", and "Time" — never appeared on any studio album, and two tracks omitted from a 1990s Fruit Records CD reissue were restored for the 2018 remaster.

=== Hiatus and Dancing on the Head of the Serpent (1985–1987) ===
In 1985, Jerusalem stopped touring and relocated to Uppsala with their families to attend Word of Life Bible School, all except keyboardist Dan Tibell. Jerusalem released a fifth album in 1987 called Dancing on the Head of the Serpent featuring Reidar I. Paulsen on the keyboards. The record sleeve depicted a person clad in denim jeans and boots, appearing to be half human and half lizard. This radical image shocked many Swedish Christians, and some record stores banned the album, while others continued to stock and sell the album, albeit under the sales counter. Christiansson said the backlash was confined entirely to Sweden, with no negative reaction to the cover anywhere else the album was sold.

Despite the controversy over the album's cover, Dagen critic Rickard Flykt gave some space to the music itself in his review of Dancing on the Head of the Serpent, published 1 December 1987 under the headline "Kristendom som kristen dom" ("Christianity as Christian Judgment"). Most of the review focused on the cover and the boycott by Christian bookstores, but where Flykt did address the music, his assessment was favourable: he described the album as melodic heavy rock in a 1970s style, with Christiansson again demonstrating himself to be a hard rock vocalist of international calibre.After this album, the band took a six-year hiatus.

=== Reunion and Prophet (1992–1994) ===
Following the band's hiatus, they reunited in December 1992. Christiansson has said he felt compelled to return to public ministry in April 1992, and, after a period of prayer, gathered the other band members that December; he described the unanimous response from all involved, including their wives and children, as "somewhat of a miracle" after years apart. In September 1993, the band relocated from Uppsala back to Gothenburg, Christiansson's hometown, where he described the church they joined as "behind you one hundred per cent."Two years later, in 1994, they released Prophet, recorded from twelve hours of unscripted studio improvisation with the band playing together without a single song written in advance; Christiansson wrote the lyrics for the roughly 65 minutes of resulting material afterwards and recorded his vocals separately. A contemporary review in Dagen described the album's sound as a blend of U2 and Lenny Kravitz, noted its lyrics had moved away from the more triumphalist tone of Dancing on the Head of the Serpent toward more nuanced reflections on human dependence on God, and called it by far the heaviest, and therefore the best, Jerusalem album ever made, predicting its reinvented sound would resonate far beyond the Christian music scene. Following the release, Jerusalem supported the American Christian rock band Petra for their shows in Birmingham, England; Zoetermeer, Netherlands; Fulda, Germany; and Oslo, Norway in May 1994.

=== Archival albums and touring reunions (1996–2006) ===
In 1996, Christiansson drew on years of previously unreleased material and reunited the band's early-1980s lineup — bassist Anders Mossberg, drummer Klas Anderhell, and keyboardist Dan Tibell — for Volym tre., which he produced himself. A Dagen review admitted to initial worry that the record would amount to a nostalgia cash-in, but concluded that Jerusalem's strength had always been its live performances, hampered on record by a lack of producers who understood hard rock — with the exception of Prophet two years earlier — and praised Volym tre as a genuine return to form with a sound as heavy as its songs deserved. The same lineup released a follow-up, Volüm fyra, the next year, to a considerably harsher reception: the same reviewer, in a piece headlined "Nu räcker det, Jerusalem" ("That's enough now, Jerusalem"), argued the distinctive melodies that had long characterised the band were largely absent, suggested its strongest tracks should have been folded into Volym tre instead, and expressed hope that the band's next release would be a sequel to the "very strong" Prophet rather than another round of archival material. A brief US review in HM Magazine took a more favorable view of the album than Thoms had, comparing its 70s hard-rock sound to Thin Lizzy and saying the reviewer was "not ashamed to recommend" it.

In 2003, Jerusalem returned to touring with all of its original members reunited, premiering the tour in Halmstad; Christiansson was living in Florida and working on music there at the time.

In 2006, a previously unknown Jerusalem studio recording was discovered in a box of the band's concert bootlegs, on a cassette labelled "Från garaget" ("From the garage"). Based on the songs and arrangements, the recording is believed to date from the winter or spring of 1983, when the band — then Christiansson, Peter Carlsohn, Dan Tibell, and Mikael Ulvsgärd — lived communally in Sollebrunn and rehearsed in a local sports hall, where the recording was made. Christiansson confirmed the sessions took place but said he had entirely forgotten about them.

=== She and the end of an era (2010–2011) ===
In 2010, the band released She, ending a thirteen-year gap since Volüm fyra (1997), its previous studio album. For the first time in the band's history, the record was made as a three-piece — Christiansson, Peter Carlsohn, and Michael Ulvsgärd, with no keyboardist — and drawn from roughly 600 hours of accumulated material, ultimately narrowed to thirteen songs plus two bonus tracks. The album was launched with a release concert streamed live via the Christian television channel Vision Norge and the band's own website, and was promoted through a network of fan "co-runners" who helped support and distribute it directly. Christiansson, then 60, said the band wanted the record to help "awaken a slumbering Christianity," and reflected that Prophet (1994) could, in his view, have reached a considerably wider audience than it did, given the strength of its reception at the time. She charted on Sverigetopplistan, Sweden's official albums chart, entering at number 40 on 29 October 2010 and spending two weeks on the chart.

In December 2011, Dagen reported that the trio of Ulvsgärd, Christiansson, and Carlsohn had decided not to continue working together, describing it as a closed chapter in the band's history, though Jerusalem itself would continue.In the same year, in a guest column in Dagen, pastor and Equmenia general secretary Patric Forsling wrote that Christiansson and Jerusalem had shaped his Christian faith and thinking more than any preacher, Sunday school teacher, or academic theologian, describing Christiansson as, in the piece's own words, "på sätt och vis en teolog" ("in a way, a theologian") despite being simply a lyricist, guitarist, and singer. Forsling wrote that he had listened to the band's first four albums thousands of times.

=== A new generation (2014–present) ===
In 2014, the band undertook its most ambitious touring effort in some years, the "Father2Son" tour; the lineup included Christiansson's son, Philip Christiansson, on guitar and vocals, alongside drummer Mick Nordström, keyboardist and guitarist CJ Grimmark, and the returning Mossberg on bass. Philip has continued performing alongside his father on tour since.

The same year, Christiansson published an autobiography, Det var värt alltihop ("It Was All Worth It"), recounting his life and the band's history.

Jerusalem made its first appearance at Sweden Rock Festival on 6 June 2015.

In 2023, Jerusalem released Stygn, their first new studio album in twelve years and their first entirely Swedish-language studio album in some four decades. Its production had been delayed for several years by the COVID-19 pandemic and by illness among band members, and it featured musicians who had played with Jerusalem at various points across its history.

Writing in the secular Swedish outlet Rocknytt around the album's release, journalist Jerry Prütz — who said he had seen the band close to 40 times since the late 1970s — argued that Jerusalem, in his view and that of many others, had never received the recognition it deserved in accounts of Swedish hard rock history, a gap he attributed partly to the band's explicitly Christian message despite their songs and volume matching that of their contemporaries.

== Members ==
Current

Jerusalem currently has two line-ups

- Ulf Christiansson – vocals, guitar (1975–present)
- Dan Tibell – keyboards (1975–1985, 1996–present)
- Reidar I. Paulsen – keyboards (1986? - 1995?, 2006–present)*
- Anders Mossberg – bass (1978? - 1981?, 1996–present)
- Peter Carlsohn – bass (1981–1995, 2003? - present)
- Klas Anderhell – drums (1979? - 1981, 1996–present)
- Michael Ulvsgärd – drums (1981–1995, 2003? - present)

Past

- Bertil Sörensson – bass (1978?)
- Danne Gansmoe – drums (1978?)

A lot of different musicians were at one time or another part of Jerusalem. These are just the ones who recorded with Jerusalem.

*Reidar Ingvald Paulsen changed name in 2007 for Reidar Ingvald Paasche

== Discography ==
For albums released in both Swedish and English versions, the English titles are in parentheses.

=== Studio albums ===
- Jerusalem (Volume 1) (1978/1980)
- Volym 2 (Volume 2) (1980/1981)
- Krigsman (Warrior) (1981/1982)
- Vi Kan Inte Stoppas (Can't Stop Us Now) (1983/1984: English language) The English language version was released in 1984 on Refuge Records in the United States.
- Dancing on the Head of the Serpent (1987)
- Prophet (1994)
- Volym 3 (Those Were the Days) (1996/1997)
- Volüm Fyra (R.A.D.) (1997/1998)
- She (2010)
- Stygn (2023)

=== Live albums ===
- In His Majesty's Service – Live in USA (1985)
- Live – På Ren Svenska (1998)

=== Compilation albums ===
- 10 Years After (1988)
- Klassiker 1 (Classics 1) (1993/1996)
- Klassiker 2 (Classics 2) (1993/1996)
- Classics 3 (1995)
- Tretti (2006)
- Greatest Hits (2006)
