= Theocracy (disambiguation) =

Theocracy is a form of government in which a deity is recognized as the supreme civil ruler.

Theocracy may also refer to:

- Theocracy (band), a metal band
  - Theocracy (album), an album by the same band
- Theocracy (computer game), a computer strategy game
