= Barnabas (band) =

American Christian rock band

- Origin: Los Angeles, California
- Genres: Christian rock, Christian metal, hard rock, blues, punk rock
- Years active: 1977–1986
- Past members: Nancy Jo Mann; Brian Belew; Gary Mann; Kris Klingensmith; Monte Cooley; Lance Johnson; Carolyn Joy; Rojelio; Mick Donner; Kris Brauninger

Barnabas was a Christian hard rock band that was active from 1977 through 1986. The name of the band was in honor of the New Testament disciple Barnabas. Originating out of the Jesus movement of the 1970s, they are considered one of the pioneers of Christian hard rock and heavy metal, along with Agape, Daniel Band, Jerusalem, and Resurrection Band.

Over their career as a band, Barnabas was based in Los Angeles, Schaumburg, Illinois, Des Moines, Iowa, and Edmond, Oklahoma. Barnabas recorded five studio albums and played a relatively small number of concerts. Throughout their career, the band suffered from attacks by prominent Christian lecturers, which ultimately contributed to their break-up in 1986.

== Band history ==
Monte Cooley founded the band in southern California in 1977 as according to him he was unaware of Resurrection Band and therefore did not know of any Christian groups playing hard rock or heavy metal at the time. Cooley placed an ad in Guitar Center that he wanted to form a Christian heavy metal band, and soon bassist Gary Mann and drummer Lance Johnson joined the band. Cooley originally wanted Darrell Mansfield as a vocalist, but Mansfield turned down the offer so Carolyn Joy was recruited instead. Lance Johnson and Carolyn Joy performed live with the band for a short time, and second guitarist David Storrs was also involved with the band during this period. However, all three left within the first year. The band briefly had a drummer known as Roy, but he was soon replaced by Kris Klingensmith (Kris k.) who took over on drums. Nancy Jo Mann (later Nancyjo or NJo) then joined the band on vocals after being discovered through an ad in a local paper. The band recorded their first album, Hear the Light, in 1980 in a Los Angeles studio. After this, the band briefly visited Highway Missionary Society in Rogue River, Oregon before moving to Jesus People USA in Chicago for an equally short stay. Next, they moved to nearby Schaumburg, Illinois.

After completion of the first album, Monte decided to leave the band, and was replaced by Michael (Mick) Donner. Two guitarists Michael "Mick" Donner and Kris Brauninger, joined the band, and the whole outfit relocated to Des Moines, Iowa, the hometown of Nancy Jo. A second album, Find Your Heart a Home, was recorded in 1981. Following this, both Mick and Kris Brauninger left after the second album was recorded, and Brian Belew joined as a guitarist. With this lineup Barnabas joined Light Records and recorded 1983's Approaching Light Speed and 1984's Feel the Fire. The band then relocated to Edmond, Oklahoma. However, throughout their career the band faced constant criticism from church organizations and ministers such as Bob Larson, Jimmy Swaggart, and Bill Gothard, and this, combined with the pressures of maintaining the band, Barnabas decided to disband after playing at Toronto Greenfest in 1985. The band's contract obligations required them to release another album, Little Foxes, which was released in 1986, after which the group disbanded.

In 1992, Kris Klingensmith, Royce Priem and Dean Ross launched a project to release a compilation CD called The Gospel According to Barnabas on Thorne Records (Joyful Noise Evangelistic Association, JNEA), which was remixed by John and Dino Elefante of Mastedon. The original masters were licensed from Light Records. Due to legal restrictions, original cover art and song order could not be used. This was released in 1992, but CD-reissues of Barnabas's old albums would not come out until the late 1990s.

The band's official website, "Homeplanet", was launched in February 1997 and continues today as a repository of Barnabas history, discography, posters, and other historic items. It also features the popular phpBB message board, "the manifest". Most of the former band members have posted there in the past. Currently, Kris and Nancyjo are participating actively on the manifest.

Klingensmith was instrumental in developing the Homeplanet website content, and also pushed through the reissue of all five Barnabas albums on CD, a process that began in 1998 and ended in 2004.

== Style and legacy ==
Barnabas are considered an important part of the 1970s Jesus Movement and played a pivotal role in establishing Christian rock, along with groups such as Agape, Daniel Band, DeGarmo and Key, Petra, Resurrection Band, Servant, and Sweet Comfort Band. They are also cited as a pioneer of Christian metal and hard rock, filling the gap on a timeline after Resurrection Band and Jerusalem and before Daniel Band. On earlier albums, Barnabas adopted a mixture of hard rock, heavy blues, and metal, before adopting a full metal sound with a science-fiction and futuristic flair on their high-point album, Approaching Light Speed. The e-zine The Phantom Tollbooth referred to the band's style as punk rock. They maintained a significant following before disappearing after their break up.

=== Nancy Jo Mann ===
Nancy Jo Mann's vocal style has been described as "powerhouse," drawing influence from Wendy Kaiser and Janis Joplin.

After the break up of Barnabas, Mann went put her energies into Women Exploited by Abortion, which she had established in 1982. Eight years before, in 1974, Mann underwent a botched saline abortion when she was twenty-two, which caused serious complications. According to Randy Alcorn, Mann was the first to identify consistent psychological effects of abortion.

Nancy Jo Mann would later be one of many musicians whose stories were featured in the book God's Not Dead (And Neither Are We) by Jerry Wilson, which discusses pioneers of alternative Christian rock in the 1980s.

== Members ==
=== Final lineup ===
- Nancy Jo Mann - lead vocals, (1979-1986)
- Brian Belew - guitar (1982-1986)
- Gary Mann - bass and keyboards (1977-1986)
- Kris Klingensmith - drums, percussion (1979-1986)

=== Former members ===
- Carolyn Joy - lead vocals, acoustic guitar (1977-1978)
- Monte Cooley - guitar (1977-1980)
- David Storrs - guitar (1977-1979)
- Lance Johnson - drums (1977-1978)
- Rojelio ("Roy") - drums (1978)
- Mick Donner - guitar (1980-1981)
- Kris Brauninger - guitar, keyboards (1980-1981)

== Discography ==
Singles:

- Directory Assistance / Nicodemus (1979; Brazen Serpent Records) (7" vinyl (45 RPM))
- Waiting For The Aliens (1983; Light Records) (Vinyl, 12", 45 RPM, Promo)
- Feel The Fire (1984; Light Records) (Vinyl, 12", Maxi-Single, Promo)

Albums:

- Hear the Light (1980; Tunesmith Records) (Remastered in 2017 by Retroactive Records)
- Find Your Heart a Home (1982; Tunesmith Records) (Remastered in 2017 by Retroactive Records)
- Approaching Light Speed (1983; Light Records) (Remastered in 2000 by Millenium Eight Records) (Remastered in 2017 by Retroactive Records)
- Feel the Fire (1984; Light Records) (Remastered in 2017 by Retroactive Records)
- Little Foxes (1986; Light Records) (Remastered in 2017 by Retroactive Records)

Later reissues and special recordings:

- The Gospel According to Barnabas (1992) - CD compilation of re-mixed versions of Approaching Light Speed, Feel the Fire
- Artifacts and Relics (2000) - CD compilation of various unreleased tracks, including a recording of a Barnabas rehearsal
- Hear the Light / Find Your Heart a Home (1999) - compilation reissue, 2 recordings on 1 CD
- Feel the Fire / Little Foxes (2004) - compilation reissue, 2 recordings on 1 CD
