= Dancing on the Head of the Serpent =

Studio album by Jerusalem
- Released: 1987
- Recorded: Jerusalem Studio, Uppsala, Sweden
- Genre: Heavy metal, hard rock
- Length: 40:38
- Label: JM
- Producer: Ulf Christiansson

Jerusalem chronology
In His Majesty's Service – Live in USA (1985)	Dancing on the Head of the Serpent (1987)	10 Years After (1988)

Alternative cover
- US cover

Professional ratings
Review scores
Source	Rating
CCM Magazine	?

Dancing on the Head of the Serpent is the fifth studio album, and the sixth album overall, by the Swedish hard rock band Jerusalem. Unlike their first four studio albums, it was recorded only in English, although there are two different versions. The original version was released in Scandinavia in 1987 on JM Records. In 1988, Refuge Records released a re-recorded and remixed version in the United States, with slightly different artwork. This was the first Jerusalem album to be released on CD. A 30th-anniversary remastered release included both versions of the album on two CDs.

The general lyrical theme of the album is "war against Satan", but songs such as "Still" focus on forgiveness and restoration.

== Album cover controversy ==
The record sleeve, painted by Rolf Jansson of Norway, depicts the leg of a person wearing jeans and boots—the standard attire among rockers—jumping on the head of a "demonic creature". This radical image proved too shocking for Swedish Christians and was banned by some resellers.

== Track listing ==
All songs by Ulf Christiansson.

1. "Dancing on the Head of the Serpent"
2. "Plunder Hell and Populate Heaven"
3. "Rebels of Jesus Christ"
4. "Listen to Me"
5. "Woe, Woe... The Great Fall"
6. "We're Gonna Take Europe"
7. "Come Higher"
8. "Catch the Devil, Catch the Thief"
9. "The Night When Revelation Came into My Life"
10. "Still"

== Personnel ==
- Ulf Christiansson - lead vocals, guitar
- Peter Carlsohn - bass guitar, background vocals
- Reidar I Paulsen - keyboards, background vocals
- Mikael Ulvsgärd - drums, background vocals
