= Mosaic (Theocracy album) =

Studio album by Theocracy
- Released: October 13, 2023
- Recorded: 2022–2023
- Genres: Christian metal, progressive metal, power metal
- Length: 66:06
- Label: Atomic Fire
- Producer: Matt Smith

Theocracy chronology
Ghost Ship (2016)	Mosaic (2023)

Singles from Mosaic
- 1. "Return to Dust" Released: August 11, 2023; 2. "Mosaic" Released: September 17, 2023

Professional ratings
Review scores
Source	Rating
Angelic Warlord	100%
The Dark Melody	9.4/10
Eternal Terror	5.5/6
Jesus Freak Hideout	4.5/5
Metal-Roos	5/5

Mosaic is the fifth studio album by Christian progressive power metal band Theocracy. It was released on October 13, 2023 via Atomic Fire Records, after departing from Ulterium Records. Music videos were released for "Return to Dust" and the title track. The album has received highly positive feedback from critics.

== Track listing ==
No.	Title	Length
1.	"Flicker"	3:58
2.	"Anonymous"	5:49
3.	"Mosaic"	5:25
4.	"Sinsidious (The Dogs of War)"	6:46
5.	"Return to Dust"	4:26
6.	"The Sixth Great Extinction"	5:26
7.	"Deified"	4:18
8.	"The Greatest Hope"	3:14
9.	"Liar, Fool, or Messiah"	7:37
10.	"Red Sea"	19:07
Total length:		66:06

== Personnel ==
- Matt Smith – lead vocals, percussion
- Taylor Washington – lead guitar, lead vocals on track 4
- Jonathan Hinds – rhythm guitar, percussion, backing vocals
- Jared Oldham – bass guitar, backing vocals
- Ernie Topran – drums
