= Hell's Bells =

Hell's Bells or Hells Bells may refer to:

== Music ==
- "Hells Bells" (song), a 1980 song by AC/DC
- Hells Bells (album), a 1980 album by John Hicks
- "Hell's Bells", a piece of music written by Art Kassel and recorded in 1932
- "Hell's Bells", a 1979 song by Bruford from One of a Kind

== Film and television ==
- Hell's Bells (film), a Walt Disney Silly Symphonies cartoon
- Hell's Bells: The Dangers of Rock 'N' Roll, a 1989 Christian documentary film about rock and roll
- Hell's Bells (TV series), a British comedy series starring Derek Nimmo
- "Hell's Bells" (Buffy the Vampire Slayer), a 2002 episode of Buffy the Vampire Slayer

== Other uses ==
- Hell's Bells (play), a 1925 comedy play by Barry Conners
- Hells Bells (cave formations), subaqueous rock formations in the El Zapote cenote of Mexico
- Deadly Towers or Hell's Bells, a game for the Nintendo Entertainment System
- Datura stramonium or hell's bells, a hallucinogenic plant species

== See also ==
- "The Bells of Hell Go Ting-a-ling-a-ling", a popular song from World War I
- Belle Gunness, a Norwegian-American serial killer nicknamed "Hell's Belle"
- Hell's Belles (disambiguation)
