= As the World Bleeds =

Studio album by Theocracy
- Released: November 21, 2011
- Recorded: 2011
- Genre: Christian metal, progressive metal, power metal
- Length: 61:58
- Label: Ulterium
- Producer: Matt Smith

Theocracy chronology
| Mirror of Souls (2008) | As the World Bleeds (2011) | Ghost Ship (2016) |

Professional ratings
Review scores
| Source | Rating |
|---|---|
| Hallowed | 4/7 |
| Indie Vision | 5/5 |
| Jesus Freak Hideout | 4.5/5 |

As the World Bleeds is the third album by Christian progressive power metal band Theocracy. It was released by Ulterium Records on November 21, 2011 in North America, November 25 in Europe, and April 25, 2012 in Japan. A live rehearsal video was released for the song "Nailed" in 2014, featuring drummer Patrick Nickell.

== Track listing ==
All tracks are written by Matt Smith.

| No. | Title | Length |
|---|---|---|
| 1. | "I Am" | 11:00 |
| 2. | "The Master Storyteller" | 4:09 |
| 3. | "Nailed" | 6:25 |
| 4. | "Hide in the Fairytale" | 4:27 |
| 5. | "The Gift of Music" | 7:12 |
| 6. | "30 Pieces of Silver" | 5:08 |
| 7. | "Drown" | 5:29 |
| 8. | "Altar to the Unknown God" | 5:44 |
| 9. | "Light of the World" | 4:28 |
| 10. | "As the World Bleeds" | 7:56 |
| Total length: | | 61:58 |

Japanese edition
| No. | Title | Length |
|---|---|---|
| 1. | "The Master Storyteller" | 4:09 |
| 2. | "Nailed" | 6:25 |
| 3. | "Hide in the Fairytale" | 4:27 |
| 4. | "30 Pieces of Silver" | 5:08 |
| 5. | "The Gift of Music" | 7:12 |
| 6. | "Light of the World" | 4:28 |
| 7. | "Drown" | 5:29 |
| 8. | "Altar to the Unknown God" | 5:44 |
| 9. | "As the World Bleeds" | 7:56 |
| 10. | "I Am" | 11:00 |
| 11. | "I’m in a Cage" | 4:02 |
| 12. | "Martyr (Live in Studio)" | 7:04 |
| Total length: | | 73:04 |

== Personnel ==
- Matt Smith - lead vocals, keyboards
- Jonathan Hinds - guitar, backing vocals
- Shawn Benson - drums, backing vocals
- Jared Oldham - bass, backing vocals
- Van Allen Wood - guitar
