= Christian metal =

Heavy metal music with a Christian message and band members

- Other names: White metal; heavenly metal; Jesus metal
- Stylistic origins: Heavy metal; Jesus music; Christian rock; Christian music
- Cultural origins: Late 1970s, United States and Sweden

Fusion genres
- Unblack metal; Christian death metal

Regional scenes
- United States; Brazil; Argentina; Mexico; Germany; Netherlands; Norway; Sweden; Finland

Other topics
- Artists; Christian hardcore

Christian metal, also known as white metal, Jesus metal or heavenly metal, is heavy metal music distinguished by its Christian-themed song lyrics and the dedication of the band-members to Christianity. Christian metal is typically performed by professed Christians, principally for Christians and is often produced and distributed alongside various other genres of Christian music.

Christian metal bands exist in most of the subgenres of heavy metal music, and the only common link among most Christian metal bands are the lyrics. The Christian themes are often melded with the subjects of the genre the band is rooted in, regularly providing a Christian take on the subject matter. It has been argued that the marginal yet transnational Christian metal subculture provides its core members with an alternative religious expression and Christian identity, and that the music serves the purpose of offering a positive message through lyrical content. This may not necessarily show a direct connection or reference to the Christian faith, although it often does.

Christian metal emerged in the late 1970s as a means of evangelization to the wider heavy metal music scene. The genre was pioneered by the American Resurrection Band and Barnabas, the Swedish Jerusalem, and Canadian Daniel Band. In the mid to late 1980s, extreme metal genres were popularized by bands such as Vengeance Rising, Deliverance, Believer, and Tourniquet. Another Christian metal band that was successful during the '80s was American band Stryper, whose album To Hell with the Devil sold over two million copies.

In the early 1990s, the Australian death metal band Mortification rose to prominence within its country's underground metal scene. At the turn of the 21st century, having released two platinum-selling albums, P.O.D. achieved a mainstream commercial success rivaling that of Stryper. The metalcore groups Underoath (2002-2018), Demon Hunter, As I Lay Dying, and Norma Jean (dubbed "The Holy Alliance" by Revolver Magazine) also brought some mainstream attention to the movement in the first decade of the 2000s, achieving ranks in the Billboard 200.

== Characteristics ==
Christian metal is not a solitary style of music but rather an ideological umbrella term that comprises every subgenre of heavy metal music, from hard rock to black metal. What sets the style apart is that Christian metal bands typically base their lyrics on Judeo-Christian traditions. AllMusic writes that Christian metal is "gospel music's hard rock" - while not as hard as most heavy metal, "it still has many of its trademarks, particularly loud guitars, bombastic riffs, long solos, and pseudo-operatic vocals." According to the website, most bands fall somewhere between arena rock and pop metal, although occasionally there are bands that are heavier. Author Michael Heatley notes, however, that Christian metal exists within most of the musical subgenres of metal, and Jussi Lahtonen of the Finnish punk and metal zine Sue similarly writes how Christian metal encompasses every metal subgenre. The lyrics can be either explicitly Christian theological topics or else approaching other social or cultural issues from a Christian perspective. Some emphasize the positive aspects of faith matters while others iterate the teachings of Christ. Some bands keep their message hidden in metaphors. A minority take an aggressive attitude towards those who speak against Christianity, preaching "fire and brimstone" and "Old Testament Wrath of God" back at extreme Satanists. References to eschatology and apocalyptic themes, particularly the ongoing spiritual warfare between good and evil as well as the Last Judgment and fall from grace are typical.

The lyrical style varies depending on culture, denomination, and country. For example, in Northern Europe, the bands with Lutheran members usually prefer a personal lyrical approach, which is seldom meant to "convert" in an aggressive manner; this is because evangelism has been more typical among American bands. Christian bands never deny their conviction but typically avoid preaching; sometimes, the matter is left unexpressed, leaving religion as a private issue of the listener. Certain bands choose to deal with everyday life experiences from a Christian perspective in order to draw both Christian and non-Christian listeners. In such cases, identifying a "Christian band" can be difficult. Secular bands that occasionally deal with Christian topics are a different matter altogether. Defining a Christian band is a much debated issue on Christian metal forums. A Christian band is expected to have either professed Christian members or a Christian message, preferably both.

== History ==
=== Background: Heavy metal music and Christianity ===
The term 'heavy metal', as it was used by Lester Bangs and Dave Marsh at Creem, referred to a sound best exemplified by albums such as Led Zeppelin's Led Zeppelin II, Deep Purple's Deep Purple in Rock, and Black Sabbath's Paranoid.

Among the early bands who were accused of adding negative connotations to the term was Black Sabbath. Their and other early bands' profligate use and combination of dark, occult themes, tattoos and piercings, and other features in stage- and album-styling; repeated musical features like distorted guitar-filters, open/power chords, riffs (including chords with roots a tritone apart); and moody explorations of diverse spiritual themes (including the social connections of metal-enthusiasts) led to a range of responses, from intense fandom and identification, widespread patronage for at least the most well-known albums and bands, and polarizing criticism.

Those uncomfortable with the musical and fan scene features of heavy metal, especially those on the religious right (sometimes including fans of other music, including mainstream and progressive rock) became more vocal through the 1970s and '80s, at worst casting the makers and fans of such music as "followers of Satan". Despite such accusations, more serious examinations of Black Sabbath lyrics find several songs actually advocate Christianity and specifically warn audiences about the Devil. Rolling Stone reviewer Lester Bangs noted the Christian theme of their song "After Forever" when it was released. Further, as Deena Weinstein and others have established, the vast majority of metal fans are male, white, and blue-collar-identified. Although there are now metal fans of more-advanced ages, from its origins through the 1980s their age centered on teen years.

Bands such as Mötley Crüe, Ratt, and Twisted Sister took "themes of generalized rage, sexual abandon, drug abuse, violence, and despair into the homes of millions of young record buyers." In the 1980s, with the growing appeal of metal, the National Coalition on Television Violence "called attention to the destructive potential of music videos, many of which graphically depict violence and rebellion." A British cleric and metal fan analysed that because of distorted guitar sounds, "intense" beats and "muscular" vocals, heavy metal music songs are "unafraid to deal with death, violence and destruction" and that "much of metal's fascination with Satan or evil is play-acting, driven by a desire to shock." The Italian Capuchin friar and former metal vocalist Cesare Bonizzi ("Fratello Metallo") stated that there are "maybe" some Satanic metal bands "but I think it's an act so that they sell more," and went to add that "metal is the most energetic, vital, deep and true musical language that I know."

Some metal songs criticize religion, such as "Death Church" by Machine Head, which "critici[zes] the hypocrisy of the Christian church." Metal groups "…seek out every…avenue to assault religion", including "religious hypocrisy", specifically Christianity. Metal songs use themes from the Book of Revelation which focus on apocalypse (e.g., Iron Maiden's "Number of the Beast"). The metal subgenre with the most emphasis on apocalyptic themes is thrash metal. Anti-patriarchal themes are common in metal. Black metal song lyrics usually attack Christianity using apocalyptic language and Satanic elements.

=== Origins ===
Christian metal has its origins in the late 1960s and early 1970s in the Jesus movement, a hippie movement with Christian ideology consisting of hippies that converted to Christianity. The Christian hippies within this movement, known as "Jesus People", developed a musical movement called Jesus music, which primarily began in southern California, ex. Los Angeles when hippie street musicians converted to Christianity. These musicians continued playing the same styles of music they had played before converting, among them heavy metal music, though they infused their lyrics with a Christian message. Larry Norman was one of the earliest Christian rock musicians who released his first album titled Upon This Rock in 1969 which is arguably the first Christian rock album produced. Norman's song "Why Should the Devil Have All the Good Music?" summarised the ideas of these musicians.

The first Christian hard rock group was possibly the California-based band Agape, formed in the late 1960s. Known for their psychedelic rock and blues influences, the band released an album titled Gospel Hard Rock in 1971, followed by Victims of Tradition in 1972. After Agape, the Resurrection Band was formed in 1972 in Milwaukee's Jesus People community and released the hard rock album Music to Raise the Dead in 1974. The Swedish group Jerusalem was formed in 1975 and is cited as another early Christian hard rock group. In 1978, Resurrection Band released its album Awaiting Your Reply and Jerusalem released Jerusalem (Volume 1). Both albums had a notable impact on Christian music culture. During that time, heavy metal was a new style of music for the Christian music industry, and many Christian labels did not expect it to sell well. However, Awaiting Your Reply hit big in the Christian market, and reached No. 6 on the Gospel album sales charts. Jerusalem also became an instant hit among listeners, and within the first six months the record sold 20,000 copies, unheard of within the genre of Christian rock in Europe. The Canadian Daniel Band is cited among the first bands, as is Barnabas.

=== 1980s ===
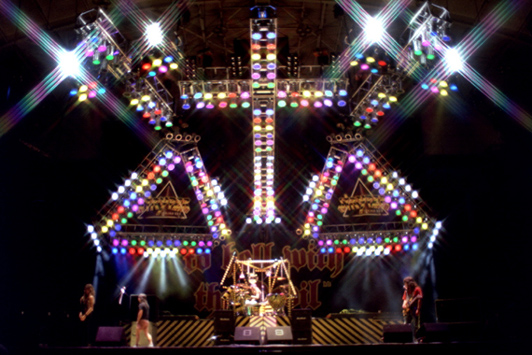
Stryper's stage set during To Hell with the Devil tour, 1986

In the early 1980s, there were four notable Christian heavy metal groups: Messiah Prophet, Leviticus, Saint, and Stryper. Although it is debatable as to which band was formed first, the Orange County native glam metal group Stryper was the most popular one and the first Christian metal band to achieve mainstream commercial success, reaching platinum sales status and consistent MTV airplay, though Christian metal acts including Resurrection Band, Swedish bands Leviticus and Jerusalem had been active since the 1970s and early 1980s. Jerusalem, had gained exposure on MTV as early as 1982, when their video "It's Mad" from the album Warrior was scheduled for broadcast; Billboard described it as a breakthrough for "gospel rock" on the channel. Stryper gained attention with their way of throwing Bibles to the audience at their concerts. Roxx Regime, the band's pre-Christian incarnation, had performed exclusively in secular venues on the Sunset Strip circuit alongside acts including Mötley Crüe, Ratt, and Quiet Riot, signing with Enigma Records as a secular act before their rededication to Christianity. Drummer Robert Sweet confirmed in 1985 that most Stryper audiences were "predominantly non-Christians." Cliff Burnstein, co-manager of Def Leppard and Metallica, described Stryper in December 1985 as "the biggest independent hard rock band in America." Stryper were featured as the defining act of the White Metal movement in a 1987 four-page feature by journalist Götz Kühnemund in German metal publication Metal Hammer, identifying them as the band that had given the movement its identity. In the beginning, mostly Christians went to Stryper's concerts but soon they reached non-Christian audience. In the 1980s, Christian metal bands closely followed the trends of mainstream heavy metal bands.

During the mid-1980s, heavy metal music divided into autonomous subgenres. Weinstein described the thematic diversity that cross-cuts musical styles: "In the 1980s, white metal and black metal emerged. Their lyrical themes are at polar opposites to each other, one of them bringing the 'good news' and the other the 'bad news.' Both include bands whose sounds span the full spectrum of metal. White metal is commonly called Christian metal. In part a response to the popularity of the heavy metal genre, it transforms the code of heavy metal to serve purposes of Evangelical Christian sects and other denominations. In part, also, Christian metal is a well-crafted missionary effort to recruit members and save souls. [...] Black metal stands in the thematic opposition to Christianity, not looking upward to heaven but setting its sights on the underworld. Satanic symbols and imagery have been a staple of heavy metal since its beginnings with Black Sabbath and Led Zeppelin. In the West, there is no better symbol for rebellion. But groups such as Mercyful Fate claimed that they were not playing. Their claims to be true believers, followers of the lord of the underworld, were seen by many to be a commercial ploy." Chicago doom metal group Trouble was known to be the first band that was publicly marketed as "white metal" since their early albums Psalm 9 and The Skull feature Biblical references. The origin of the "white metal" term remains unclear; it is merely known that the non-Christian label Metal Blade Records used "white metal" as a marketing term, in contrast to black metal.

Soon, the Christian metal bands became controversial for their beliefs and often evangelistic goals in the metal music scene, which typically holds individualism in particularly high esteem. Stryper encountered hostility from some secular metal audiences throughout their commercial peak. During a support slot opening for Raven and Anthrax, the band were physically assaulted by fans hostile to their Christian message — an incident documented by Billboard as evidence of the resistance the band faced in crossing over to secular metal audiences. Petra founder Bob Hartman independently noted in 1987 that Stryper concerts were regularly picketed by religious fundamentalists opposed to their heavy metal approach. Regardless of this, Stryper helped to popularize the genre. They were the first Christian band to reach platinum status on an album. The 1986 album To Hell with the Devil sold 2 million copies and achieved a Grammy nomination. The music videos for "Free", "Calling on You", and the power ballad "Honestly" all spent many weeks on MTV's Top 10, and "Free" was in the No. 1 position for 12 weeks (60 days), May 4 - July 24, 1987.

Not only was Christian metal criticized by non-Christian metal fans, but soon the movement was also criticized by fundamentalists; Allmusic wrote that "when church leaders were accusing heavy metal of encouraging Satanism, Stryper set out to prove that metal and hard rock could be used to promote Christianity. The southern California band was viewed with suspicion by both ministers (who refused to believe that Christianity and metal were compatible) and fellow headbangers—and yet, Stryper managed to sell millions of albums to both Christian and secular audiences." For example, the televangelist Jimmy Swaggart wrote a book titled Religious Rock n' Roll – A Wolf in Sheep's Clothing in 1987 and criticized the scene, particularly Stryper, for using heavy metal music to preach the gospel of Christianity.

In contrast, however, many Christian evangelists and church organizations took a more supportive role. For example, televangelist Jim Bakker expressed public support for the group Stryper, watching them perform and becoming personal friends with the band's members. Many new bands began to arise, eventually drawing the attention of record labels that specialized in Christian music.

==== Emergence of fanzines, record labels, and Sanctuary International ====
Christian metal soon developed into its own independent record labels and networks. The first Christian metal label was Pure Metal Records, a sublabel of Refuge Records. Soon there appeared other labels such as R.E.X. Records and Intense Records. Fanzines were published in several countries, with Heaven's Metal as the first one in the US in 1985. During that time, almost every Christian record label became interested in Christian metal, and they advertised the newly signed metal bands on their roster on Heaven's Metal since it was the only publication exclusively covering the movement. Soon Heaven's Metal achieved more popularity and became an official, professional publication. Heaven's Metal achieved a dedicated flock of 15,000 readers. Bands' sales usually rose when the ensembles were covered on the magazine. During the 1980s and early 1990s, the more underground Christian metal releases were typically distributed in Christian bookstores, and those as well as the fanzines also traded Christian metal cassette copies with the music fans.

Many rock and metal fans that became Christians through the ministry of Christian metal bands were rejected from churches in the 1980s. In 1984, California pastor Bob Beeman saw this problem and soon started the ministry called Sanctuary - The Rock and Roll Refuge. This fellowship brought many musicians together and formed groups such as Tourniquet, Deliverance, Vengeance and Mortal that would soon become ground breaking acts in Christian music culture. Sanctuary's first worship leader was Stryper's vocalist Michael Sweet and later Barren Cross' bass player Jim LaVerde. Sanctuary sponsored the first Christian metal festival, The Metal Mardi Gras, held in 1987 in Los Angeles. This proved influential and soon Christian metal festivals were organized elsewhere as well. Sanctuary's activities began spreading, and it had 36 parishes all over the United States at its peak by the 1990s. The Sanctuary parishes had a significant impact on the Christian metal movement: groups that would later become notable such as P.O.D. performed their first concerts in Sanctuary.

By the late 1990s, the parish's workers felt that regular churches' attitudes towards metalheads, rockers and punks had become more permissive, and therefore did not feel the need to keep Sanctuary going on any longer, hence, most of the parishes of Sanctuary were closed. Sanctuary became Sanctuary International, and it currently gives international studies and lessons on Christianity. Sanctuary also runs an internet radio station called "Intense Radio" which, in 2003, reached approximately 150,000 listeners.

=== Late 1980s and 1990s ===
Doug Van Pelt of HM Magazine stated that Christian metal had its "heyday" in the late 1980s and early 1990s. By 1987, there were more than a hundred Christian metal bands, and their records were sold at both Christian bookstores and non-Christian retails. By 1988, the four largest Christian metal bands (excluding the mainstream success Stryper) were Bloodgood, Barren Cross, Whitecross, and Leviticus. The Kentucky-based band Bride initially played speed metal, particularly on Live to Die, and reached a wider audience when they released Snakes in the Playground (1992). Despite being criticized for their abrupt changes in style in favor of what's "hot", are still considered "a primeval force at the centre of Christian heavy metal."

In 1989, the Orange County group X-Sinner released its debut album Get It, and was one of the most talked about bands within the white metal scene at the time. Noted for a classic metal sound similar to AC/DC, X-Sinner has managed to stay at the head of the Christian classic metal scene.

Glam metal band Holy Soldier, another group hailing from California, released its self-titled debut on Word and A&M Records (Myrrh imprint) in 1990 to critical and commercial acclaim. Two years later, the band followed up their debut with Last Train, another critical success, leading to a 60-city world tour. The band Guardian achieved some mainstream attention for its album Fire and Love, and one of the videos was included in the MTV's Headbangers Ball rotation. The heavy metal band Angelica introduced vocalist Rob Rock, who also achieved initial fame as the vocalist for guitar virtuoso Chris Impellitteri's band Impellitteri during the 1980s and 1990s and then went solo with his Rage of Creation album.

In the early 1990s, the rising musical styles, especially grunge, began to take their places as the dominant styles in the mainstream, which resulted in heavy metal music losing popularity and going underground for a decade. Many Christian metal musicians began to play extreme metal, and soon death metal replaced thrash metal in popularity. Audiences in many underground metal scenes began favoring more extreme sounds and disparaging the popular styles. As with other glam metal acts of the time, Stryper lost popularity and split up in 1993.

Bruce Moore writes in the e-book Metal Missionaries that during mid-1990s Christian metal "ceased to play catch up (replicating secular bands) and began to assimilate into its rightful place in the Extreme music scene and the artists who played became influential in helping to define this relatively new, but growing genre." With risen musical quality and more street-credibility, Christian metal and hardcore bands were signed to record labels such as Tooth and Nail, Solid State, Facedown Records as well as secular labels Metal Blade and Victory Records. Christian metal was available through non-Christian outlets; "For the first time Extreme Christian music moved from the dusty back bin of the Christian book stores to the front racks at super retailers like Best Buy, Circuit City, FYE and even giant retailers like Wal-Mart, Target and Hot Topic." The German secular metal label Nuclear Blast Records also released Christian metal.

=== 2000s ===
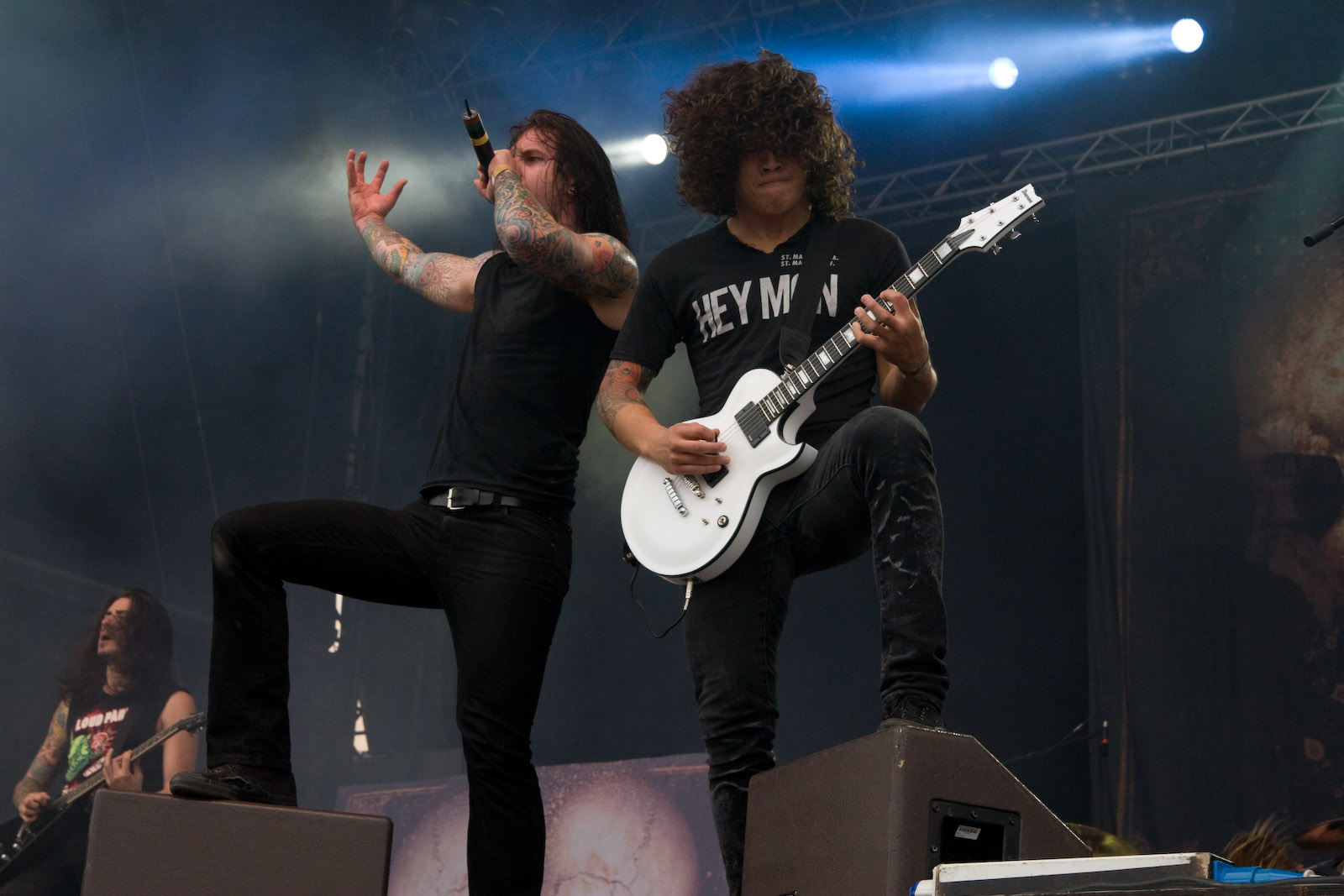
As I Lay Dying has been at the forefront of metalcore along with Underoath since 2005.

In the first decade of the 21st century, some groups reached mainstream popularity. There are Christian metal bands that perform virtually every subgenre of metal. The Christian metal movement has spread worldwide since it emerged in the early 1980s, and there are now hundreds of active Christian metal bands. Inspired by the metal revival, many 1980s bands have made comebacks including Saint, Bloodgood and Stryper. In October 2004, Doug Van Pelt brought Heaven's Metal back as its own fanzine. The Internet has had a significant role on the revival of Christian metal as well. Many websites and online communities are dedicated to discussions about Christian metal's music, events, and bands.

For the first time since Stryper's success in the 1980s, certain Christian metal artists found mainstream acceptance selling millions of albums to both Christian and non-Christian fans, including Underoath and P.O.D. The latter became the most successful Christian metal band when their 2001 album Satellite went multi-platinum, while the former's 2006 album, Define the Great Line, ranked No. 2 on the Billboard 200. Stryper would re-form in 2003 and eclipse over 10 million in total album sales. They had adopted more of a power metal sound than the "hair metal" style they were known for. Skillet, who is also often labeled as a metal band reached mainstream success while being open about their Christian faith. Their efforts have resulted in over 12 million units sold including two platinum albums. From their 2× platinum album Awake, the song "Monster" alone would sell over 3 million copies. From the same album, the song "Hero" would also reach multi-platinum status.

== Role in metal subgenres ==
=== Metalcore ===
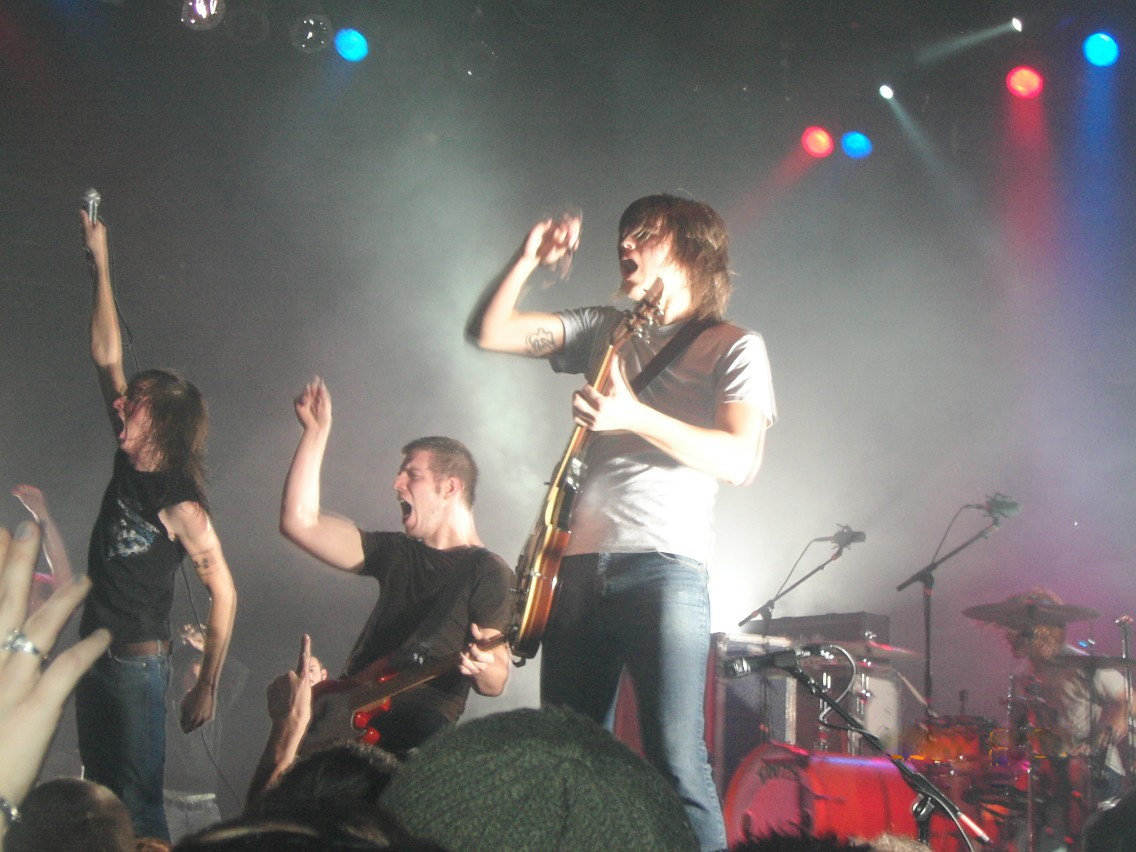
Underoath, one of the more prominent metalcore groups

Metalcore features many popular Christian bands, including such crossover bands such as Underoath, As I Lay Dying, August Burns Red, Blessthefall, Norma Jean, Haste the Day, The Devil Wears Prada, Confessions of a Traitor, Convictions, Silent Planet, Wolves at the Gate, For Today, Demon Hunter and Fit for a King. Many of these bands have Grammy nominated or have made it high in the charts of the Billboard 200. Norma Jean was nominated for a Grammy Award for "Best Recording Package" for their album O God, the Aftermath. As I Lay Dying entered the Billboard 200 charts (No. 8) for its record sales and were nominated for the "Best Metal Performance" Grammy for the single "Nothing Left" from the 2007 album An Ocean Between Us. The album made its debut on Metal Blade Records, charting at No. 19 in Canada. In the United States, nearly 40,000 units were sold in its first week. The second week after it was released, it charted at No. 39 in both the United States and Canada. Other Top 200 debuts around the world include a No. 117 in the United Kingdom and No. 154 in Japan. In 2011, The Devil Wears Prada's album Dead Throne charted at No. 10 in the Billboard 200. In 2015, August Burns Red was nominated for "Best Metal Performance" at the Grammys for their song "Identity", off their Found in Far Away Places album.

In its 2006 in Review issue (February 2007), Revolver magazine dubbed Christian metal the phenomenon of the year. Editor in Chief Tom Beaujour interviewed the lead vocalists of As I Lay Dying, Demon Hunter, Norma Jean, and Underoath (Tim Lambesis, Ryan Clark, Cory Brandan Putman, and Spencer Chamberlain, respectively) as the front-page article for the issue. Tooth and Nail Records, P.O.D., Zao, War of Ages, Still Remains, and He Is Legend were also mentioned. In 2018, Chamberlain stated that the band no longer identifies as Christian.

=== Thrash metal ===
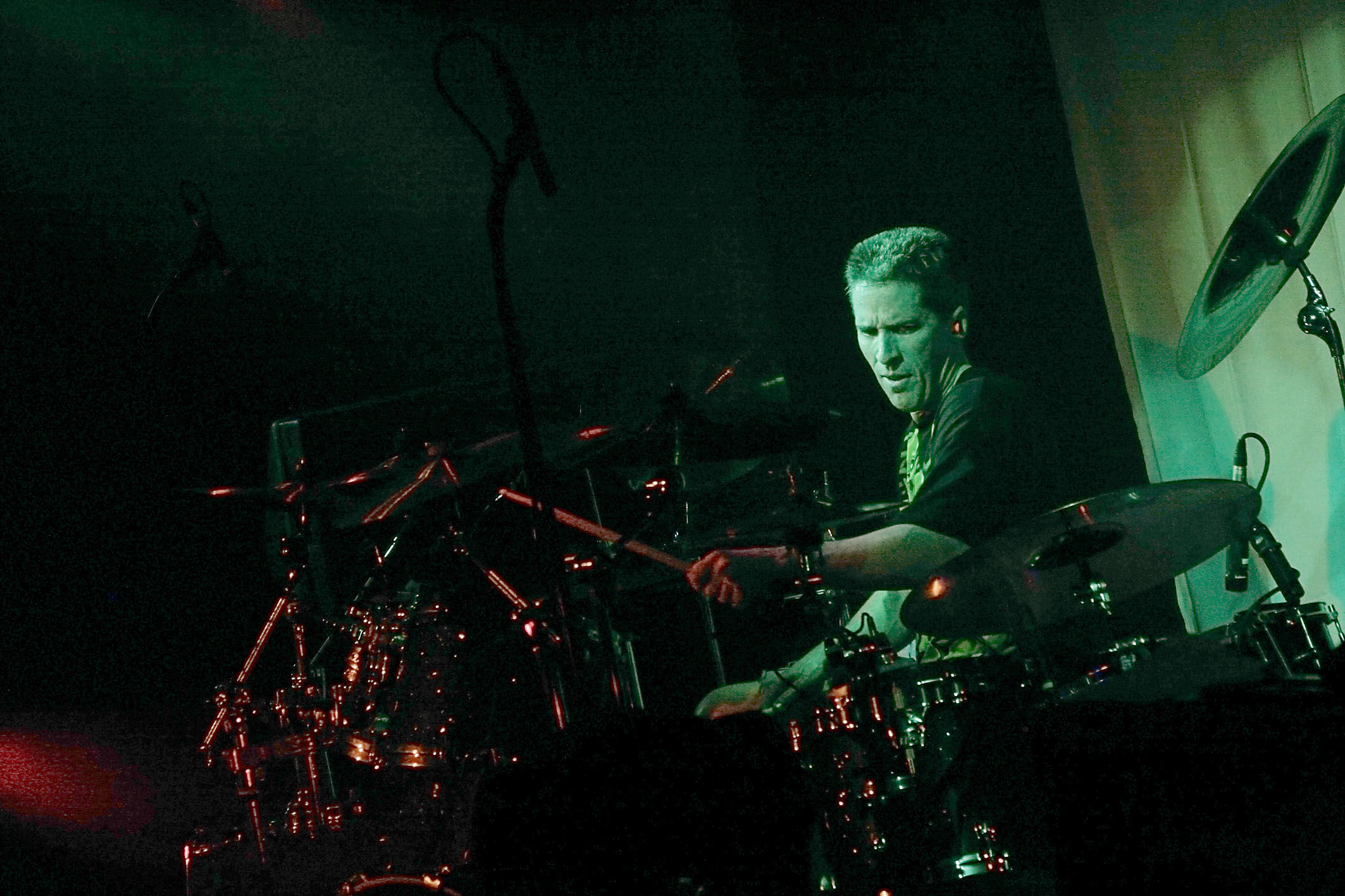
Drummer Ted Kirkpatrick of the American thrash metal band Tourniquet live in 2005

Some notable American Christian thrash metal groups include Deliverance, Believer, Vengeance (frontman, vocalist and last remaining member Roger Martinez currently against Christianity) and Tourniquet. Allmusic states that Vengeance Rising's first two albums "were huge successes in the world of Christian music, making them one of the few bands in the genre to cross over into the secular music scene." Tourniquet was called "arguably the greatest Christian metal band in history" by Cross Rhythms in 1996. Tourniquet's Psycho Surgery was ranked as the second most influential Christian metal album of all time by HM Magazine. Deliverance's 1990 music video for the title track of Weapons of Our Warfare album received some airplay on MTV. Allmusic wrote about Believer's Sanity Obscure album: "Before 1990, the Christian heavy metal genre rarely strayed from generic riffing and poor lyrics. Bands like Petra and Sacred Warrior never broke through to the mainstream for this very reason. With low expectations, Believer released this massive slab of molten metal. Although it never really became popular, several mainstream magazines praised the album."

The British bands Seventh Angel and Detritus introduced Christian thrash metal to Europe. Seventh Angel were considered to be thrash metal pioneers, and their albums achieved mainstream distribution through the Music for Nations label. Cross Rhythms states that for a long time Seventh Angel were considered to be the best metal act in the UK. Seventh Angel also has included aspects of doom metal on some recordings. In the 1990s, New Mexico based Ultimatum and Oklahoman group called Eternal Decision gained some attention, the latter with its thrash and groove metal style. The band's eponymous 1997 album hit the record stores in the U.S. and 16 other countries, achieving considerable acclaim and providing the band with even more notice.

=== Death metal ===
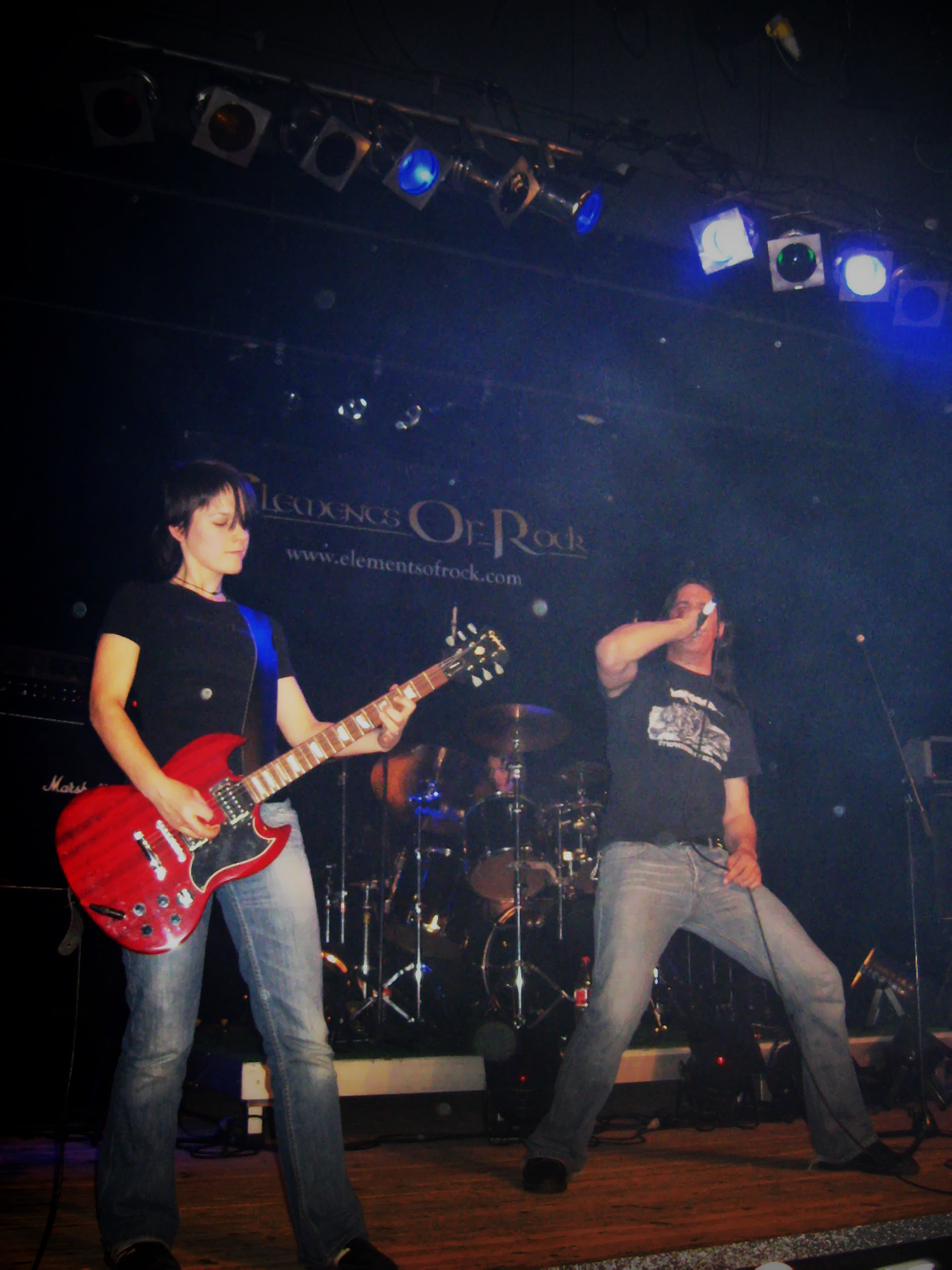
German death metal group Sacrificium live at Elements of Rock 2008, Switzerland

In the late 1980s and early to mid-1990s, Christian death metal bands also emerged. Incubus (later known as Opprobrium), formed in 1986 in Louisiana, United States by two brothers recently immigrated from Brazil, was Christian and in the late 1980s experimented with a death metal sound. Mortification and Vomitorial Corpulence, both from Melbourne, Australia, were the main progenitors of the Christian death metal. Mortification, was formed in 1990 out of Steve Rowe's previous band Lightforce, after Rowe decided to move in a heavier direction influenced by Morbid Angel and Napalm Death. The band's 1991 self-titled debut sonically featured a grindcore sound. By 1992, Mortification had moved to a deathgrind sound for that years' release, Scrolls of the Megilloth. This release proved particularly influential in the development of Christian death metal. With that album and the live video album Live Planetarium, both released in 1993, Mortification became not only the most successful and popular Christian death metal group but achieved success in the general market, becoming one of the best-selling heavy metal bands from Australia. The goregrind band Vomitorial Corpulence formed in 1992. The band debuted in 1995 with their album Karrionic Hacktician, released via the compilation album The Extreme Truth through Steve Rowe's Rowe Productions label. Skin Stripper, a 27-song collection of grindcore similar to early period Carcass, was released in 1999.

Roughly contemporary with Mortification and Vomitorial Corpulence, the bands Living Sacrifice and Crimson Thorn, from the United States, and Sympathy, from Canada emerged. Living Sacrifice formed in 1989 in Little Rock, Arkansas and was noted for its death metal sound and evangelical Christian lyrics. Heavily influenced by the Florida death metal scene, the band released three recordings in this vein — Living Sacrifice (1991), Nonexistent (1992), and Inhabit (1994). The debut release featured more of a thrash sound whereas the latter two were more death metal. The band then evolved to a different, more punk influenced, style in the late 1990s. As Living Sacrifice shifted direction in its musical style, two of the members, Lance Garvin and Rocky Gray, formed Soul Embraced in 1997 as a side-project to continue making death metal music. Crimson Thorn, formed in Minneapolis, is described by Eduardo Rivadavia of AllMusic as "surely one of the world's most extreme-sounding Christian metal bands." The band's second release, Dissection, released in 1997, was described by Rad Rockers as "the supreme perfection of Christian death metal." Sympathy began as a five-piece ensemble in 1991 but by 1995 was reduced to a solo project for the recording and release of Age of Darkness.

In the late 1990s and early 2000s, Norway's Extol, Finland's Immortal Souls and Deuteronomium, Sweden's Pantokrator, Germany's Sacrificium, Ukraine's Holy Blood, the United States' Embodyment, Feast Eternal, Possession, Aletheian, Becoming the Archetype, and Tortured Conscience, and Brazil's Antidemon all further developed the genre. In the latter half of the 2000s, Impending Doom (from the United States) and Blood Covenant (from India) joined the forefront of Christian death metal.

=== Unblack metal ===
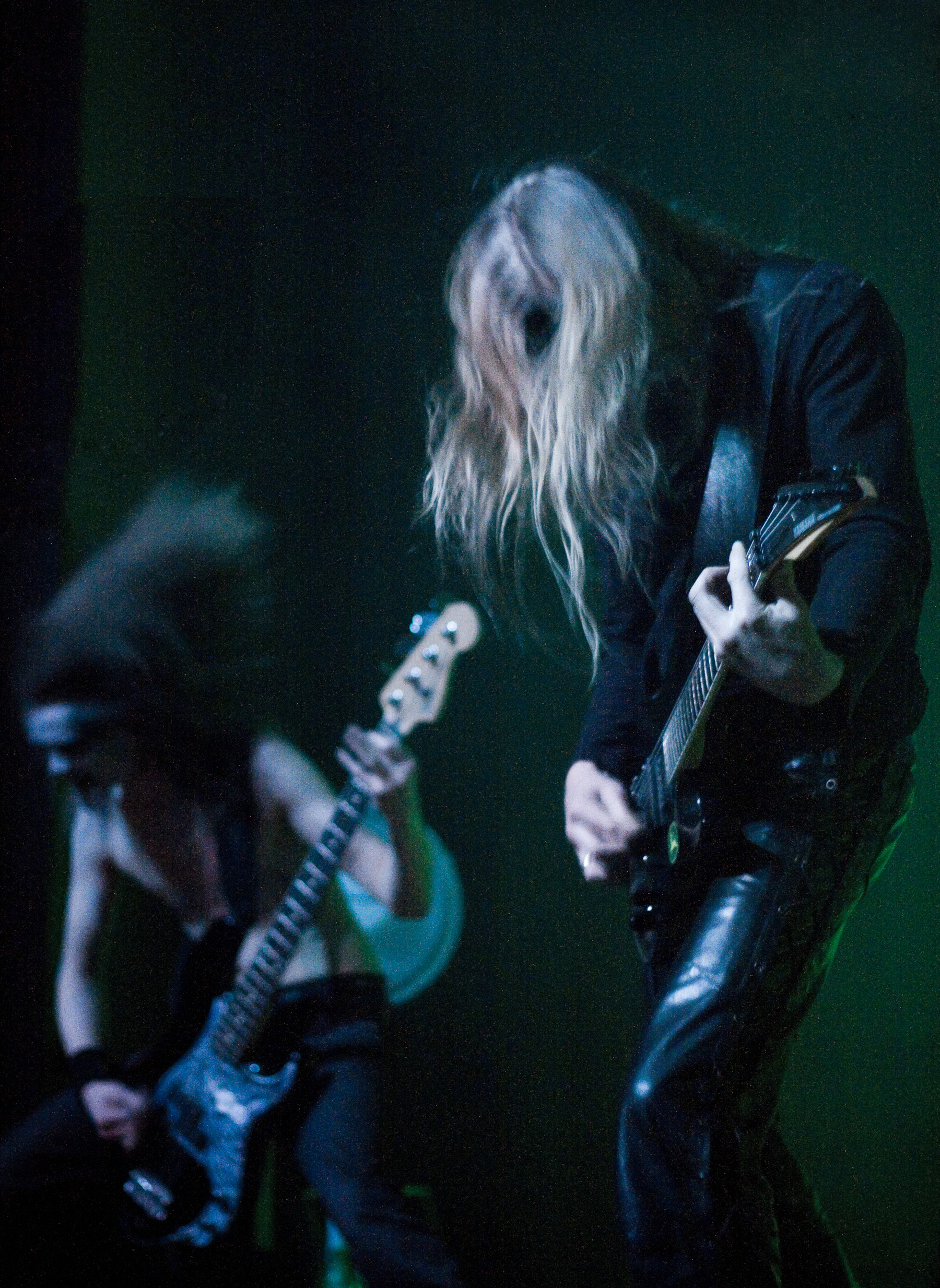
Norwegian unblack metal band Antestor in 2011 at Elements of Rock

Horde is widely considered to be the first unblack metal (also called Christian black metal) band. As a one-man band with only one release (in 1994), Horde initiated controversy within the extreme metal community, opposing the more common lyrical themes of Satanism and evil. The title of Horde's only release – Hellig Usvart – means "Holy Unblack", which is now often used by Christians to refer to Christian black metal, in order to avoid the negative connotations of the term "black metal".

Antestor (then called Crush Evil) existed prior to the release of Hellig Usvart but their music was a death/doom style, and was not yet musically considered black metal. During the early 1990s when the band was known as Crush Evil, Euronymous, guitarist for the seminal black metal band Mayhem, was planning to stop Crush Evil from continuing. However, this never took place.

The release of Antestor's The Return of the Black Death on the British black metal label Cacophonous Records in 1998 "set the standard for Christian black metal". Swedish Crimson Moonlight's The Covenant Progress, HM Magazine stated, "rivals the best any other band (Christian or secular) in this subgenre can offer." While the unblack scene is not part of the traditional black metal scene, several musicians from both have co-operated: Stian Aarstad of Dimmu Borgir produced Vaakevandring's eponymous EP, and Jan Axel Blomberg of Mayhem played drums for Antestor's The Forsaken (2005) album.

=== Power metal and progressive metal ===
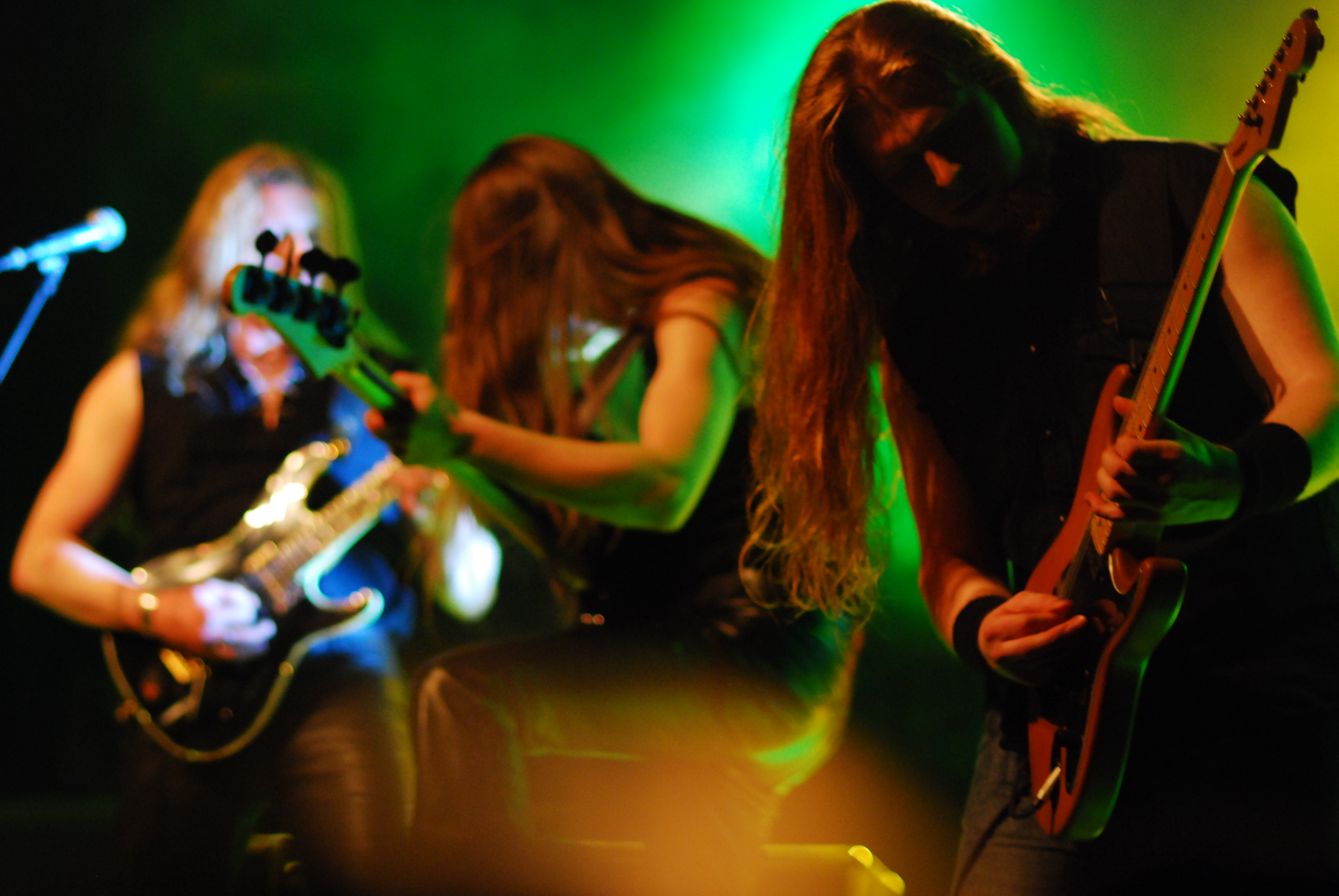
German power metal group Seventh Avenue

Sacred Warrior preceded Christian power metal in the United States. The German group Seventh Avenue, formed in 1989, was one of more notable Christian power metal bands in the 1990s. They released Rainbowland in 1995, and after that the band was signed to Treasure Hunt Records. Their first release on this label, Tales of Tales, topped at 18 on the Japanese Heavy Metal Charts.

Later in the 1990s, the Swedish group Narnia made contributions to Christian power metal history, having signed with Nuclear Blast Records, Germany, and Pony Canyon Records, Japan. Later there appeared more notable European groups such as the German bands Chrystyne and Lightmare, and the Swedish groups XT, Divinefire, Harmony, and Heartcry.

Among the progressive metal representatives were Balance of Power, whose album When the World Falls Down was picked by Japanese label Pony Canyon. Jacobs Dream was signed to Metal Blade Records. HM wrote of the Athens, Georgia based Theocracy's self-titled debut album that "Not only did this release gain [the then-sole member] Matt [Smith] a lot of notoriety in the small Christian power/prog scene but the much larger secular power/prog scene embraced this as well." Later turned to a full band, their sophomore 2008 album Mirror of Souls "defines excellence in current Christian metal."

=== Other ===
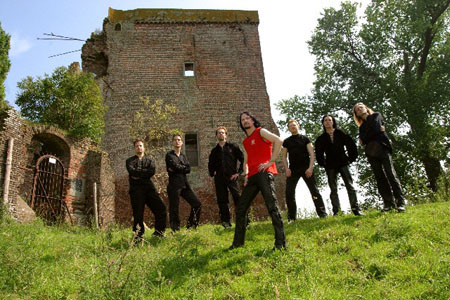
Dutch symphonic death/doom metal group Morphia

In 1987, the Swedish group Veni Domine started playing progressive and symphonic doom metal and released its first album Fall Babylon Fall in 1992, ranked as the 38th most influential Christian metal album of all time by HM. HM Magazine wrote that Paramaecium, with its 1993 album Exhumed of the Earth, "essentially delivered the most powerful and moving death/doom recording in the history of Christian metal." Saviour Machine's Saviour Machine I was called "amazing accomplishment" by HM and that "their gothic-tinged, progressive metal was quite unique to the scene when it was released in 1993."

The alternative metal style's leading groups included the nu metal bands P.O.D., Thousand Foot Krutch, Disciple, and Pillar. Zao was a pioneer of metalcore, paving way for bands such as Underoath and Norma Jean. The California-based group Mortal is cited as one of the first Christian bands that represented the industrial metal style. Cross Rhythms wrote that when Mortal's second album Fathom hit the scene in 1993 "there was nothing else quite like it" and that it is "truly a musical milestone."

Another 1990s reputive Christian industrial metal band was Circle of Dust. The band received MTV exposure with a music video for "Telltale Crime", and a part of the song "Deviate" was used as the intro-song for a long time in the now defunct MTV Sports show.

Argyle Park, an underground supergroup of Christian industrial metal, received some success with the album Misguided (1995) as did, to some extent, LVL and Klank with Still Suffering in 1997. Klank's second album Numb was somewhat successful because the song "Blind" became a hit single. The Australian industrial metal band called Screams of Chaos was known for its bizarre style that combined several extreme metal influences with industrial. The late 1990s and early first decade of the 21st century popular American shock rock group Rackets & Drapes was known to have elements of industrial metal, and received a following.

The Australian group Vomitorial Corpulence is credited as the first Christian band to perform goregrind. Heaven's Metal writer Lloyd Harp stated that Christian grindcore has obstacles from both the Christian and non-Christian markets. Christians often reject it because of its sonic brutality, and non-Christians shun the scene because it does not emphasize gore, violence, and pornography.

== In mainstream metal ==
There are notable mainstream acts that feature or have featured Christian members. While these bands may or may not have had lyrics using Christian themes or symbolism, some have caused controversy in their claims to Christianity, such as Tom Araya of Slayer. Other mainstream acts featuring Christian members include Alice Cooper, Killswitch Engage, Iron Maiden, and Megadeth.

== Evangelistic subculture ==
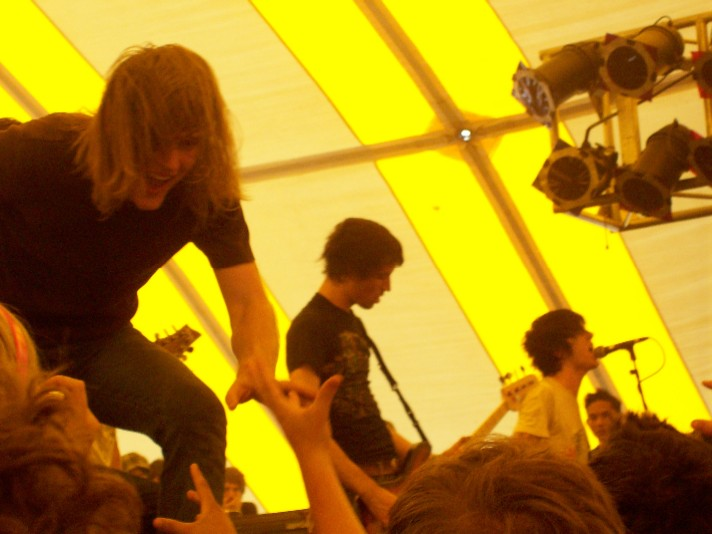
The Devil Wears Prada performing at Cornerstone Festival, a world-famous Christian music event

While not uncommon in predominantly Catholic cultures, Christian metal is rooted in evangelical Protestantism, beginning as a means of evangelism among the non-Christian metal scene. Over the years, the focus changed because of the increased secularization of Christianity in the West during the 1990s. Moberg (2008) notes that the current scene seems to have very little interest in evangelism, especially in Northern Europe. Instead, it is argued that the current Christian metal music scene ultimately provides its core members with important resources for the shaping of an alternative and complementary form of religious expression and practice and an alternative Christian identity. Thus, Moberg states that Christian metal serves four main purposes: as an alternative form of religious expression and identity; as a legitimate form of religious expression; as an effective means of evangelism and fighting and standing up for the Christian faith; and as a positive alternative to non-Christian metal.

In a 2006 interview with HM Magazine, Steve Rowe of Mortification, one of the best known figures in the scene, implied that evangelism is of secondary importance and that Christian metal should first and foremost bring "spiritual encouragement" for its Christian listeners. Moberg (2006) suspects that Christian metal music may suggest dissatisfaction with traditional forms of worship among today's young Christians: "They may not feel comfortable with just going to church and singing hymns, they need an alternative means to express the same faith." Apart from evangelism, Christian metal may also provide a means "to get away from the image of Christianity as something rigid and boring".

Luhr (2009) states that Christian metal expresses feeling of isolation and rebellion just like non-Christian metal - but in a completely different way. Christian metal's rebellion is about "Christian opposition to the perceived sinfulness and immorality of a late modern society and culture in which traditional family values have been eroded through such things as the legalization and increasing acceptability of abortion and pornography and the rise of gay rights and feminist movements." Causes for the feeling of isolation can be explained with the fundamental Christian struggle of being in the world but not of it. Bloodgood and Barren Cross inverted the meaning of rebellion by declaring that in Western society and culture the Christian faith is true rebellion. As in non-Christian metal, fans are encouraged to stand up for their faith, think for themselves and not blindly follow authorities, including religious ones.

According to Moberg (2008), Christian metal has developed scenes in countries with long-standing metal subcultures: United States, Brazil, Mexico, Germany, Netherlands, Norway, Sweden and Finland. Despite its seemingly marginal niche audience, as Christian metal fans are counted in the thousands and the non-Christian metal fans in the millions, the Christian metal scene is one of the few transnational Christian communities that do not have any leaders or creed - only music connects its attendees. Just like non-Christian metal, the Christian metal scene has developed its own infrastructure of record labels, promotion and distribution channels, specialized media, discussion forums, attitude, rhetorics, slogans such as "Turn or Burn!", "Faster for the Master!" and "Support the War against Satan!", as well as webstores and festivals. Brazil and Mexico have tiny parishes of Christian metal fans. Finland in particular, with metal being more mainstream there than anywhere in the world, has held popular Metal Masses picked up by the Lutheran former state church since 2006.

Most Christian metalheads also listen to non-Christian metal; Christian metal merely offers counterbalance for the dark message of non-Christian metal, and most Christian metalheads only avoid the most satanic bands, if even them, since some ignore the issue altogether. Some differences in concert gestures have been noticed: Los Angeles Times reported in 1985 that in Stryper shows the audience were seen "poking stubby 'one way' fingers heavenward—a refutation of the double-fingered devil horns salute of many metal groups".

== Controversy ==
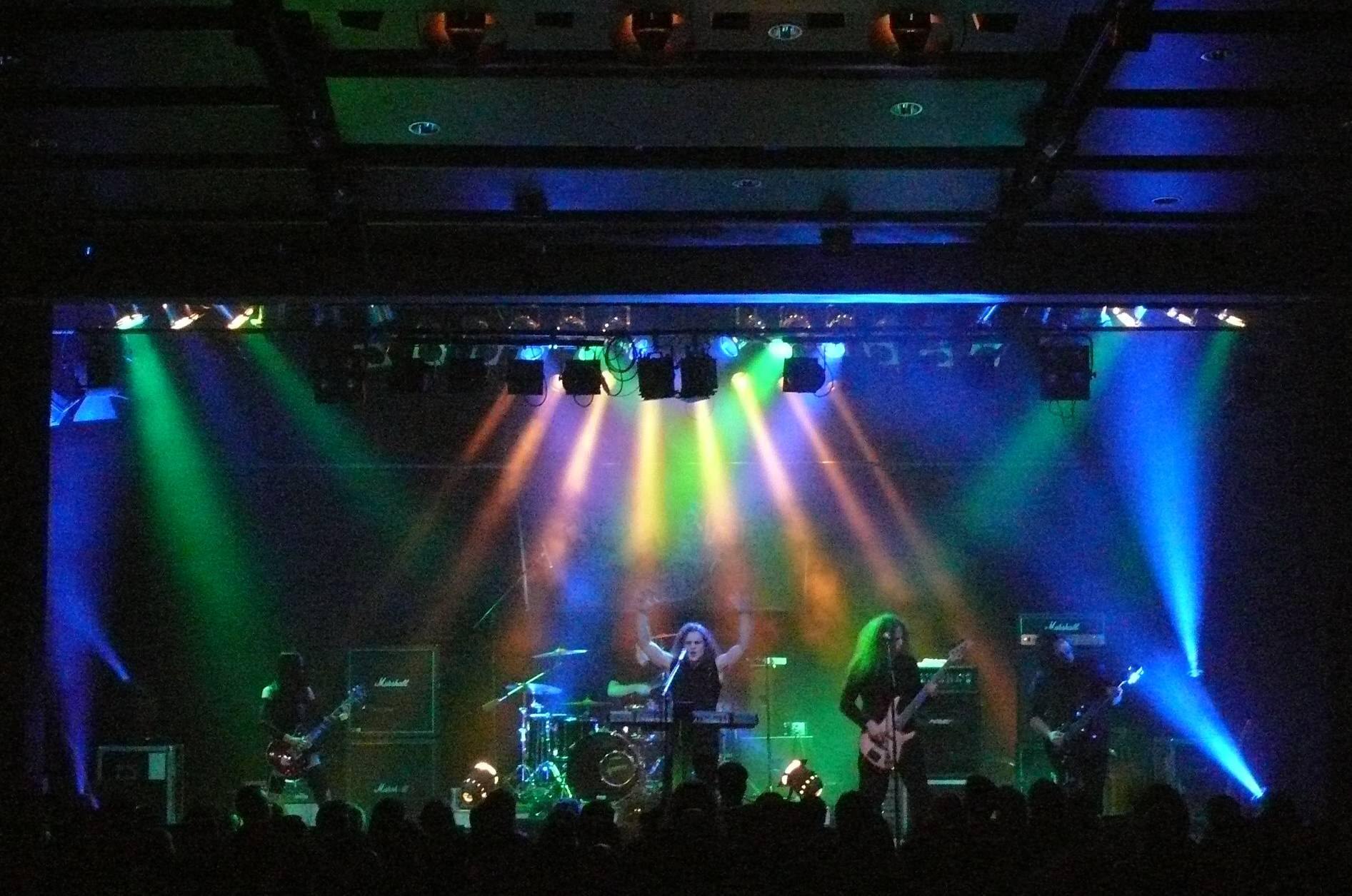
Australian gothic metal band Virgin Black attempts to highlight the difference between the Church and the spiritual aspects of Christianity.

Certain Christian groups, most notably those in some King James Only denominations, consider all types of rock and metal music to be opposition to their faith, regardless of lyrical content or the lifestyles of the band members. However, fans and artists see metal as another genre of music, parallel to such genres as blues, classical, jazz, punk, and hip-hop. Bands such as Showbread and Antestor believe that the instrumentation of the music is simply a medium of art, while the person creating the music as well as the lyrics being presented provide the message. Therefore, Christian metal is created when Christians compose metal music in a way that reflects their faith in Christ.

Keith Kahn-Harris, an English scholar of metal, states in the book Extreme Metal that sometimes fans of metal consider Christian faith and adherence in Church a membership of an established authority, and therefore Christian metal bands are seen as "posers" and the use of Christian lyrics to be opposed to the "true" purpose of metal, which values individualism and ignoring the opinions or rejection of religion.

Christian metal groups such as Barnabas and Extol have criticized bands within the industry for a lack of innovation and isolating other bands. Pastor Bob Beeman of Sanctuary International stated that this is a compliment to secular music, as it lets people to listen to the music they enjoyed without feeling like they are giving up on the style they love and allows bands to crossover into mainstream success.

== Christian metal radio ==
Christian metal is very much a counterculture of the Christian music scene. It has never had any major corporate radio outlets, in contrast with the more accepted CCM-associated Christian music formats. Nevertheless, it has remained culturally significant in the genre, primarily enduring the test of time through word of mouth and through the help of pioneering Christian rock and metal broadcasters. Despite the lack of commercial radio support, Christian metal broadcasters have managed to hit the airwaves on public radio, campus radio, Internet radio, and in recent years through podcasting via the Internet. As digital broadcasting technology becomes more accessible, the number of Christian metal broadcasters has steadily increased. Some of today's largest non-commercial Christian alternative radio stations such as RadioU, Call FM, and Effect Radio have some Christian metal programing late nights and on weekends. However, as a whole these larger stations generally maintain a format prescribed by the Gospel Music Association. Other stations such as Almighty Metal Radio, Savage Rock Radio, Reign Radio, Metal Blessing Radio, The Cross Stream, The Refinery Rock Radio, www.theBlast.fm, and FuelRadio.FM have been able to maintain twenty-four-hour Christian metal formats through Internet radio. In September 2011 The Refinery Rock Radio became Dead to Self Radio and in November 2016 FuelRadio.FM changed to FuelRadio.net. Dead to Self Radio and Fuel Radio are owned by Thomas Johns. Some notable Christian metal radio DJs, shows and podcasts include: Jesus Solid Rock ('74–'80) hosted by Pastor Bob Beeman, Intense Radio ('95–present) founded by Pastor Bob Beeman and Sanctuary International, HM Podcast with HM Magazine founder & publisher Doug Van Pelt, The Full Armor of God Broadcast ('97–present) hosted by Bro Scotland Kubinski (Kuba "The Demon Slayer"), Radio U Hardcore and ('02–present) hosted by Jaddeus Dempsey (a.k.a. "Jad"), and The Nation of Rockwell.

== See also ==
- Christian rock
- Heavy metal music
- Jesus movement
- List of Christian metal artists
- Unblack metal
- Hell's Bells: The Dangers of Rock 'N' Roll
