= Daniel Band =

Canadian Christian metal band

- Origin: Toronto, Ontario, Canada
- Genres: Christian metal, Christian rock
- Years active: 1979–present
- Labels: Streetlight, Lamb & Lion, Benson, Refuge, Lexicon-Spectra, Magdalene/M8, Retroactive
- Members: Tony Rossi; Dan McCabe; Frank Catrambone
- Past members: Peter Cosman; Bill Findlay; Matt Del Duca; Wayne Morgan; Bill Davidson; Stu Christie

Daniel Band is a Canadian Christian metal group formed in 1979 in Toronto. They played in the contemporary Christian music industry with a sound that ranged from hard rock to heavy metal.

== History ==
The group originated in 1979 in suburban Toronto, Ontario, and were based out of a Brethren Assembly in Scarborough, Ontario called Bendale Bible Chapel. In its basement, the chapel held a weekly coffeehouse, The One Way Inn, that featured Christian rock groups.

The band placed as a top three finalist in the 1982 Homegrown concert sponsored by Toronto radio station Q107, and played at the El Mocambo with the champion, Oliver Heavyside, and runner-up, The Cameo Blues Band, both longtime professional bar bands on the Toronto scene.

Their first album, On Rock (1982), offered a progressive rock sound that was typical of the era, in the tradition of April Wine and Boston, but with a harder edge. The solid rock guitar and high register vocals reminded fans of the Canadian rock group Rush. Their sound grew heavier with Straight Ahead (1983), laying down classic rock tracks in the vein of the Canadian rock group Triumph with then current era elements of Scorpions, Iron Maiden, and The Police. With their third album Run from the Darkness (1984) more prominent keyboards were added to the guitars with a sound that was closer to Canadian rock group Loverboy. As such as a heavy metal act it came with all the trappings. This was their spandex and studded dog collar stage. Their fourth album Rise Up was their heaviest metal oriented album but did contain the ballad Right Heart reminiscent of their first album's melodic Spiritual Game.

The band has never officially broken up, although a "farewell concert" was held in Toronto in April 1988, and its members have been involved with various projects in Churches, including Bendale, and Schools where the members now live. Tony Rossi released a blues based album on R.E.X. Records in 1990. Dan McCabe was involved with a band called Dreamer which released one album in 1991 titled Full Metal Racket, released a solo CD and played with his older children in a band called Nine-O-Five.

In 2000, Daniel Band played at the Cornerstone Festival in Illinois where the listed Live at Cornerstone CD was recorded.

In November 2006, Daniel Band was featured as the opening group for Audio Adrenaline's farewell tour concert in Toronto, along with Geoff Moore. Earlier in the year, there were two appearances in Sarnia, including an August festival that also saw a reunion of a local (Arkona, Ontario) group named Elim Hall, who were contemporaries of Daniel Band in the mid-1980s, and Glenn Kaiser Band (featuring two members of Resurrection Band).

In 2007, the band played at a May celebration of the One Way Inn's (now a drop-in) 35th Anniversary and the 50th Anniversary of Bendale Bible Chapel, and Freedom Festival Canada in Oro-Medonte, Ontario during August. They also played a show in Ajax in February 2009 with Glenn Kaiser opening, and in May 2009, again at Bendale. In July 2010, the band travelled to Chibougamau, Quebec.

In October 2011, the band was awarded the GMA Canada Lifetime Achievement Award recognizing their pioneering influence on Christian rock. Earlier in the year, they played with X-Sinner over a Spring weekend in Southern Ontario (at Toronto's El Mocambo, St. Catharines, Ottawa, and Kitchener).

== Band members ==
- Tony Rossi (lead guitar, vocals)
- Dan McCabe (lead vocals, bass)
- Bill Findlay (guitar, keyboards, vocals) (to 1987)
- Peter Cosman (to 1982),
- Matt Del Duca (drums) (to 1987)
- Wayne Morgan (bass, vocals) (to 1991)
- Bill Davidson (bass)
- Stu Christie (drums)

== Discography ==
=== Studio albums ===
- On Rock - 1982 Released on Streetlight in Canada and Lamb & Lion/Benson in the US.
- Straight Ahead - 1983 Released on Streetlight in Canada and Refuge Records/Benson in the US.
- Run from the Darkness – 1984 Released on Streetlight in Canada and Refuge/Benson in the US.
- Rise Up - 1986 Released on Refuge in the US.
- Running Out of Time - 1987 Released on Refuge/Lexicon-Spectra in the US.

=== Live albums ===
- Live at Cornerstone - 2001 (limited edition) Released on Magdalene/M8 in the US.

=== Compilations ===
- Best of Daniel Band - 1993 Released on Refuge-Alternative in the US.

=== Re-releases ===
- On Rock - 2001 (2 CD limited edition) Released on Magdalene/M8 in the US.
- Rise Up / Running Out Of Time - 2003 Released on Retroactive in the US.
- Straight Ahead / Run From The Darkness - 2003 Released on Retroactive in the US.
- Straight Ahead - 2006 Released on Retroactive in the US.(includes two bonus tracks)
- Run from Darkness - 2006 Released on Retroactive in the US. (enhanced CD which includes the video of 'Walk on the Water" and two unreleased bonus tracks)
- On Rock (Collector's Edition) - 2010 Released on Retroactive in the US.
- Rise Up (25th ANNIVERSARY EDITION) - 2012 Released on Retroactive in the US. (includes one bonus track) Remastered
- Running out of Time - 2012 Released on Retroactive in the US. (includes one bonus track) Remastered

=== Songs on compilations ===
- Heavy Righteous Metal, "Black or White" (Pure Metal, 1988)
- History of Canadian Christian New Music, "Run from the Darkness" (2000)
- GMA Canada presents 30th Anniversary Collection, "He's the Creator" (CMC, 2008)
