= Ghost Ship (Theocracy album) =

Studio album by Theocracy
- Released: October 28, 2016
- Recorded: 2015–2016
- Genre: Christian metal, progressive metal, power metal
- Length: 54:31
- Label: Ulterium
- Producer: Matt Smith

Theocracy chronology
As the World Bleeds (2011)	Ghost Ship (2016)	Mosaic (2023)

Professional ratings
Review scores
Source	Rating
Dead Rhetoric	9/10
Jesus Freak Hideout	5/5

Ghost Ship is the fourth studio album by Christian progressive power metal band Theocracy. It was released by Ulterium Records on October 28, 2016, in North America. A music video was released for the title track.

== Composition ==
Frontman Matt Smith has explained that the title track "was really inspired by conversations that we were having with people after shows. We met so many kids. You could tell that they were looking for a place to fit in", whereas "'Castaway' is a song about doing the right thing, regardless of consequences, even when you lose so-called friends for standing up for something you believe in; 'Currency In a Bankrupt World' is basically an anti-suicide song; Ghost Ship carries this theme of encouragement and lifting people. If there’s any recurring thread on the album, its that."

In terms of which songs were the most challenging written for the album, Smith stated, "I guess “Easter” was the challenge, because that is the big epic- it’s my favorite song on the album. As epic songs tend to be, they take quite a while to develop and put together. It came in sections and I lived with it over quite a long period of time to make sure everything flowed from one part to the other. That was probably the hardest – “Paper Tiger” was the last one we finished, I had the skeleton of the song, the riffs, some of the verses and the chorus but I didn’t know what else we wanted to do so I was kind of kicking that one back and forth with Jon (Hinds) and Val (Allen Wood), contributing our little parts to finish the song."

== Track listing ==
All songs written and composed by Matt Smith, except where noted.

No.	Title	Music	Length
1.	"Paper Tiger"	M. Smith, J. Hinds	5:13
2.	"Ghost Ship"		4:39
3.	"The Wonder of It All"	M. Smith, V. A. Wood, J. Hinds	6:38
4.	"Wishing Well"		5:01
5.	"Around the World and Back"		4:57
6.	"Stir the Embers"		4:07
7.	"A Call to Arms"		4:39
8.	"Currency in a Bankrupt World"		4:41
9.	"Castaway"		4:43
10.	"Easter"		9:53
Total length:			54:31

== Personnel ==
- Matt Smith – lead vocals, additional guitars, keyboards, orchestration
- Val Allen Wood – guitars
- Jonathan Hinds – guitars, backing vocals
- Jared Oldham – bass
- Shawn Benson – drums (session member)
