= Messiah Prophet =

- Origin: Pennsylvania, U.S.
- Genres: Christian metal, Christian rock
- Years active: 1978–1988 1995-1996
- Labels: Morada; Pure Metal; Starsong; UCan

Messiah Prophet was a pioneering band in Christian metal, releasing two albums in the mid eighties and one more with a different lineup in 1996.

== History ==
Messiah Prophet Band was formed in the late seventies by Dean Pellman and Gil Tabor as an acoustic duo performing cover songs in Pennsylvania. It had developed into a full band by 1983 with Charlie Clark singing, Andy Strauss and Rob Clark playing guitar, Dave Daubert on drums and Pellham on bass guitar. In 1984, a small Nashville label called Morada Records signed both Messiah Prophet Band and Saint, another band destined to leave a lasting mark on the fledgling Christian metal scene.

They recorded their debut album, Rock The Flock in the spring of 1984. Jack Althouse, a local artist and friend of Pellman was commissioned to paint the iconic cover. Shortly after the recording was finished, guitarist Rob Clark left the band. They played small regional shows in support of the album.

In 1986, the band became the first artist signed to new label Pure Metal Records, a subsidiary of the Refuge Music Group. They shortened their name to Messiah Prophet and recorded Master of the Metal in 1986. Dave Daubert left the band prior to going into the studio for this release. David "Thunder" Armstrong was brought on board to record the title track "Master of the Metal". During the recording of the rest of the album, Pellman left the band and was replaced with bassist Joe Shirk. Brian Nicarry was also hired to play rhythm guitar. Shirk and Nicarry previously played together in a local band. A much larger cross-country touring schedule followed, after the release of Master of the Metal. Jack Althouse was commissioned once again for the cover art, this time employing a traditional large-format oil approach in the style of local Pennsylvania legend Frank Frazetta.

In early 1987 the band took a short break from the road to begin writing for their third album tentatively titled Metal Messiah. They hit the road again, playing some of the new songs in shows in the Midwest and on the East Coast. In late 1987, Strauss and Nicarry left the band taking the new material with them. Messiah Prophet recruited Frank Caloiaro and Mark Zimmerman to finish the tour.

In early 1988, Charlie Clark and Ray Fletcher formed a new version of Messiah Prophet with lead guitarist Todd Bergren, drummer CT Cash, bassist Scott Gunther and guitarist Mike Balleitt and begin writing more songs for an album with the working title of Living On The Edge. The band was also rehearsing for an upcoming string of shows opening for Barren Cross on their Atomic Arena tour. By mid 1988 Refuge was in financial trouble and could not afford to get the band into the studio for its next release. Refuge started negotiations with Starsong to buy the Pure Metal label. This deal was completed in 1990. Charlie Clark then recorded a new song called "Blinded" with unknown musicians, which was released on the StarSong compilation Ultimate Metal.

In 1995 a new Messiah Prophet lineup was being planned by executive producer Ray Fletcher, who owned the rights to the name. Most of the former members were not available, with the exception of vocalist Charlie Clark and touring guitarist Frank Caloiaro. Caloiaro recruited brothers Shane and Sean Regal on guitar and bass respectively and Joe Schrum on drums and began writing material.

Clark was brought in after a number of songs were written. Stylistically, the new material was too bland, pop-oriented and sedate for Clarks powerhouse vocals, so he bowed out. They got Dave Grimm to replace him. Grimm was in a serious motorcycle accident two weeks before recording, so they found Mike Raite, who had previously played with Shane Regal in the band King of Hearts, and the album Colors was the result. Colors was a completely different style and had no members who had recorded with the band previously. It was panned by the press—and—poorly received by fans and after just a handful of shows, Messiah Prophet disbanded for the final time.

In 2003, German based label Shark Records put two Messiah Prophet songs, "Hit and Run" and "Heavy Metal Thunder", on a split album with Powerlord and Maxx Warrior under its Rusty Diamonds imprint.

== Original Rock the Flock members ==
- Gil Tabor (vocals 1978–1981)
- Dean Pellman (guitars, bass 1978–1986)
- Charlie Clark (vocals 1981–1995)
- Andy Strauss (guitars 1982–1987)
- Dave Daubert (drums 1982–1985)
- Rob Clark (guitars 1982–1984)

== Master of the Metal members ==
- Dean Pellman (guitars, bass 1978–1986)
- Charlie Clark (vocals 1981–1995)
- Andy Strauss (guitars 1982–1987)
- David "Thunder" Armstrong (drums 1985–1988)
- Brian Nicarry (guitars 1986–1987)
- Joe Shirk (bass 1986–1988)

== Colors members ==
- Frank Caloiaro (guitars 1987–1996)
- Dave Grimm (vocals 1995–1996)
- Mike Raite (vocals 1995)
- Todd Bergren (guitars 1988)
- Mike Balleitt (guitars 1988)
- CT Cash (drums 1988)
- Scott Gunther (bass 1988)

== Discography ==
=== Studio albums ===
- Rock the Flock – 1984 Morada Records, Jim Zimmerman producer, Cedric Winter engineer, executive producer Ray Fletcher
- Master of the Metal – 1986 Pure Metal Records, Bill Grabowski producer, executive producer Ray Fletcher
- Colors – 1996 UCan Records, executive producer Ray Fletcher

=== Songs on compilations ===
- Righteous Metal – 1987 "Master of the Metal" – Arrival, a sub-label to K-Tel
- Heavy Righteous Metal – 1988 "Heavy Metal Thunder" – Pure Metal Records
- Ultimate Metal – 1992 "Blinded" Star Song SSD 8141
- Heaven's Metal, Volume 1 – 1992 "Heavy Metal Thunder" – Pure Metal Records
- Powerlord/Messiah Prophet/Maxx Warrior Split album – 2003 "Heavy Metal Thunder" and "Hit and Run", Rusty Diamond
