= Mirror of Souls =

Studio album by Theocracy
- Released: November 21, 2008
- Recorded: 2007–2008
- Genre: Christian metal, progressive metal, power metal
- Length: 67:57
- Label: Ulterium

Theocracy chronology
| Theocracy (2003) | Mirror of Souls (2008) | As the World Bleeds (2011) |

Mirror of Souls is the second album by Christian progressive/power metal band Theocracy. It was released by Ulterium Records on November 21, 2008 in Europe, November 26 in Japan, and December 9 in North America. It is Theocracy's first album as a full band, as their self-titled debut album was a one-man project by current lead vocalist Matt Smith. In Finland it was album of the week at Imperiumi website which called the album "clearly one of the best melodic power metal albums of the year". In 2010, HM Magazine ranked it #16 on the Top 100 Christian metal albums of all time list.

== Track listing ==
All tracks are written by Matt Smith, except where noted.

| No. | Title | Writer(s) | Length |
|---|---|---|---|
| 1. | "A Tower of Ashes" | | 4:44 |
| 2. | "On Eagles Wings" | | 4:11 |
| 3. | "Laying the Demon to Rest" | | 9:37 |
| 4. | "Bethlehem" | | 5:51 |
| 5. | "Absolution Day" | Matt Smith; Jonathan Hinds; Shawn Benson | 6:46 |
| 6. | "The Writing in the Sand" | Matt Smith; Shawn Benson | 6:43 |
| 7. | "Martyr" | | 7:39 |
| 8. | "Mirror of Souls"; I. "The House of Mirrors"; II. "The Stranger in the Storm"; III. "The Truth Revealed" | | 22:26; 7:15; 7:38; 7:34 |
| Total length: | | | 67:57 |

Japanese and limited deluxe edition bonus track
| No. | Title | Length |
|---|---|---|
| 9. | "Wages of Sin" | 3:25 |
| Total length: | | 71:22 |

== Personnel ==
- Matt Smith - lead vocals, guitar, bass, keyboards
- Jonathan Hinds - guitar, backing vocals
- Shawn Benson - drums, backing vocals
