= X-Sinner =

American hard rock band

- Origin: Orange County, California, United States
- Genres: Metal, Christian metal, hard rock
- Years active: 1988–2001, 2005–present
- Labels: Pakaderm, Millennium 8, Image
- Website: www.facebook.com/p/X-Sinner-100063537378157/

X-Sinner is an American hard rock band formed in 1988 by guitarist Greg Bishop. The band is known for having a very similar sound to that of Cinderella, Kix, and Def Leppard. Originating in the white metal scene, the band has expanded their fan base into mainstream metal over the years. They were named the favorite new band of 1989 by the readers of HM Magazine. Their first two albums were produced by John Elefante, former lead singer of Kansas. The albums were released on Pakaderm Records and A&M Records. After the release of their fifth studio album, A World Covered in Blood, the band toured Europe, and performed in the U.S. and Canada. In addition to their concerts and festival appearances, they have opened for such metal bands as Starship, Warrant, and Paul Dianno. The band performed live with members of Rex Scott's side project GX, and added that material to their live repertoire.

Originally announced in 2010, X-Sinner announced an upcoming new album called Goin' Out with a Bang. In 2024, the band significantly updated their Facebook page, announcing that the album was almost done, updating the release year to 2025. They also posted a teaser to their first song from the album, 'World On Fire'.

== Members ==
=== Current members ===
- Rex Scott – lead vocals, guitar
- Greg Bishop – lead guitar
- Glenn Thomas – studio bass
- Jason Ellesworth– live bass
- Tommy Bozung – live drums

=== Former members ===
- David Robbins – vocals (Get It)
- Rob Kniep - bass (Get It, Peace Treaty)
- Mike Buckner – live drums (1989–2013, Peace Treaty)

== Discography ==
- 1989: Get It (A&M/Pakaderm/Word)
- 1991: Peace Treaty (Pakaderm/Word)
- 2001: Loud and Proud (M8/Magdalen)
- 2003: X-Sinner presents the Angry Einsteins: Cracked (Retroactive)
- 2006: Fire It Up (Retroactive)
- 2007: Loud and Proud 2.0 (Retroactive)
- 2009: World Covered in Blood (Image)
- 2025: Goin' Out with a Bang
