= Hell's Belles (disambiguation) =

Hell's Belles are a fictional super villain team in the Marvel Comics Universe, composed of female mutant terrorists.

Hell's Belles may also refer to:

- Hell's Belles (film), a 1969 biker film
- HellsBelles, a British heavy metal band
- Hell's Belles (band), an all-female AC/DC cover band, originally from Seattle, Washington
- Hell’s Belles, a 2024 Helluva Boss short

== See also ==
- Hell's Bells (disambiguation)
