= Krigsman (Warrior) =

Studio album by Jerusalem
- Released: 1981
- Recorded: Supreme Studio, Stockholm, Sweden
- Genre: Hard rock, rock
- Length: 49:21
- Label: Prim, Lamb & Lion, Word
- Producer: Andy Kidd

Jerusalem chronology
Volym 2 (Volume 2) (1980)	Krigsman (Warrior) (1981)	Vi Kan Inte Stoppas (Can't Stop Us Now) (1983)

Alternative cover
- English album cover

Krigsman (Warrior) is the third album by the Swedish hard rock band Jerusalem, released in 1981. The Swedish version was released on Prim Records. The English version was released 1982 on Lamb & Lion Records in the United States and on Word Records in the UK. It was released after two North American tours, opening for Resurrection Band and then Larry Norman, and reached No. 1 on Christian music charts.

== Track listing ==
All songs by Ulf Christiansson.

Swedish version

1. "Ständig förändring"
2. "Krigsman"
3. "Du är"
4. "It's Mad"
5. "Moderne man"
6. "Sodom"
7. "Domedagsprofeter"
8. "Farväl"

English version

1. "Constantly Changing"
2. "Warrior"
3. "Pilgrim"
4. "It's Mad"
5. "Man of the World"
6. "Sodom"
7. "Ashes in Our Hands"
8. "Farewell"

== Personnel ==
- Ulf Christiansson - lead vocals, guitar
- Anders Mossberg - bass guitar (Peter Carlsohn is credited on the Swedish version)
- Dan Tibell - keyboards
- Klas Anderhell - drums
