= Vi Kan Inte Stoppas (Can't Stop Us Now) =

Studio album by Jerusalem
- Released: 1983
- Recorded: May – September 1983
- Studio: Secret Studio, Belfast, Northern Ireland
- Genre: Rock
- Length: 41:58
- Label: Royal Music
- Producer: Andy Kidd

Jerusalem chronology
Krigsman (Warrior) (1981)	Vi Kan Inte Stoppas (Can't Stop Us Now) (1983)	In His Majesty's Service – Live in USA (1985)

Alternative cover
- English album cover

Vi Kan Inte Stoppas (Can't Stop Us Now) is the fourth album by the Swedish hard rock band Jerusalem, released in 1983. The Swedish version was released on Royal Music. The English version was released in 1984 on Refuge Records in the United States.

== Track listing ==
All songs by Ulf Christiansson.

=== Swedish version ===
1. "Vi kan inte stoppas"
2. "Loves You More"
3. "Vinden blåser..."
4. "I skuggan av det förflutna"
5. "Kärlekseld"
6. "Let's Go (Dancin')"
7. "Sorgsnas parad"
8. "Regn"
9. "Pusselbiten"
10. "Heartbeat"

=== English version ===
1. "Can't Stop Us Now"
2. "Loves You More"
3. "The Wind is Blowing"
4. "Tomorrow's World"
5. "The Waiting"
6. "Let's Go (Dancin')"
7. "Mourner's Parade"
8. "Read Between the Lines"
9. "The Missing Piece"
10. "Heartbeat"

== Personnel ==
- Ulf Christiansson – lead vocals, guitar
- Mikael Ulvsgärd – drums
- Peter Carlsohn – bass guitar
- Dan Tibell – keyboards
