= Prophet (Jerusalem album) =

Studio album by Jerusalem
- Released: 1994
- Recorded: Studio Kuling, Örebro, Sweden
- Genre: Hard rock Rock
- Length: 1:05:04
- Label: Viva Records
- Producer: Jerusalem

Jerusalem chronology
Klassiker 2 (Classics 2) (1993)	Prophet (1994)	Classics 3 (1995)

Prophet is the sixth studio album, and the tenth album overall, by Swedish hard rock band Jerusalem. It was released simultaneously by Viva Records in Europe, R.E.X. Records in North America, and X ZERO Corporation in Japan.

== Track listing ==
All music by Jerusalem, lyrics by Ulf Christiansson.

1. "City on Fire"
2. "Risen"
3. "The Waiting Zone"
4. "Umbrella"
5. "Be There With You"
6. "On the Road"
7. "Likes Them"
8. "Truth"
9. "Face in the Crowd"
10. "Tomorrow"
11. "Berlin 38 (Next Year in Jerusalem)"
12. "Soldier"

== Singles ==
1. "Tomorrow"
  b/w non-album track, "Coming Down"
2. "The Waiting Zone" (radio edit)
  b/w "Berlin 38 (Next Year in Jerusalem)"

== Personnel ==
- Ulf Christiansson - lead vocals, guitar
- Peter Carlsohn - bass guitar, background vocals
- Reidar I Paulsen - keyboards, background vocals
- Mikael Ulvsgärd - drums, background vocals
