= Theocracy (album) =

Studio album by Theocracy
- Released: Late 2003
- Recorded: January 2002 - May 2003
- Studio: Theocracized Studios, Athens, GA
- Genre: Christian metal, power metal, progressive metal
- Length: 68:25
- Label: MetalAges
- Producer: Matt Smith

Theocracy chronology
Theocracy (2003)	Mirror of Souls (2008)

Professional ratings
Review scores
Source	Rating
Angelic Warlord	95%
Cross Rhythms	8/10
Imperiumi.net	9/10

Theocracy is the self-titled debut album by Christian progressive power metal band Theocracy. It was released in 2003 on MetalAges Records. The album was a one-man project created by musician Matt Smith. The album was remastered and re-released in 2013 consisting of various mixing upgrades performed by Matt Smith and the addition of live drums recorded by Theocracy drummer Shawn Benson.

== Track listing ==
All tracks are written by Matt Smith.

No.	Title	Length
1.	"Prelude"	1:36
2.	"Ichthus"	4:39
3.	"The Serpent's Kiss"	11:56
4.	"Mountain"	4:48
5.	"Theocracy"	6:00
6.	"The Healing Hand": I. "The Gift"; II. "Restoration"; III. "Adulation"; IV. "Betrayal"; V. "Eternity"	11:36: 2:57; 2:07; 0:50; 3:46; 1:56
7.	"Sinner"	6:08
8.	"New Jerusalem"	5:10
9.	"The Victory Dance"	5:02
10.	"Twist of Fate": I. "Descent Into the Valley of the Shadow"; II. "Passage Through the Valley"; III. "Ascent Unto the Mountain"	11:30: 1:02; 7:55; 2:33
Total length:		68:25

== Personnel ==
- Matt Smith – vocals, guitars, bass, keyboards, drum programming
