= Volym 2 (Volume 2) =

Studio album by Jerusalem
- Released: 1980
- Recorded: Supreme Studio, Stockholm, Sweden
- Genre: Hard rock, rock
- Length: 44:49
- Label: Prim
- Producer: Swante Bengtsson

Jerusalem chronology
| Jerusalem (Volume 1) (1978) | Volym 2 (Volume 2) (1980) | Krigsman (Warrior) (1981) |

Alternative cover
- English album cover

Volym 2 (Volume 2) is the second album by the Swedish hard rock band Jerusalem, released in 1980. The Swedish version was released on Prim Records. The English version was released on Lamb & Lion Records in the United States and on Word Records in the UK.

== Track listing ==
All songs by Ulf Christiansson, except "Dialogue" by Dan Tibell. Swedish version

1. "Pass på"
2. "Bara rock'n'roll"
3. "Kärlekssång"
4. "Getsemane"
5. "Jag behöver dej"
6. "Introduktion"
7. "Dialog"
8. "Ajöss med dej värld"
9. "Jag vill ge dej en blomma"

English version

1. "Wake Up"
2. "Rock-n-Roll"
3. "Love Song"
4. "Gethsemane"
5. "I Depend on You, Jesus"
6. "Introduction"
7. "Dialogue (Between One Person)"
8. "Bye Bye World"
9. "A Flower"

== Personnel ==
- Ulf Christiansson – lead vocals, guitar
- Anders Mossberg – bass guitar
- Dan Tibell – keyboards
- Klas Anderhell – drums
