= Morphia (band) =

Dutch symphonic death/doom metal band

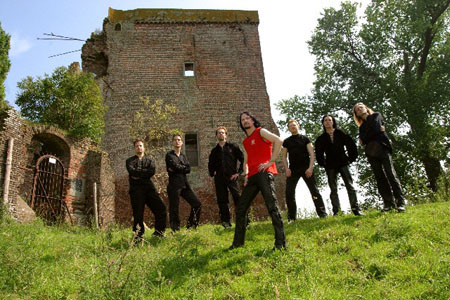
- The Morphia Band in 2005

Background information
- Origin: Netherlands
- Genres: Death metal, doom metal, symphonic metal, gothic metal
- Years active: 1995–2008
- Label: Fear Dark
- Website: http://www.morphia.nl

Morphia was a Dutch symphonic death/doom metal band formed in 1995. Performing concerts with groups such as After Forever, Epica, Autumn, Orphanage and Imperia established Morphia as a prominent symphonic doom metal band in the Netherlands. Signed to Dutch Fear Dark Records, Morphia has released three studio albums, evolving from death metal to gothic doom over the years. The band name is a reference to morphine, a drug used to relieve pain, and to Morpheus, the god of dreams in Greek mythology.

== Biography ==
In 1995, Werner Wensink (vocals/bass), Bert Bonestroo (mixer), Martin Koedoot (guitar), Roger Koedoot (guitar), Ernst Jan Lemmen (drums), and Peter Tulder (keyboards) formed Morphia as a death metal band that evolved to symphonic doom metal. In 1997, they released the demo CD Poison Minded. In 1998, they recorded their first album, Unfulfilled Dreams, published in 1999.

After attaining some success, singer Werner left the band. When singer Jasper Pieterson joined, they wrote and recorded new songs in 2001 for the second album, Frozen Dust. Morphia signed with Dutch label Fear Dark, which released the album in 2002. Over time, Morphia played with groups such as After Forever and Saviour Machine. In November 2004, the band released their third album, Fading Beauty.

The band played their final show on November 22, 2008 at the Gigant in Apeldoorn as part of the Brainstorm Festival 2008. It was recorded on a DVD released in 2009.

== Music ==
Morphia's sound is deep, emotional, and sleepy, with tempos changing from slow to fast. The vocals emphasize death growls. There are clean vocals, usually in the background, and occasional screaming. Most of the lyrics deal with pain, fear, affection, and faith. The music ranges from complex to pompous to calm, incorporating violin and other symphonic elements.

== Band members ==
Final line-up

- Ernst-Jan Lemmen - drums (1995–2008)
- Peter van Tulder - keyboards, vocals (1995–2008)
- Jasper Pieterson - bass (2000–2008)
- Martin Koedoot - guitar (1995–2008)
- Vincent Eisen - guitar (2005–2008)

Former

- Roger Koedoot - guitar (1995–2005)
- Erik van Tulder - bass (1999–2005)
- Werner Wensink - vocals, bass (1995–2008)

Timeline

== Discography ==
- Poison Minded (1997)
- Unfullfilled Dreams (1999)
- Frozen Dust (2002)
- Fading Beauty (2004)
- One Last Embrace (2009)
