= Okej =

Defunct monthly music magazine in Sweden

- Categories: Music magazine
- Frequency: Monthly
- Founder: Hans Hatwig
- Founded: 1980
- Final issue: Fall 2010
- Country: Sweden
- Based in: Stockholm
- Language: Swedish

Okej was a monthly music magazine published in Sweden between 1980 and 2010. 1984 was the magazine's best-selling year, with a circulation of 156,000 copies, and it was read by an estimated half a million teenagers at the time, close to the entirety of its Swedish target demographic.

== History and profile ==
Okej was started in 1980. Hans Hatwig was the founder of the magazine, which was based in Stockholm. Swedish youth was the target audience of this monthly magazine, which featured articles on pop music. In 1984 it was the best-selling magazine in Sweden. The last issue of Okej appeared in Fall 2010. On 21 January 2011, Kenneth Andrén, the CEO of Egmont essence, announced that the magazine would be shut down.
