= Theocracy (band) =

American power metal band

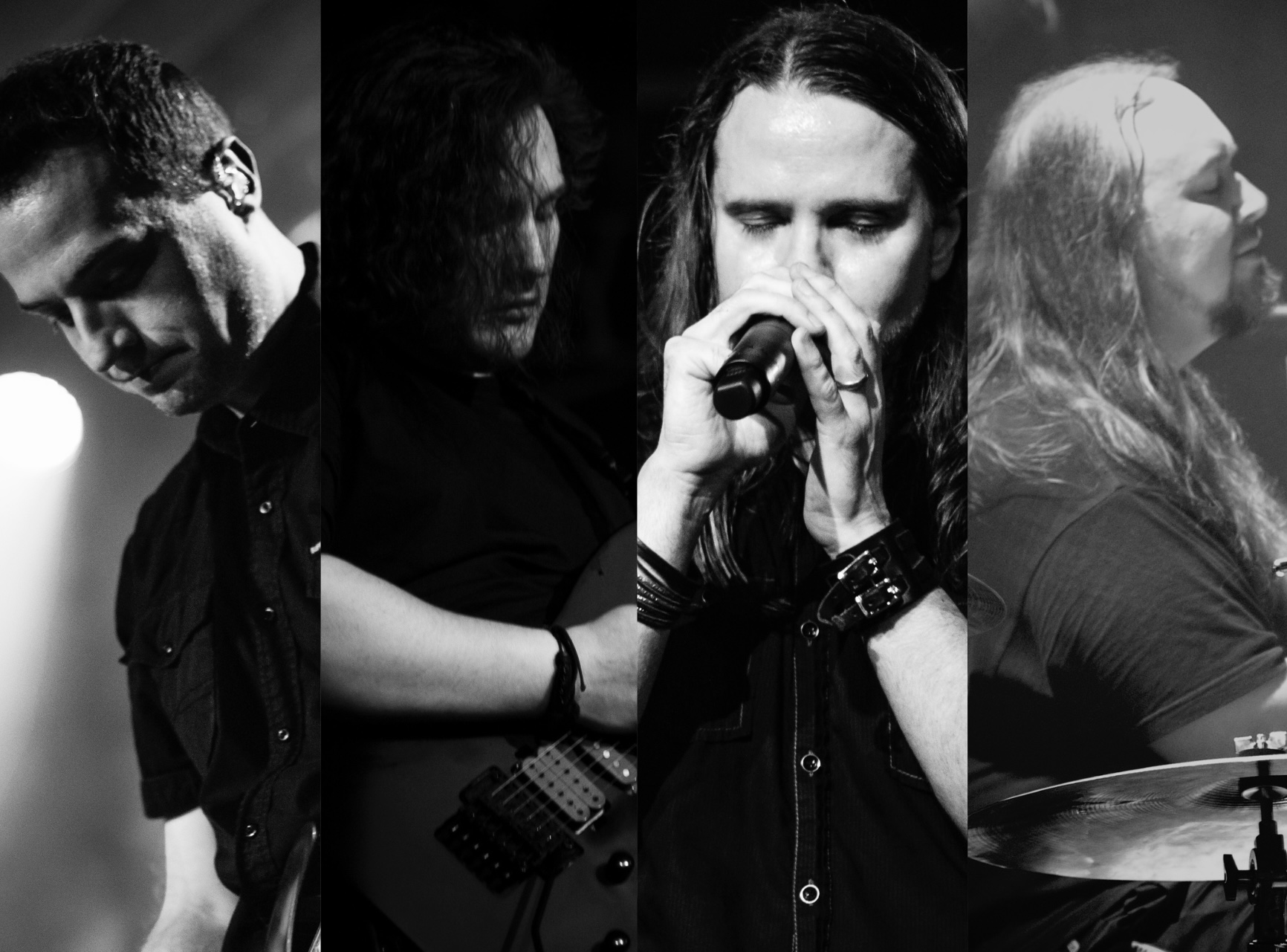
- Theocracy in 2019: From left to right: Jonathan Hinds, Val Allen Wood, Matt Smith, and Ernie Topran

Background information
- Origin: Athens, Georgia, U.S.
- Genres: Power metal, Christian metal, progressive metal
- Years active: 2002–present
- Labels: Atomic Fire, Ulterium, MetalAges
- Members: Matt Smith; Jonathan Hinds; Jared Oldham; Ernie Topran; Taylor Washington
- Past members: Seth Filkins; Josh Sloan; Patrick Parris; Patrick Nickell; Shawn Benson; Val Allen Wood
- Website: www.theocracymusic.com

Theocracy is an American Christian progressive power metal band founded in 2002 by Matt Smith of Athens, Georgia. They have released five albums and multiple Christmas singles.

== History ==
Theocracy started as a one-man project with all the instruments and vocals on the debut album Theocracy performed by Smith. The group performed at the ProgPower USA VII festival Pre-Party in Atlanta, Georgia. Live performances from the show of the songs "The Serpent's Kiss" and "Mountain" were included on the ProgPower VII DVD.

The band's self-titled album was released in late 2003, by MetalAges Records. All instruments were played by Matt Smith. The album had been out of print for several years, and fans have asked for a re-issue. In order to improve upon the drum machine and amateur production of the original release without losing the charm of the recordings, Theocracy drummer Shawn Benson recorded drums on all tracks, while nothing else was re-recorded. Smith completely re-mixed the album, with the mastering handled by Mika Jussila, and on November 19, 2013, Ulterium Records re-released it.

Their second album, Mirror of Souls, was Theocracy's first album as a full band. It was released on November 21, 2008, through Sweden's Ulterium Records and on November 26, 2008, in Japan by Soundholic Records. The Japanese version contains the bonus track "Wages of Sin." The North American edition was released December 9, 2008. A picture disc LP was released through the record label's web store containing "Mirror of Souls," "Laying the Demon to Rest," "Absolution Day," and "The Wages of Sin." This LP was limited to 250 copies worldwide.

As the World Bleeds was released on November 21, 2011. After releasing their new album, Theocracy released their first official music video from the new album, entitled "Hide in the Fairytale" on September 5, 2012. The band embarked on a European tour to promote the remastered re-release of the self-titled album in November 2013. The tour consisted of smaller venue shows as well as larger festivals including Brainstorm Festival in The Netherlands, Blast of Eternity, and Rock Without Limits in Germany, and Maata Näkyvissä Festival in Finland. Joshua Street filled in for drummer Shawn Benson for this tour.

On October 28, 2016, they released their fourth studio album, Ghost Ship, through Ulterium Records. It includes their second official music video for the album's title track filmed in Atlanta, along with lyric videos for "Wishing Well" and "Easter".

On March 2, 2023, they announced that they had a new album coming out soon under a new label and not on Ulterium Records. They did not provide any details about the upcoming album, except that it was "mastered and ready to roll." On August 3, the band revealed they had signed with Atomic Fire and the new album would be released later in 2023. A week later, they released the single and music video for the song "Return to Dust" while simultaneously announcing the October 13 release of their fifth studio album, Mosaic.

== Band members ==
Current members

- Matt Smith – lead vocals (2002–present), keyboards (2002–2008), lead guitar, bass (2002–2009)
- Jonathan Hinds – rhythm guitar, backing vocals, keyboards (2006–present)
- Jared Oldham – bass, backing vocals (2009–present)
- Ernie Topran – drums (2016–present)
- Taylor Washington – lead guitar, backing vocals (2022–present)

Former members

- Seth Filkins – bass, backing vocals (2004–2007)
- Josh Sloan – bass, backing vocals (2007–2008)
- Patrick Parris – bass, backing vocals (2008–2009)
- Shawn Benson – drums (2005–2014)
- Patrick Nickell – drums (2014–2015)
- Val Allen Wood – lead guitar, backing vocals (2009–2020)

Timeline

== Discography ==
- Theocracy (2003)
- Mirror of Souls (2008)
- As the World Bleeds (2011)
- Ghost Ship (2016)
- Mosaic (2023)

== Christmas ==
Starting in 2003, the band has recorded and released one Christmas-themed song for free download to all members of their "Club of Souls" fan group per year through 2012, located on their official website, as well as additional songs in 2014 and 2019. In 2013, Matt Smith instead dedicated his efforts to the Collide & Spark charity special, released as Project Aegis. In 2015, Theocracy instead were working on a new album, therefore did not have any time to record a new Christmas song.

- 2003: "Theocracy Christmas"
- 2004: "Little Drummer Boy"
- 2005: "Deck the Joy (To the Halls)"
- 2006: "Christmas Medley" (2006 Remix)
- 2007: "O Come, O Come, Emmanuel"
- 2008: "Rudolph vs. Frosty"
- 2009: "Angels from the Realms of Glory"
- 2010: "All I Want for Christmas"
- 2011: "Theocracy Christmas" (2011 Remix/Remaster)
- 2012: "Wynter Fever"
- 2014: "Night of Silence"
- 2019: "Snowglobe"
