= Hell's Bells: The Dangers of Rock 'N' Roll =

- Directed by: Erik Hollander; Eric Holmberg
- Written by: Eric Holmberg; Mark Holmberg; Steve Isaac; W. Roy McIndoes; Robert Waliszewski
- Produced by: Erik Hollander; Eric Holmberg
- Cinematography: Erik Hollander
- Edited by: Erik Hollander; James Gelet; Angela Potthoff
- Production company: American Portrait Films
- Distributed by: Art of The Covenant (1989, USA, VHS)
- Release date: August 1, 1989 (United States)
- Running time: 185 minutes
- Country: United States
- Language: English

Hell's Bells: The Dangers of Rock 'N' Roll is a 1989 Christian documentary film produced and directed by Eric Holmberg, founder of Reel to Real Ministries and The Apologetics Group. Holmberg also produced and directed its sequel, Hell's Bells 2 - The Power and Spirit of Popular Music (2004).

== Overview ==
The film examines the relationship of rock music to sex, violence, suicide, drug use, rebellion, the occult, and other activities considered immoral by biblical theology. The film portrays various lyrics and visual imagery in rock music and rock stars as evidence that it is satanic or anti-Christian. It also alleges that satanic messages exist in several examples of popular songs and music culture. Among other acts, the film prominently features The Beatles, The Doors, Led Zeppelin and Madonna as examples of musicians who have knowingly introduced occult thought into American society.

== Reception ==
Christian Film Guide referred to the film as a "classic documentary on rock music and its roots and influences." Pitchfork Media also reviewed the film, saying that they did see where the film had aged since it was filmed and had multiple factual errors, but that it also "introduced thousands of viewers to Venom, Mercyful Fate, and Diamanda Galas--artists your standard youth group would never have heard otherwise."

== See also ==
- Social effects of rock music
