= Jerusalem (Jerusalem album) =

Jerusalem (Volume 1)

Studio album by Jerusalem
- Released: 1978
- Studio: Supreme Studio, Stockholm, Sweden
- Genre: Hard rock, rock
- Length: 45:28
- Label: Prim
- Producer: Swante Bengtsson

Jerusalem chronology
Jerusalem (Volume 1) (1978)	Volym 2 (Volume 2) (1980)

Jerusalem is the first album by Swedish hard rock band Jerusalem. The Swedish version was released in 1978 on Prim Records. The English version (renamed Volume 1) was released in 1980 on Lamb & Lion Records in the United States and on Word Records in the UK.

== Track listing ==
All songs by Ulf Christiansson, except "Days Passing By" ("Dagarna går") by Dan Tibell and "Fångsång" by Bertil Sörensson. String arrangement on "Come To Me" ("Kom till mej") by Swante Bengtsson.

=== Swedish version ===
1. "Tänk om Jesus har rätt"
2. "Noa"
3. "Kanske"
4. "Pappa vem har gjort"
5. "Mr Ego"
6. "Kom till mej"
7. "Om du lyssnar"
8. "Dagarna går"
9. "Jesus är det underbaraste"
10. "Hög tid"
11. "Fångsång"
  This song was left off the English release.
12. "Neutral"

=== English version ===
1. "Noah" - 3:33
2. "Jesus is the Most Fantastic" - 2:26
3. "Maybe" - 4:24
4. "Daddy Who Has Made" - 3:50
5. "Mr. Ego" - 3:32
6. "Come to Me" - 3:41
7. "If You Only Care to Listen" - 4:13
8. "Neutral" - 2:47
9. "Days Passing By" - 4:52
10. "What If Jesus is Right" - 3:37
11. "High Tide" - 5:26

Total time: 42:06

== Personnel ==
- Ulf Christiansson - lead vocals, guitar
- Bertil Sörensson - bass guitar, background vocals
- Dan Tibell - keyboards
- Dan Gansmoe - drums
