= HM (magazine) =

Christian hard rock magazine

HM (Heaven's Metal)
- HM Magazine, Issue #117 featuring P.O.D., January/February 2006
- Editor: David Stagg
- Categories: Christian metal
- Frequency: Monthly
- Publisher: David Stagg
- Founder: Doug Van Pelt
- First issue: Summer 1985
- Final issue: 2011 (print)
- Company: HM Publications LLC
- Country: United States
- Based in: Houston, Texas
- Language: American English
- Website: hmmagazine.com
- ISSN: 1066-6923

HM Magazine is a monthly, digital and print on demand publication focusing on hard rock music and alternative culture of interest to Christians. It is based in Houston, Texas. Originally published as Heaven's Metal, it was renamed to HM in 1995. In late 2004 Heaven's Metal was reissued as a separate publication from HM, with some shared editorial overlap.

== History ==
Heaven's Metal Fanzine featuring Theocracy

In 1985, a journalist Doug Van Pelt started Heaven's Metal as a fanzine. It changed its name in 1995 to HM, standing for Hard Music, but the Heaven's Metal branding was brought back in 2004 and was released alongside HM. Heaven's Metal achieved more popularity and became an official publication, with five full-time journalists working for the magazine. In 2000, HM achieved a regular subscription base of 15,000 readers.

During the 1990s, HM sealed a distribution deal with a major magazine wholesaler that immediately increased its print-run from 13,000 to 22,000 copies, and it allowed Van Pelt and his co-workers to double ad rates, making HM a stable business enterprise. The most popular issue of the publication was No. 77 (May/June 1999), where Doug Pinnick of King's X came out as homosexual. A subsequent wave of Christian music retailers refusing to sell the music of King's X is attributed to the publicizing of Pinnick's sexuality in that HM issue.

In 2010, Heaven's Metal ceased print and its content was merged into the digital issues of HM. In February 2013, Van Pelt sold HM to current editor David Stagg. Van Pelt remains the owner and publisher of Heaven's Metal, which is officially a separate publication even though it shares some editorial coverage with HM.

In 2025 Doug Van Pelt and the team launched two new issues: the "40th Anniversary Issue", and the "Special 40th Anniversary Issue". Both featured a flip cover featuring two bands. The first featured Saint and Bride, the second featured Stryper and Demon Hunter. In 2026 Heaven's Metal released the "41st Anniversary Issue", the cover featuring Galactic Cowboys.
