= Refuge Records =

- Founded: 1980
- Founder: Greg Nelson, Jack Hafer, Ray Nenow
- Genre: Contemporary Christian music
- Country of origin: United States

Refuge Records was a contemporary Christian music record label founded in 1980 by Greg Nelson, Jack Hafer and Ray Nenow.

One imprint of Refuge was Pure Metal Records, although Star Song Communications bought out that branch in 1990. The label had Doug Mann, future founder of R.E.X. Records, as an employee.

== Artists ==
- Edin-Ådahl
- Daniel Amos (Vox Humana in 1984)
- Daniel Band
- Bride
- The Choir (Shades of Grey ep)
- Robin Crow
- Jerusalem (Dancing on the Head of the Serpent in 1988)
- Joe English (Held Accountable in 1982)
- Tommy Funderburk group known as "The Front"
- Larry Howard (Shout and Sanctified Blues.)
- Phil Madeira (Citizen of Heaven in 1986)
- Newsboys (Read All About It in 1988)
- In 3D (No Glasses Needed 1985)
- Scott Roley

== See also ==
- List of record labels
