= Lamb & Lion Records =

American Christian record label

Lamb & Lion Records is a Christian record label founded in 1972 by the popular singer and actor Pat Boone and the former United Artists Records executive Irving Kessler. Based in California, the label featured Pat Boone, The Pat Boone Family, Debby Boone, DeGarmo & Key, Dan Peek, James Ward, and Gary Chapman.
