= Kekal discography =

- Studio albums: 9
- Extended plays: 2
- Compilation albums: 2
- Singles: 5
- Video albums: 2
- Music videos: 7
- Collaborations: 4
- Demos: 2
- Sample tracks: 7

The discography of the Indonesian band Kekal includes nine full-length studio albums, two EPs, two compilation albums, two demo tapes, a split album with Slechtvalk, and several contributions to various collaborative albums. Though the band currently has no active members, it continues to exist as an institution, and still releases new material.

Kekal formed in 1995 in Jakarta, Indonesia, and released an unofficial four-song demo tape. As this demo began to circulate, additional members joined to release an official demo album called Contra Spiritualia Nequitae in 1996, and in 1998 Kekal released its self-produced debut album, Beyond the Glimpse of Dreams, which gained the band international attention. The following year, 1999, the band released Embrace the Dead, followed by The Painful Experience in 2001. The departure of guitarist Leo Setiawan in 2001 left the band as a duo consisting of Jeff Arwadi and Azhar Levi Sianturi, but the band continued and released the highly progressive and experimental 1000 Thoughts of Violence in 2003, which led to a two-week European mini-tour in March 2004. Upon return to Indonesia, Kekal recorded Acidity, which was released in 2005, and marked the return of Leo to the band. This album was considered by many to be the band's strongest release to date, and The Habit of Fire was recorded in 2006. However, Jeff's relocation to Canada left the status of the band in question, but it was decided to keep the band as a studio project, and The Habit of Fire was released in 2007, and was named "CD of the Month" by technology magazine Sound on Sound. In 2008, the band's seventh full-length album, Audible Minority, was intended to be released on December 25, 2008, as both a digital free download and a limited edition Digipak with a total of 11 songs. The CD version was never released, and the album ended up being offered only as a free download instead.

In 2009, all band members left Kekal, but it was decided to keep the band simply as a legal institution. Despite this, former members of the band contributed to an eighth studio album, entitled 8, which was officially released in December 2010 and was made available to purchase on January 23, 2011. On July 10, 2011, a free digital-only EP entitled Futuride was released, and a ninth full-length release, Autonomy, was released on December 19, 2012.

== Albums ==
=== Studio albums ===
Year	Details
1998	Beyond the Glimpse of Dreams: Released: January 1998; Label: THT Productions, Sonic Wave International; Format: Cassette, CD
1999	Embrace the Dead: Released: August 1999; Label: THT Productions, Fleshwalker Records; Format: Cassette, CD
2001	The Painful Experience: Released: October 2001; Label: Fear Dark Records, THT Productions, Clenchedfist Records, HROM/HIRAX Records; Format: Cassette, CD
2003	1000 Thoughts of Violence: Released: February 2003; Label: Fear Dark Records, Undying Music/Alfa Records, Rock Express Records; Format: Cassette, CD
2005	Acidity: Released: February 2005; Label: THT Productions/T.O.P./Musica Studios, Fear Dark Records; Format: Cassette, CD, digital
2007	The Habit of Fire: Released: March 15, 2007; Label: Whirlwind Records; Open Grave Records; Format: CD, digital
2008	Audible Minority: Released: December 25, 2008; Label: Self-released; Format: Digital
2010	8: Released: December 15, 2010; Label: Whirlwind Records; Format: CD, digital
2012	Autonomy: Released: December 19, 2012; Label: Whirlwind Records, Yes No Wave Music; Format: CD, digital
2015	Multilateral: Released: August 2015; Label: -; Format: Digital

=== Extended plays ===
Year	Details
2011	Futuride: Released: July 10, 2011; Label: Self-released; Format: Digital
2013	Unsung Division EP: Released: March 19, 2013; Label: Self-released; Format: Digital

=== Compilation albums ===
Year	Details
2003	Introduce Us to Immortality: Released: 2003; Label: SystemMortal Productions/THT Productions
2004	Spirits from the Ancient Days: Released: 2004; Label: Kvlt Records

=== Demos ===
Year	Details
1995	Demo: Released: November 1995; Label: Self-released
1996	Contra Spiritualia Nequitiae: Released: 1996; Label: THT Productions

== Singles ==
Year	Single	Details	Album
2004	"Dream for a Moment"		Acidity
2006	"The Prow"	Voivod cover song	Recorded for Acidity, unreleased, leaked by Jeff in 2006
2006	"Juices Like Wine"	Celtic Frost cover song	Recorded for Acidity, unreleased, leaked by Jeff in 2006
2007	"Redemption"	Johnny Cash cover tune	Unreleased Johnny Cash tribute album, released by Jeff in 2007
2010	"Tabula Rasa"		8

== Videos ==
Year	Video details
2004	Kekal Live in Europe: Released: 2004; Label: SonnenGott; Format: DVD
2005	Road Trip to Acidity: Released: 2005; Label: Self-released; Format: DVD

== Music videos ==
Year	Title	Album
2007	"A Dream for a Moment"	Acidity
2007	"Isolated I"	The Habit of Fire
2008	"Narrow Avenue"	Audible Minority
2010	"Tabula Rasa"	8
2011	"Track One"	8
2011	"Futuride"	Futuride EP
2012	"Rare Earth Elements"	Autonomy

== Contributions ==
=== Collaborations ===
Year	Details
2000	A Tribute to Living Sacrifice: Released: 2000; Label: Clenchedfist Records
2002	Chaos & Warfare: Split with Slechtvalk; Released: 2002; Label: Fear Dark Records
2002	A Brutal Christmas — The Season in Chaos
2003	Covered in Filth: A Tribute to Cradle of Filth: Released: February 15, 2003; Label: Deadline/Cleopatra Records

=== Sample contributions ===
Year	Details	Song
Unknown	Sounds of Approaching Destruction Vol .2: Label: THT Productions	Unknown
2001	Self Krusher compilation: 5th Anniversary THT Productions: Label: THT Productions	Unknown
2002	Overcome or Burn Forever in Hell/Arachnid Terror Sampler: Label: Tarantula Promotions; Notes: Combination sampler album and EP by Paradox	"Mean Attraction"
2006	Asian Metal Collections — The Gathering 2: Label: Sonic Wave International	"Rotting Youth"
2007	Sounds from the Grave Vol. 2: Label: Open Grave Records	"Isolated I"
2008	Sounds from the Grave Vol. V: Label: Open Grave Records	"The Vampire Song"
2011	Cold Hands Seduction Vol. 117: Released: 2011; Label: Sonic Seducer	"Tabula Rasa"
