= Azhar Levi Sianturi =

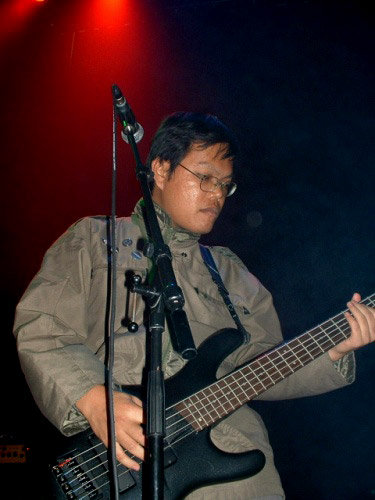
- Azhar Levi in the Netherlands, 2004 – European mini-tour

Background information
- Origin: Indonesia
- Genres: Avant-garde metal, progressive metal, extreme metal, noisegrind
- Occupations: Musician, mechanical engineer
- Instruments: Bass, guitar, vocals
- Years active: 1996–present

Azhar Levi Sianturi is an Indonesian musician and mechanical engineer. He is mainly known in the music scene as the former bassist for avant-garde/progressive metal band Kekal. He also has his own grindcore project called Mournphagy. His professional occupation is a mechanical engineer where he makes a living from, and he is also known lately as an avid coffee enthusiast and runs his own coffee roastery and brewing shop in Jakarta called Orkidé Coffee.

== Kekal ==
Azhar Levi joined Kekal on 1996, the same year that the band released their official demo, Contra Spiritualia Nequitiae. Throughout the first 5 years, the band developed their style by incorporating many diverse elements from outside metal. This distinct style became most prominent in their third album The Painful Experience, which marked as a starting point for the band to step more and more into progressive and avant-garde metal and make further experiments with their music. In the year 2003, Kekal released 1000 Thoughts of Violence and received positive media reviews which led to their first international tour in 2004. Shortly after this success, Kekal was back in the studio to record their official reunion album, Acidity, which was released in 2005.

In March 2009, Azhar Levi decided to step down from Kekal. Front man Jeff Arwadi said that although this closed a door, Kekal would continue as a musical unit. However, later that year, Jeff himself stepped down, along with remaining member Leo Setiawan, but it was decided that Kekal as an institution would remain in existence.

Despite the fact that the band is now member-less, Kekal has continued to function as a musical unit, with all 3 former members including Azhar Levi contributing to the band's eighth studio album, entitled 8 in 2010, and ninth studio album Autonomy in 2012. Azhar Levi did not write or play any music in those albums, but he made hand-drawn illustrations and photography for both albums' covers.

== Discography ==
=== With Kekal ===
- Beyond the Glimpse of Dreams – 1998
- Embrace the Dead – 1999
- The Painful Experience – 2001
- 1000 Thoughts of Violence – 2003
- Acidity – 2005
- The Habit of Fire – 2007
- Audible Minority – 2008
- 8 – 2010
- Autonomy – 2012

=== With Mournphagy ===
- Thy Word Abideth (EP) – 1997
- For You – 1999
- Thy Word Abideth (re-release by Noise Squatch) -2000
- Self Krusher compilation: 5th Anniversary THT Productions – 2001
