= Leo Setiawan =

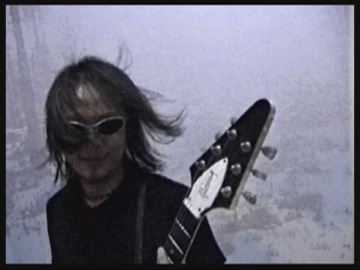
- Leo Setiawan – 2005 Acidity sessions

Background information
- Origin: Indonesia
- Genres: Avant-garde metal, progressive metal/rock, experimental, extreme metal
- Occupations: Musician, civil engineer
- Instruments: Guitar, narration and keyboard
- Years active: 1996–present

Leonard "Leo" Setiawan is mainly known as a former guitarist for progressive metal band Kekal. His main occupation is civil engineer and he owns and operates a building development firm in Jakarta, Indonesia.

== Kekal ==
Leo joined Kekal in 1996, just after the band released their official demo, Contra Spiritualia Nequitiae. Kekal had originally been primarily a black metal band but Leo brought with him a diverse set of musical influences which, throughout the first 5 years, allowed the band to develop their style by incorporating many diverse elements from outside metal. This distinct style became most prominent in their third album The Painful Experience, which marked as a starting point for the band to step more and more into progressive and avant-garde metal and make further experiments with their music. Shortly after this album was released, Leo Setiawan left the band and moved to Melbourne, where he pursued his master's degree in Civil Engineering.

Leo Setiawan later moved back to Indonesia, and was back in the studio with Kekal to record their official reunion album, Acidity in 2005.

In 2009, Kekal front man Jeff Arwadi stepped down from the band and Leo announced that, since Jeff left the band, he would as well. As bassist Azhar Sianturi had already left Kekal, the departure of Jeff and Leo rendered the band member-less. Despite this, it was decided that Kekal would continue as an institution. In evidence of the band's continued existence, Kekal has released two more albums to date; 8 and Autonomy in 2010 and 2012 respectively, to which all 3 former members of Kekal have contributed.

== Discography ==
- Beyond the Glimpse of Dreams – 1998
- Embrace the Dead – 1999
- The Painful Experience – 2001
- Self Krusher compilation: 5th Anniversary THT Productions – 2001
- Introduce Us to Immortality – 2003
- Road Trip to Acidity – 2005
- Acidity – 2005
- The Habit of Fire – 2007
- Audible Minority – 2008
- 8 – 2010
- Autonomy – 2012
