= Altera Enigma =

Australian Christian metal band

- Origin: Melbourne, Victoria, Australia; Jakarta, Indonesia
- Genres: Christian metal, death metal, avant-garde metal, progressive metal, jazz fusion
- Years active: 2004–present
- Labels: Independent
- Members: Jayson Sherlock; Jason De Ron; Kenny Cheong
- Past members: Jeff Arwadi
- Website: Official Altera Enigma Website

Altera Enigma is a Christian metal band formed by Melbourne, Australia-based Jason De Ron, the former guitarist and front man of Paramaecium, and Jakarta, Indonesia native Jefray Arwadi, former guitarist, vocalist, and front man of Kekal. Both of these musicians have a career that has seen them record and release nearly 20 albums between them. According to Jason De Ron, the name Altera Enigma was chosen because it represents something mysterious and unique. Kenny Cheong, a jazz fusion bassist, joined the project in 2005, and Altera Enigma's first album was released in 2006. Jayson Sherlock, a former band-mate of De Ron in Paramecium and also a former member of the band Mortification and the sole member of Horde, joined on drums in 2007. In 2009, Jeff Arwadi, having relocated from Indonesia to Canada in 2007, decided to step down from the project.

== Biography ==
Altera Enigma was formed as an outlet for Jason and Jeff to work together on music that would push their boundaries and challenge them musically. While both Jason and Jeff are more well known for playing metal music, both musicians claim a heavy influence from jazz and progressive music in all its forms. In an interview with NekroBlog, Jason said that, generally, metal has very limited emotional range, and that Altera Enigma is an attempt to break that mold. Kenny Cheong, a jazz fusion bassist who plays a five string fretless, joined the band in 2005 and allowed Altera Enigma to further develop their signature sound.

The band released its first album, Alteration, in 2006.

2007 saw the addition of drummer Jayson Sherlock, formerly of Mortification, Paramaecium, and Horde.

The band is in the process of creating a new album, but progress on the record has been slow due to various events in the band members lives. As of March 2010, Jeff, who now resides in Calgary, Alberta, Canada, decided that he needed to step away from Altera Enigma, and his contribution to the project is now minimal, although according to Jason DeRon the band will continue to take advantage of his creativity and inventiveness.

As of May 2011, the band have announced that work on their second album is almost complete, with bass, keys, guitars done, and only drums left to record.

== Lineup ==
Current members

- Jason De Ron (2004–present) – Guitar, bass, keyboards (Paramaecium/inExordium, Soundscape)
- Jayson Sherlock (2007–present) – Drums (Paramaecium, inExordium, Mortification, Horde, Soundscape, Revulsed)
- Kenny Cheong (2005–present) – Bass (Soundscape)

Former members

- Jefray Arwadi (2004–2010) – Guitar, vocals (Kekal, Doctor D, Armageddon Holocaust, Excision, Inner Warfare)

== Discography ==
- Alteration (2006)
