= Jeff Arwadi =

Jefray Arwadi
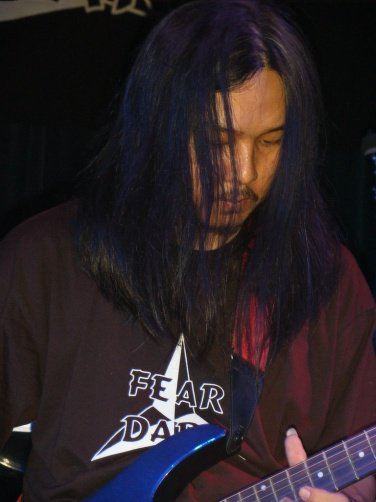
- Jeff – live in the Netherlands, 2004

Background information
- Also known as: Meister J
- Born: Jefray Kurnia Arwadi; 1974 (age 51–52); Jakarta, Indonesia
- Genres: Ambient, avant-garde metal, electronic, extreme metal, progressive metal, progressive rock
- Occupations: Musician, graphic designer, music producer, audio/mixing engineer
- Instruments: Guitar, vocals, bass, drum machine, laptop computer
- Years active: 1992 – present
- Formerly of: Kekal, Armageddon Holocaust, Altera Enigma

Jefray Kurnia "Jeff" Arwadi (born 1974 (Note: The exact birth date of Jefray Arwadi is unknown. However, he started playing music in 1989 when he was fifteen, which puts his birth date around 1974.)) is an Indonesian musician, music producer, and graphic designer. A native of Jakarta, Indonesia, he now resides in Calgary, Canada. He is mostly known as a former guitarist, vocalist, and record producer for the avant-garde/progressive metal band Kekal. Professionally, he has made a career as a graphic designer and has worked at various companies for more than a decade. In the past, he was also known in the music scene for his works as a freelance graphic designer under Soundmind Graphics, and until his 2006 move to Canada, Jeff owned and ran his own home-based recording studio, Vision Studio, in Jakarta. He also was a staff member of the record label THT Productions. In addition to his roles in Kekal, he was also the co-founder of progressive metal project Altera Enigma and was involved with bands such as Armageddon Holocaust and Inner Warfare.

== History ==
Jeff was born in Jakarta, Indonesia's capital city and largest municipality. Since his early childhood, he has shown interests in art and music in general. Spending most of his upbringing in a global city, Jeff had an early exposure in the diversity of culture, religion and ethnicity, which helped to form his views of seeing the music and art in a liberal way. He once tried to become a painter but later found out that music suits him better, as he explained on the 2007 interview with Ultimate Metal webzine: "I cannot express with other media such as painting or poetry. My father is a painter and he expresses himself through this. I once tried it, but it didn’t work for me – I can make technically proficient sketches and illustrations, but felt distant from them. It’s like a cold relationship. So when I found music and started to write songs, it just came up to me and I said to myself 'that's it, this is the most suitable medium for me'. But for right now, I don't rely on music as my career, I work another job to pay the bills." In 2000, Jeff graduated from Atma Jaya Catholic University of Indonesia with a Bachelor's degree in Psychology, and according to another interview with Ultimate Metal, he taught himself graphic design through books and internet.

In 2006 Jeff moved to Canada and eventually became a permanent resident. He was living in Toronto while taking a study in audio engineering, and later on relocated to Calgary and settled there.

== Music ==
Jeff started playing guitar back in 1989 when he was 15 years old. In 1990, with his high-school friends, he formed his own band, Obliteration, in which he at first played bass but then switched to drums. The project was precursor to the later band Kekal, and played a primitive style of punk and thrash metal. Jeff decided to quit this band in 1991 to spend more time learning the guitar. In 1992 he bought his first electric guitar and joined a band called Sonic Warfare (which later changed its name to Inner Warfare) as a guitarist and vocalist. According to Jeff, this was his first serious band, and Inner Warfare wrote its own music, played shows, and recorded some demos before disbanding in 1997.

=== Kekal ===
Jeff has been involved in Kekal as a guitarist, vocalist, songwriter and record producer since the band's inception in 1995, and he was listed as an official member of the band from 1996 until 2009. Kekal started out as an extreme metal band, and gradually progressed into more electronic-influenced experimental and avant-garde metal. The band has met with critical acclaim, and has released eight full-length albums so far. Kekal is considered as the first metal band from Indonesia to make international inroads by releasing albums through record labels in Europe and North America, and being the first band from Indonesia to tour Europe in 2004.

In 2006, Jeff Arwadi moved to Canada while the rest of the members remained in Indonesia, which left the band unable to play shows and do touring. At the same time the band left their longtime record label Fear Dark and status of the band was in question. After few months of uncertainty and rumors of break-up went around among fans, Kekal decided to remain together and to keep the band only as a studio project. They signed licensing deals to two new record labels in Europe and North America and released The Habit of Fire a year after, which met with international success and critical acclaim.

In August 2009, Jeff announced that he and all other members of Kekal had left the band, but it was decided that the name would continue without active band members. Jeff stated that, in addition to unspecified personal reasons, he decided to leave the band because, after being closer to nature and in a less densely populated city in Canada, he was unable to continue to make dark and angry metal music which he did in the past with Kekal. Many of their fans perceived that Kekal had technically split-up/disbanded at the moment band leader Jeff announced his departure from the band, despite the fact that Kekal as an institution still existed and the institution itself was not affected by any founding member leaving. To end the confusions among their fans, the band issued a statement posted on their official Facebook page that clarified the status of the band.

Despite him leaving Kekal, Jeff still contributes to the band as a songwriter, performer and recording producer, which released its eight studio album 8 in December 2010, and ninth studio album Autonomy in December 2012.

=== Altera Enigma ===
Altera Enigma was formed in 2004 when Jeff Arwadi teamed up with Australian guitarist Jason DeRon, formerly of Paramaecium. The band was created as an outlet for the two musicians to work together on music that would push their boundaries, challenge them musically and allow them to broaden their horizons and explore progressive music in all its forms. Altera Enigma released its debut album, Alteration, in 2006.

As of March 2010, Jeff decided that he needed to step away from Altera Enigma, and his contribution to the project is now minimal, although according to Jason DeRon the band will continue to take advantage of his creativity and inventiveness.

=== Armageddon Holocaust ===
Jeff was also involved with Armageddon Holocaust as Meister J. Armageddon Holocaust originally formed as a one-time project by two founders under pseudonyms Doctor Dark and Dark Thriller. Jeff provided drum programming on the project's debut album Into Total Destruction as well as his audio engineering and production talents as a producer and mixing engineer for all three Armageddon Holocaust albums. When the project was restarted in 2002, Jeff took the place of former member Dark Thriller and he used Meister J as a stage name. He remained for the next two albums, Radioactive Zone 245 and Nekrofonik, after which the project disbanded again in 2004.

=== Other projects ===
In addition to Kekal, Altera Engima, and Armageddon Holocaust, Jeff has been involved in other bands and projects including Doctor D and Excision.

== Graphic design and audio production ==
Despite Jeff's formal educational background in Psychology, he currently works professionally as a graphic designer specializing in print, web and multimedia production. On his LinkedIn profile he describes his diverse skills and experience in the creative fields which include audio engineering, music production and video post-production. Besides the bands and studio projects he has involved in, he also helped other independent bands to produce their albums and demos. At one time, Jeff worked for an independent record label THT Productions, and was in charge of all recording production and graphic design. In 2006 he enrolled himself in an audio engineering college in Toronto, Ontario, Canada where he met his teacher/mentor Darryl Neudorf; former member of the band 54-40 and record producer of high-profile Canadian artists such as Sarah McLachlan, The New Pornographers and Blue Rodeo. Under production inputs from Darryl, Jeff produced and recorded many of the songs released as Kekal's album Audible Minority in the college's studio facilities while he learned industry standard DAW programs such as ProTools and Logic Pro.

=== Soundmind Graphics ===
Jeff founded Soundmind Graphics in the year 2000. It was a freelance graphic design service that provided computer-based graphics for web sites, multimedia, and print media for music related industries. In 2011, on Kekal Facebook page he stated that he no longer offers services as Soundmind Graphics.

=== Vision Studio ===
In 2001 Jeff built his own home studio which he named it Vision Studio. It occupied one of the rooms in his house in Jakarta, and was basically a simple computer-based DAW setup that Jeff mentioned its main purpose as "enough for recording music without disturbing the neighbours, so I could spend the night recording music". At Vision Studio, Jeff produced, engineered and mixed many album and demo projects from various bands, including three Kekal albums and all Armageddon Holocaust albums. In 2006, upon moving to Canada, Jeff sold his house including the studio facility.

== Personal life ==
Jeff has stated in several interviews that he is a Christian, but he does not consider himself religious and does not consider his belief in Christianity to be a religion, as it is more about faith. In another interview, Jeff stated: "For me personally, faith is something that drives you to live the life as a human being... I happen to believe in something good, that's why I am always looking for better life and try to improve health, for example. But it does not have to be associated with religion whatsoever. You don't have to be religious to ever believe that there is light at the end of the tunnel, and you don't have to be religious to have a good diet and workout some exercise." In a 2020 interview he described himself as adopting anarchism as a personal philosophy.

Jeff is married and he shares with his wife the hobbies of watching movies, hiking and outdoor photography. Jeff is also known as a big fan of Honda and often cites Soichiro Honda as an inspiration. Although at the time of the interview, he did not consider himself as an automobile enthusiast, he showed his passion in automotive design and is a proponent of hydrogen fuel cell vehicle as the ideal solution for future mobility to replace world's dependency on fossil fuel.

== Discography ==
=== With Kekal ===
- Beyond the Glimpse of Dreams – 1998
- Embrace the Dead – 1999
- The Painful Experience – 2001
- 1000 Thoughts of Violence – 2003
- Acidity – 2005
- The Habit of Fire – 2007
- Audible Minority – 2008
- 8 – 2010
- Autonomy – 2012

=== With Altera Enigma ===
- Alteration – 2006

=== With Armageddon Holocaust ===
- Into Total Destruction – 2000
- Radioactive Zone 245 – 2003
- Nekrofonik – 2004
- Dies Irae – 2004

=== With Excision ===
- Manipulation of Response – 1997
- "Purpose" from the compilation album Last Minutes of Suffering – 1997
- The Quality of Mankind – 1998
- Visi – 2000
- Excision / Worldhate (split release) – 2000
- Self Krusher Compilation – 5th Anniversary THT Productions (compilation album) – 2000
- Brutal Days – 2002
- Default – 2003
- Last Minutes of Safety Vol. 3 (compilation album) – Unknown

== See also ==
- Anarchism in Canada
- Anarchism in Indonesia
- Christian anarchism
