= Acidity (album) =

Studio album by Kekal
- Released: February 2005 (THT Productions/T.O.P/Musica Studios, cassette); March 2005 (Fear Dark Records, CD)
- Recorded: Vision Studio, Jakarta, Indonesia; Studio Vertigo, Melbourne, Australia
- Genre: Avant-garde metal, electronic, extreme metal, heavy metal
- Length: 56:06
- Label: THT Productions/T.O.P. Fear Dark Records
- Producer: Jeff Arwadi; Mixed at Vision Studio

Kekal compilations chronology
Spirits from the Ancient Days (2004)

Kekal studio albums chronology
1000 Thoughts of Violence (2003)	Acidity (2005)	The Habit of Fire (2007)

Professional ratings
Review scores
Source	Rating
Arising Realm Magazine	9.0/10
HM Magazine	favorable
Imperiumi.net	5+/10
Metal Storm	7/10
Powermetal.de	Highly favorable
"Psych Folk" Radio	Extremely favorable
Rock Tribune Magazine	85/100
Terrorizer	8.5/10

Acidity is the fifth album by Indonesian avant-garde metal band Kekal. It was recorded in celebration of the band's tenth anniversary, and was an official reunion album for the band. It marked the return of guitarist Leo Setiawan to the band, and includes the vocal talents of founding member Newbabe. The album was released following the band's successful 2004 European mini-tour, and a promotional concert and release party was held for the album on 13 March 2005 in Indonesia. It was considered by many to be the band's strongest work to date, and is one of four albums available for free download from the band on its website.

There is a music video created for the song "Dream for a Moment".

== Concept ==
The band has stated that while each song does not represent the overall sound of the album, each song contributes to the album concept. According to Jeff, the title is referencing acid indigestion caused by urban stress and eating fast food, and represents the stress of city living and economic hardship.

== Style ==
Acidity continued with the experimental precedent set by 1000 Thoughts of Violence and included a wide variety of musical styles including avant-garde, black metal, classic rock, electronic, indie rock, progressive metal, progressive rock, psychedelic rock, and trip hop. Other elements incorporated into the sound were jazz and ambient passages as well as double-bass drum blasts. The vocals range from black metal shrieks to death growls to clean vocal styles. A review by progressive.homestead.com, a division of "Psych Folk" Radio, listed the album style as including elements of "symphonic metal, heavy metal (more like early Iron Maiden), dark and brutal metal, even a few seconds of hiphop metal". Other elements cited were "gothic wave", jazzy melodies and improvisations, "pop song orientation with metal background", "progressive techno-electronic", "wild" progressive rock, and "some mad freakout theatrical avant-garde vocals", ambient guitar feedback, and "perhaps of few seconds of some Indonesian element."

In an interview on Ultimate Metal.com, Jeff responded to the band being labeled "avant-garde": "For us, avant-garde is not a classification of music. It is a state of being, a state of becoming... ...once your music can be classified easily, I don't think the word progressive or avant-garde fits. So that's why we mention in our bio that "avant-garde" is an ideal state for us, and not a classification."

== Track listing ==
All tracks are written by Jeff Arwadi.

No.	Title	Length
1.	"Characteristicon"	5:59
2.	"Strength in My Weakness"	4:56
3.	"Thy Neighbor's Morality"	7:25
4.	"A Dream for a Moment"	5:50
5.	"Broken"	4:46
6.	"Envy and Its Manifesto"	5:59
7.	"The Way of Thinking Beyond Comprehension"	8:51
8.	"Romanitika Destruksi"	2:25
9.	"Blessing in Disguise"	5:38
10.	"Empty Space"	4:08

== Line up ==
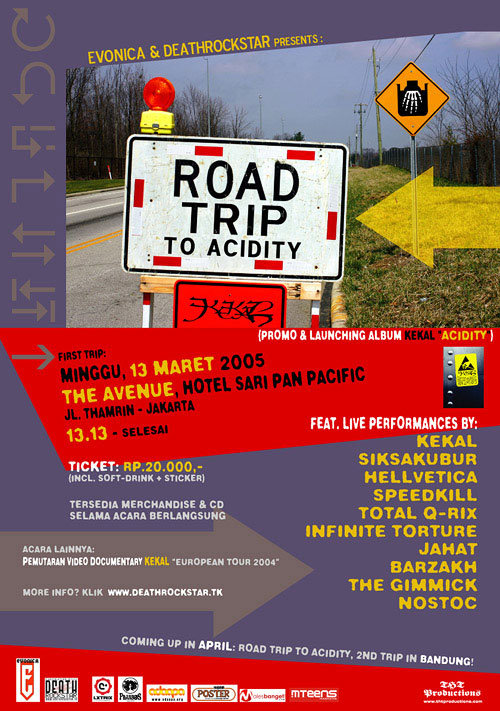
Promotional poster for the album release party at The Avenue, Hotel Sari Pan Pacific, Jakarta, Indonesia

- Jeff Arwadi – vocals, guitars, programming, mixing
- Azharlevi Sianturi – bass, vocals
- Leo Setiawan – guitars
- Newin Atmarumeksa – vocals

With special guests:

- Didi Priyadi of Happy Day – guitars
- Jason DeRon of Paramaecium, Altera Enigma – guitar
- L. Rion – drums
- Hans Kurniawan of Inner Warfare – keys
