= Jason De Ron =

Australian musician (born 1973)

- Born: Jason David De Ron; 1973 (age 52–53); Melbourne, Victoria, Australia
- Genres: Doom metal, death metal
- Occupations: Musician, producer
- Instruments: Guitar, keyboards, bass
- Years active: 1991–present

Jason David De Ron (born 1973) is an Australian musician from Melbourne, best known for being the former guitarist for the death/doom band Paramaecium and co founder and guitarist of the avant garde/progressive metal band Altera Enigma.

== Early life ==
De Ron was born in 1973, he began playing guitar in 1987 after hearing a guitar solo by Dave Murray of Iron Maiden, and joined Paramaecium in 1992. Jason first met Andrew Tompkins in a cemetery one night in 1991. He was there with Colin "Mosh" Mynard who was a friend of his, and Paramaecium's original guitarist. They were there to photograph the grave for the cover of the Silent Carnage demo.

=== Paramaecium ===
Jason got to know Andrew further when he attended a Paramaecium rehearsal as they prepared for an upcoming gig with Mortification. That same night Jason also met Jayson Sherlock and the two have remained close friends ever since. When "Mosh" left Paramaecium in 1992, Andrew spoke to Jason about joining, and after a few meetings and songwriting sessions, they knew it would work. From there they began writing for what would become the album Exhumed of the Earth. Jason recorded the albums Exhumed of the Earth, Within the Ancient Forest, the Repentance EP, and has added some guitar recordings to the latest Paramaecium album Echoes from the Ground. Along with Andrew, Jason transcribed all the music from the first two Paramaecium albums for the music scores.

=== Altera Enigma ===
After the recording of Echoes from the Ground with Paramaecium, Jason alongside Jefray Arwadi of Kekal formed Altera Enigma and recorded a few songs. As both musicians are from different countries it became difficult to play together, both the musicians decided it would be best to send samples of their music to each other via the internet, so this means that both musicians could be recording the same song in two different countries at the same time. After a few months of playing the band invited Kenny Cheong who has once been a guest musician in Kekal, and after recording a few more songs Altera Enigma released Alteration. The album met with success, and the following year drummer Jayson Sherlock, who also used to be in Paramaecium, joined Altera Enigma at the band's invitation.

=== Other projects ===
Jason is also in a progressive rock band called Soundscape alongside Jayson Sherlock and Kenny Cheong, they have released an EP entitled Soundscape EP.

After the disestablishment of Paramaecium after Nordic Fest '06 the remaining members went on to form InExordium, in September 2008 InExordium released their self-titled album. As of 2009, Jason is no longer a member of inExordium.

=== Personal life ===
Jason has been a vegetarian since 1994, and in 2001 became a vegan.

== Discography ==
=== Paramaecium ===
- Exhumed of the Earth (1993)
- Within the Ancient Forest (1996)
- Repentance (EP, 1996)
- Echoes from the Ground (2004)

=== Altera Enigma ===
- Alteration (2006)

=== Soundscape ===
- Soundscape EP (2007)

=== Kekal (guest musician) ===
- Acidity (2005)
- The Habit of Fire - additional guitar on "Escapism" (2007)
