= A Forlorn Throne =

Studio album by Slechtvalk
- Released: May 31, 2010
- Genre: Melodic death metal, Christian metal, Viking Metal
- Length: 61:51
- Label: Whirlwind Records
- Producer: Johan "the ant" Örnborg

Slechtvalk chronology
At the Dawn of War (2005)	A Forlorn Throne (2010)	When Wandering Shadows and Mists Collide (2016)

Professional ratings
Review scores
Source	Rating
Cross Rhythms	8/10 stars
Metal.de	6/10
Powermetal.de	8.50/10

A Forlorn Throne is the fourth full-length album by Slechtvalk released in May 2010.

== Recording ==
The band went to Sweden's Studio Mega in late 2009 with producer Johan "the ant" Örnborg to record A Forlorn Throne. It was mixed and mastered by Jens Bogren at Fascination Street, and the cover artwork as well as a new logo was designed by Raymond Swanland of Oddworld fame. The album was released on May 31, 2010 in the Netherlands, and July 15 elsewhere. Three of the songs feature guest vocals by Erik Grawsiö of Månegarm.

== Track listing ==
1. "Tamers of the Seas" – 4:37
2. "Forsaken" – 8:32
3. "Desolate" – 6:29
4. "Divided by Malice" – 7:11
5. "Allegiance" – 7:53
6. "Enthroned" – 8:32
7. "Bewailed" – 5:19
8. "Towards the Dawn" – 7:35
9. "Vengeance of a Scorned King" – 5:43

== Personnel ==
- Shamgar – vocals, guitars
- Ohtar – guitars, vocals
- Seraph – guitar
- Grimbold – drums, vocals
- Premnath – keyboards
- Erik Grawsiö (Månegarm) – guest vocals
