= Audible Minority =

Studio album by Kekal
- Released: 25 December 2008
- Recorded: The Palace Room Studios, Toronto, Ontario, Canada; Jeff Arwadi's mobile laptop
- Genre: Experimental metal, electronic rock
- Length: 1:05:09
- Label: Self-released, Whirlwind
- Producer: Jeff Arwadi

Kekal chronology
The Habit of Fire (2007)	Audible Minority (2008)	8 (2010)

Audible Minority is the seventh full-length studio album by Indonesian experimental metal band Kekal. According to the band, the album is titled "Audible Minority" because the music on the album is of extreme minority status, and is "entirely bleak, gloom and dark." They also said that the album was constructed over almost two years, during various events in the band members lives. Jeff Arwadi recorded the entire songs on this album all by himself, and started shortly after he moved to Canada in 2006.

There is an official music video for the song "Narrow Avenue".

The album was originally supposed to be released by a now-defunct record label NePlusUltra Music in CD format in December 2008, with the first pressing a special digipak release that was hand-numbered and limited to 777 copies. Unfortunately, the physical release never came about, and the album was released instead as a free digital download on 25 December 2012. In December 2012, four years after the initial release date, the album was finally being released physically, as a bonus-CD of the limited hand-numbered deluxe double-CD edition of a 2012 Kekal album Autonomy, while the free download version had been discontinued in favor of the paid download, which is now made available on the band's Bandcamp page. The A-ha cover song "Locust" is not included on the CD version, but included as a hidden bonus track on the digital download version.

== Track listing ==
All tracks are written by Jeff Arwadi except where noted.

No.	Title	Writer(s)	Length
1.	"The Vampire Song"		6:02
2.	"Conditional Destiny"		6:16
3.	"Against"		5:53
4.	"Ceasefire Negative"		5:43
5.	"Between Us"		6:25
6.	"For the Greater Good and Evil"		7:50
7.	"Narrow Avenue"		4:21
8.	"Virtue of Perseverance"		7:50
9.	"Shuffling Biorhythms"		4:50
10.	"All That Matters"		5:08
11.	"Locust" (A-ha cover)	Paul Waaktaar-Savoy	4:53

== Personnel ==
- Jeff Arwadi
- Azhar Levi Sianturi
- Leo Setiawan

Additional credits:

- Jeff – preparation, sampling, arrangement, performance and programming
- Jeff – production, engineering, mixing and mastering
- Jelena Glisic – additional engineering on "The Vampire Song"
- Darryl Neudorf – production inputs
- Damon de Szegheo – production inputs
