= Alteration (album) =

Studio album by Altera Enigma
- Released: January 2006
- Studio: Studio Vertigo, Melbourne, Australia; Vision Studio, Jakarta, Indonesia
- Genre: Electronica, jazz fusion, progressive metal
- Length: 52:46
- Label: Self-Released
- Producer: Jason DeRon, Jefray Arwadi; Mastered by Jefray Arwadi at Vision Studio

Professional ratings
Review scores
| Source | Rating |
|---|---|
| Matt Morrow | (90/100) |

Alteration is the debut album by Australian/Indonesian band Altera Enigma, recorded over 2 years and released in January 2006. The emotional and sophisticated style found on the album drew comparisons to Liquid Tension Experiment, Gordian Knot, and Cynic.

A music video was released for the bonus/outtake track "Perpetual Motion".

== Style ==
Alteration mainly features a mixture of progressive metal and jazz fusion, but contains many other diverse musical styles such as electronica and dark ambient. Jason DeRon has stated in an interview that while he does not like the term "progressive metal", he feels that it is the closest description that can be used.

== Track listing ==
1. "Enigmatic Alteration" – 9:41
2. "The Infinite Horizon" – 5:21
3. "Pasivitas Sudut Pandang" – 3:46
4. "Fading" – 5:39
5. "NGC 3370" – 6:27
6. "Skyward (Outer Atmosphere)" – 5:22
7. "Relating The Transformation" – 7:37
8. "Unlimited Reality" – 3:12
9. "Through Glass, Darkly" – 5:41
10. "Perpetual Motion" (Outtake/bonus track) – 6:14

== Personnel ==
- Jason DeRon - guitars, bass, keyboard, fx, samples, additional vocals
- Jefray Arwadi - guitars, vocals, samples
- Kenny Cheong - fretless bass
- Paul Reeves - additional rhythm guitars on "NGC 3370" and "Unlimited Reality"
- Safrina Arwadi - additional vocals on "Pasivitas Sudut Pandang"
- Jefray Arwadi/Soundmind Graphics - Cover design, artwork & layout
