= 1000 Thoughts of Violence =

Studio album by Kekal
- Released: February 2003 (Undying Music/Alfa Records, cassette); June 2003 (Fear Dark Records, CD); August 2003 (Rock Express Records, cassette)
- Recorded: September and December 2002, Vision Studio
- Genre: Extreme metal, avant-garde metal, progressive metal, black metal
- Length: 50:17
- Label: Fear Dark Records, Undying Music/Alfa Records
- Producer: Jeff/Kekal

Kekal compilations chronology
Introduce Us to Immortality (2003)

Kekal studio albums chronology
Chaos & Warfare (2002)	1000 Thoughts of Violence (2003)	Acidity (2005)

1000 Thoughts of Violence is the fourth album by Indonesian extreme metal band Kekal, released in 2003. The central theme of the album is moral decline and the violent nature of humanity. This was the first and only major studio album by the band without the skills of additional guitarist Leo Setiawan.

It is one of four albums available for free download on the official website.

== Release & reception ==
Kekal "Violent Society" (2003)
The song "Violent Society", which is noted for containing a hip-hop passage, exemplifies the band's use of contrast between raging intensity and more mellow passages.

Professional ratings
Review scores
Source	Rating
Aardschok	90/100
HM Magazine	favorable
Imperiumi.net	8.5/10 stars
Matt Morrow	9/10 stars
Metal Storm	9/10
Powermetal.de	Extremely favorable
Powerplay Magazine	7/10
"Psych Folk" Radio	Favorable
Rock Hard	8.0/10

While the CD version was released by Fear Dark (Netherlands) to cover most of the bigger distribution channels mainly in Europe, 1000 Thoughts of Violence was also released in cassette versions by Undying Music (Indonesia) and Rock Express Records (Yugoslavia). In Indonesia, the album was distributed by Alfa Records from 2003 to 2004 and became the first album from Kekal being sold in mainstream record stores in the country, and it became the best selling Kekal album to date.

Critical reception was highly favorable. AllMusic noted the album as plunging the band into "ultra-progressive" experiments". According to a review by HM Magazine, Kekal matured greatly since its previous release, The Painful Experience, especially with its vocals. This album found the band experimenting much more than on previous releases, yet also was considered its most cohesive effort to date. The album was noted for switching between raging intensity and more mellow passages, such as the song "Violent Society", which even included a hip-hop passage. Rock Hard rated the album eight out of ten, comparing the album's guitar work to Iron Maiden, Joe Satriani, and Cynic. The band's bass guitar technique in particular was compared to Iron Maiden bassist Steve Harris. Rock Hard noted that the band described themselves as black metal, and labeled the album as metal with a Christian angle but also influenced by mid-1980s power metal. Antwerp-based radio show "Psych Folk" Radio on Radio Centraal viewed the album favorably, mentioning in a broadcast on Indonesian progressive music that 1000 Thoughts of Violence "is a possibility to invite progressive rock listeners to take the challenge to open up their perspectives." On the program's website the album was called an "intelligent listening pleasure for the open minded." Stefan Lang of Powermetal.de viewed that album extremely favorably, calling the album a highlight of the year 2003, while Metal Storm staff member Promonex rated the album nine out of ten. Finnish heavy metal site Imperiumi.net rated the album 8 1/2 out of 10. In 2010 on Powermetal.de, 1000 Thoughts of Violence garnered fourteen points in a retrospective on the year 2003, tying in twenty-third place out of twenty-eight alongside Dimmu Borgir's Death Cult Armageddon, Harem Scarem's Higher, Green Carnation's A Blessing in Disguise, and Arena's Contagion.

== Track listing ==
No.	Title	Length
1.	"Subsession / Once Again It Failed"	4.37
2.	"Vox Diaboli"	4.31
3.	"In Continuum"	5.46
4.	"Paradigma Baru"	2.35
5.	"Artifacts of Modern Insanity"	5.18
6.	"Violent Society"	5.06
7.	"Subsession II"	4.58
8.	"Default"	5.36
9.	"Beyond Numerical Reasons: I. 404; II. 911; III. 70x7"	12.20

== Personnel ==
- Jeff Arwadi – guitars, vocals, additional bass, digital and analog synth orchestrations
- Azhar Levi Sianturi – bass, vocals, additional guitars
- Doctor D – sampling, noises, loops, fx and programming
- Safrina Christina – additional vocals
- Sang Hitam – drum machine
