= Armageddon Holocaust =

Indonesian metal band

- Origin: Jakarta, Indonesia
- Genres: Unblack metal, extreme metal
- Years active: 1999-2000, 2002–2004
- Labels: THT Productions, Bombworks Records
- Past members: Doctor Dark; Meister J. Necro W. Dark Thriller

Armageddon Holocaust was an Indonesian black metal band formed by Doctor Dark and Dark Thriller.

== History ==
Armageddon Holocaust was formed by Doctor Dark and Dark Thriller in 1999 as a one-time project, self-described as Apokalyptic Destruction Metal. In 2000, the band released the debut concept album Into Total Destruction, with lyrics about the future destruction of Earth in the end times based on the Book of Revelation. Jeff Arwadi from Kekalproduced the album. After this release, the band dissolved. In 2002, the two members launched solo projects. Doctor Dark started Doctor D, and Dark Thriller started Disastrous Age. After pressure from THT Productions, they reformed. Dark Thriller later departed the band and Arwadi replaced him.

The second album, Radioactive Zone 245, was planned as a Doctor D release titled D-Liverance, but was merged with Armageddon Holocaust at the request of THT Productions. The album was released in 2003. Into Total Destruction was re-released, as it was THT Production's highest selling album, according to Arwadi, who was a member of the record label's staff. A final album, Nekrofonik, was recorded and released in 2004. Radioactive Zone 245 was available for free download on the band's Reverbnation page. In 2005, all band members left the group, but Armageddon Holocaust continued as a legal entity with an active record deal.

Neither Doctor D or Dark Thriller have revealed their true names, though in an interview with HM Magazine, Doctor D joked that his real name was Bill Clinton. Doctor D was noted by writer Johannes Jonsson as a member of Bealiah, but Doctor D refused to comment on Bealiah in an interview with Art for the Ears webzine.

== Band concept ==
Doctor D and Dark Thriller have stated that Armageddon Holocaust was formed as a project to capture their emotions about the future destruction of Earth and its "false inhabitants" as described in the Book of Revelation. Doctor D has said that while not pessimistic, he believes that the future is dark. Dark Thriller explained to HM Magazine that the "whole concept is based on the Biblical prophecies of the end time, and we try to communicate with the audience of what we want to say, the more number of audiences the better." He elaborated that "[i]t’s the time for all the people to think about themselves and what will happen to this earth. They must be prepared to face the horrors of the future. If anyone says our music is scary, it means they are not ready yet to face reality." Art for the Ears said the band had violent lyrics, to which Doctor Dark responded,

"I have a very strong feeling that we are at the end of time. With all the chaos and violence in my homeland, that give us signs though they are not yet the Armageddon. This feeling made me to come up with the idea of doing music to capture my emotions toward that. I'm a musician and music is a language for my expressions. When I talked to my buddy Dark Thriller, he agreed because he had these emotions too, so we started to do the project together. We see there are no other valid prophetic references about the endtimes rather than from the book of Revelation. A book used by Christians as a part of the Bible but most of them forget the essence that the Earth is near the end. Too many Christians are just appear to be kind of pathetic humans, in which money and all that crap are what they concern about now." – Doctor Dark, Art for the Ears interview

The second album continued in this vein. Arwadi saaid that the lyrics in Radioactive Zone 245 "are mostly about the destruction of Earth, both in smaller or larger scales; the process that mankind has made throughout history, and in the future we ourselves who will reap all that we sow. It’s very dark and seems like it may be too pessimistic, but the message is clearly positive. You cannot go away and forget what we’ve done to this Earth." According to Dark Thriller, the "245" in the title was based on the serial code X5-452 of character Max Guevara in the TV series Dark Angel. "Radioactive Zone" was chosen because it was what came to mind when Dark Thriller heard the final mix.

== Musical style ==
Stylistically, the band has been described as playing a very raw, primitive style of black metal. Its first release, Into Total Destruction, was described as being extreme black metal similar to Horde or early Kekal, and received mixed reviews from critics. The production quality was severely criticized by HM Magazine journalist Matt Morrow, as well as the programmed drumming, which Morrow considered inferior to Kekal's much better drum machine programming. The poor and inconsistent production was one of the main reasons for the album's re-release, which was digitally re-mastered in 24-bit format. Jeff commented on this when talking with HM Magazine, stating "I think this album needed to be re-mastered, because we recorded it under a very poor condition. We had no monitor speakers, just used a cheap headphone for me to master it. But now I have better equipment to improve the sound of the album." The second album, Radioactive Zone 245, branched out from the extreme style of the first. Matt Morrow described it as a mix of "older metal like Bathory, Celtic Frost, and Venom along with a touch of Kekal", saying "[t]his band mixes so many influences on this record that it almost sounds like a different band every song. The strange thing is, it maintains a cohesive feel throughout." Morrow also noted the dark, raw sound of the album and its influence from early thrash. The vocals were described as harsh and ranging from "black to death to somewhat clean, to somewhat retarded."

When asked about their musical influences, Doctor Dark has cited Celtic Frost, Hellhammer, Bathory, Discharge, Venom, Kreator, Destruction, Sodom, Unseen Terror, Motörhead, Exodus, Darkthrone, Burzum, and Bulldozer. Dark Thriller cited his influences as early thrash and death metal bands, and "a few black metal bands like Darkthrone and Horde."

== Lineup ==
- Doctor Dark (1999-2000, 2002–2004) – Guitars, bass, vocals
- Dark Thriller (1999-2000) – Guitars, bass, vocals
- Meister J. (Jeff Arwadi) (1999-2000, 2002–2004) – Guitars, drum machine, production, mixing
- Necro W. (??-2004)

== Discography ==
Studio albums

- Into Total Destruction – 2000
- Radioactive Zone 245 – 2003
- Nekrofonik – 2004
- Dies Irae - 2013

Collaborative

- Self Krusher compilation: 5th Anniversary THT Productions – 2001
