= A Time to Mourn =

1999 studio album by Paramaecium

Studio album by Paramaecium
- Released: 1999
- Recorded: Toyland Recording Studio and The Operating Theatre, Melbourne
- Genre: Death/doom metal
- Length: 40:43
- Producer: Andrew Tompkins

Paramaecium chronology
Repentance (1997)	A Time to Mourn (1999)	Echoes from the Ground (2004)

Professional ratings
Review scores
Source	Rating
HM Magazine	
Multiple reviewers	

A Time to Mourn is the third album by Paramaecium. It was released in 1999. According to Andrew Tompkins the album art is of a Los Angeles model, the band actually does not know who the woman is.

== Themes ==
A Time to Mourn explores themes such as betrayal ("Betrayed Again") and the album also deals with issues related to church life ("Live for the Day") and how we need to make sure that our commitment to a church doesn't override our commitment to God. It makes the point by telling the story of a woman who won't have to think for herself again because she's now a part of the church.

The second song on the album, "I'm Not to Blame" is written from Jesus' perspective and is essentially a comment about the fact that Christians have a tendency to understate the importance of self-control, allowing sin to control their lives and crying out to God to forgive them over and over again without making any effort to alter the behaviour themselves. This is not the behaviour of a repentant individual even though, unfortunately, it is often the mark of a modern Christian. Many Christians cry out to Jesus to give them the strength to resist the temptation to sin. Then, when they succumb to temptation again, it seems to them that Jesus has let them down, that he's to blame. If you ask Jesus to give you the strength to resist sin but go on to sin, part of your mind concludes that Jesus didn't give you the strength. But scripture is clear that you won't be tempted beyond what you can bear which means that there is no excuse for sin. And, even though Christians will continue to sin on a daily basis in some way, the life of the Christian must be one of continual self-improvement: to seek to become more like Christ every single day.

The songs which frame the album are the first and last songs on the CD: "A Moment" and "Unceasing". These songs deal with the paradox of the basis for the understanding of eternal life. Namely, that as Christians we accept that we are not merely mortal but have everlasting life, eternal life beyond the grave, and yet this also means that life as we know it on earth is viewed more as a drop in the ocean of eternity, or as a mere moment in time. Understanding this is one of the first things a new Christian must deal with and this it is the theme for the beginning and conclusion to the album.

== Track listing ==
1. "A Moment" – 3:12
2. "I'm Not to Blame" – 4:44
3. "My Thoughts" – 4:46
4. "Betrayed Again" – 5:16
5. "Enter in Time" – 5:22
6. "Live for a Day" – 9:09
7. "Even the Walls" – 5:03
8. "Unceasing" – 3:11
