= The Habit of Fire =

Studio album by Kekal
- Released: 15 March 2007, Whirlwind Recordings; 15 May 2007, Open Grave Records
- Studios: Vision Studio, Jakarta, Indonesia; Studio Vertigo, Melbourne, Australia; Didi's place, Jakarta, Indonesia; Jeff's Mobile Laptop Recording
- Genres: Ambient, avant-garde metal, electronic, industrial, jazz fusion, rock
- Length: 70:40
- Labels: Whirlwind, Open Grave
- Producers: Jeff Arwadi; Mixed at Vision Studio; Mastered at The Secret Room

Kekal chronology
Acidity (2005)	The Habit of Fire (2007)	Audible Minority (2008)

The Habit of Fire is a 2007 album by Indonesian avant-garde metal band Kekal. Released on 15 May in North America, Japan & Australia and 15 March in Europe & South America, it is their sixth full-length album. The album was constructed during Jeff's move to Canada, and was the last album recorded in his home studio in Indonesia. There is an official music video for the song "Isolated I".

== Concept ==
In an interview with Ultimate Metal.com, Jeff said that "The Habit of Fire is a concept album about the living energy in a human being that has become our archetype of survival... ...The fire itself represents an energy or spirit that can never be taken down by outside forces. The lyrical themes are based around a 12-million people metropolis within a post-dictatorship country, heading down into chaos due to the people's inability to adapt with the global winds of change."

== Recording ==
In the same interview, Jeff said that the recording process was only the second album that the band did not have a single problem in the recording process. About 75% of the music was written during pre-production. Jeff would collect samples and create MIDI information, and manipulate the sounds to create the 'skeleton'. Then riffs, MIDI instruments, synthesizers, and melodies would be added and the structure re-arranged. Once the song structure was set, the guitars would be re-recorded, then bass and drum tracks would be put on top, then vocals. Overall, it took over seven months to complete.

== Reception and style ==
Kekal "Our Urban Industry Runs Monotonously" (2007)
One of the more popular songs from the album, which received high praise from Sound on Sound magazine for its production quality.

Professional ratings
Review scores
Source	Rating
About.com	3.5/5 stars
Cross Rhythms	6/10 stars
HM Magazine	Slightly favorable
PopMatters	7/10 stars
Powermetal.de	Extremely favorable
Sound on Sound	CD of the Month

The Habit of Fire received mixed reception by critics. It was praised for its diverse style and instrumentation as well as its quality musicianship, but was considered repetitive and over-indulgent at times, as well as somewhat inaccessible and difficult to digest. The album was nominated for The Best Avantgarde Metal Album award by the popular metal website Metal Storm, and in November 2007, the album was chosen as the CD of the Month by UK's music technology magazine Sound on Sound.

On this release, the band reduced its black metal sound to make room for atmospheric soundscapes and industrial textures. The music is varied, combining the band's metal roots with styles such as progressive rock, electronica, psychedelic ambient, and jazz fusion, giving the album a "breathless, almost ADD" feel. The experimental aspects of the album were likened to Tool, while the progressive elements were compared to Marillion and the heavier passages to Mortal. PopMatters described the album as "flipping randomly between radio stations playing Rush, King Crimson, Ulver, and the Mars Volta".

== Track listing ==
All tracks are written by Jeff Arwadi.

No.	Title	Music	Length
1.	"Prelude: Worldhate Chronicle"		0:21
2.	"The Gathering of Ants"		5:50
3.	"Isolated I"		5:49
4.	"Manipulator Generals (Part I of Dictatorship); I. Failure Is the System; II. The Precaution of Aftermath; III. Decadence and Excess"		10:47
5.	"Our Urban Industry Runs Monotonously"		4:45
6.	"To Whom It May Concern"		6:01
7.	"Free Association"		4:48
8.	"Historicity and State of Mind (Part II of Dictatorship); I. Repeated Patterns; II. Aftermath"		5:52
9.	"Postlude: Saat Kemarau"	Arwadi	3:55
10.	"A Real Life to Fear About"		7:47
11.	"Escapism; I. What on Earth Am I Here For? II. The Habit of Fire; III. Subterranean Passageways; IV. A Road Above, A Road Ahead; V. Finding A Way to Stand Up Again"		14:39

== Personnel ==
- Jeff Arwadi
- Azhar Levi Sianturi
- Leo Setiawan

=== Guest musicians ===
- Jason DeRon – additional guitar on "Escapism"
- Kenny Cheong – fretless bass on "Escapism"
- Safrina – vocals on "Saat Kemarau"
- Didi Priyadi – additional guitar solo on "Isolated I"
