= Slechtvalk =

Dutch Christian black metal band

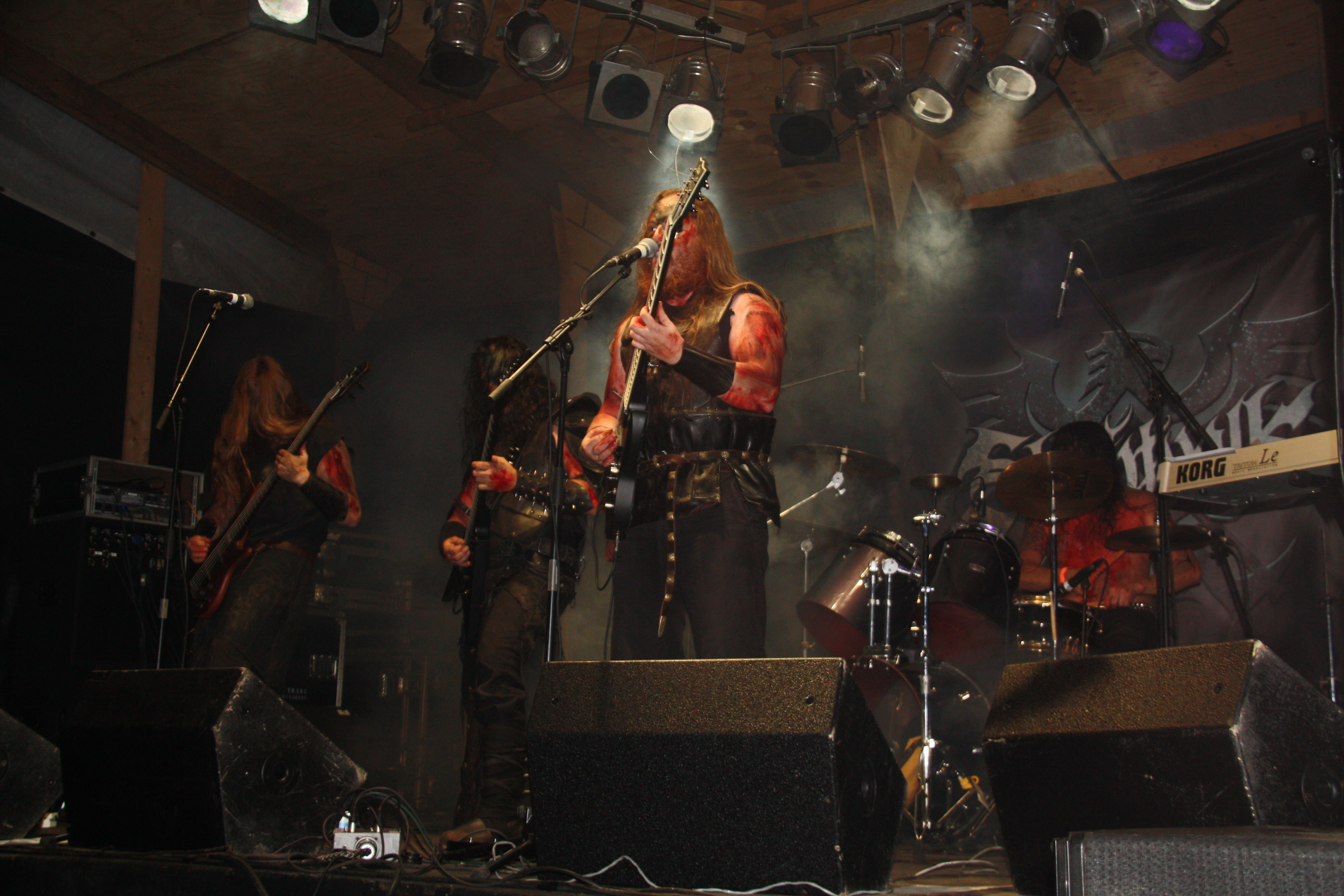
- Slechtvalk at Occultfest 2010

Background information
- Also known as: Dommer
- Origin: The Hague, Netherlands
- Genres: Unblack metal, extreme metal, viking metal
- Years active: 1999–present
- Labels: Fear Dark, Whirlwind
- Members: Shamgar; Ohtar; Premnath; Seraph
- Past members: Hydrith; Fionnghuala; Sorgier; Dagor; Tomrair; Hamar
- Website: slechtvalk.com

Slechtvalk (Dutch for "peregrine falcon") is a Christian black metal band from the Netherlands, formed in 1999. Previously signed to Fear Dark Records and currently to Whirlwind Records, the group has released five albums, a split CD with Kekal, a single, and a DVD. Their second album, The War That Plagues the Lands, reached No. 2 at Lowland's Top 50 Metal Charts. Their third album, At the Dawn of War, coincided with the release of the live DVD Upon the Fields of Battle, a maxi single for "Thunder of War", and was named one of HM Magazine's "100 best Christian metal albums of all time". The band released their fifth album, Where Wandering Shadows and Mists Collide, on December 20, 2016.

== History ==
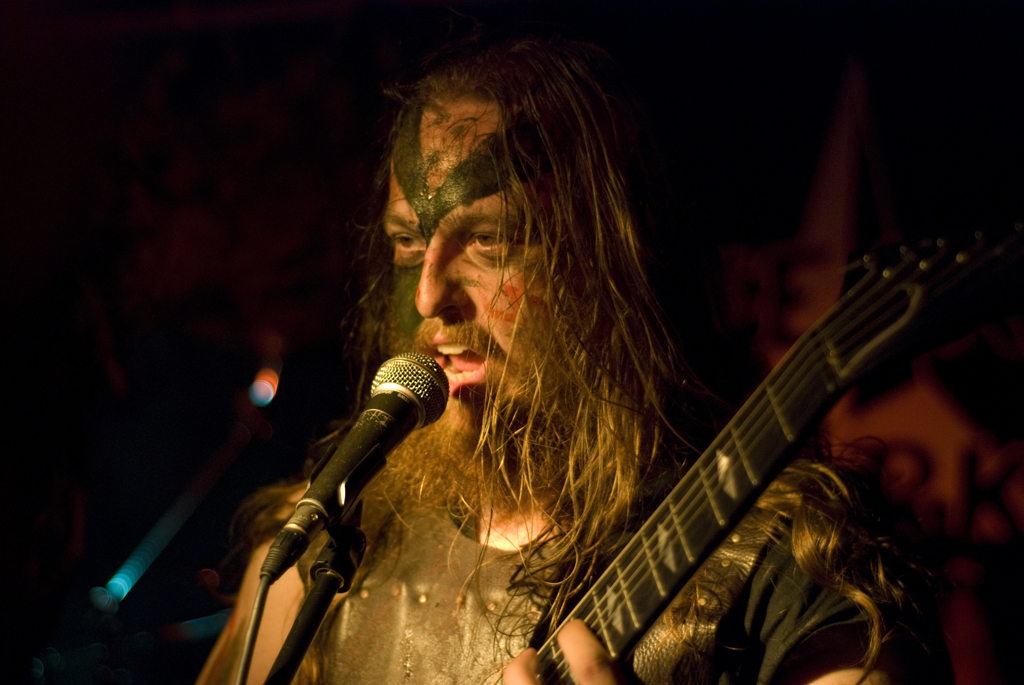
Frontman Shamgar at Fear Dark Fest 2008

Singer/guitarist Shamgar, formerly of Ascension and Mordax, began Slechtvalk as a solo project in 1997. The project was called Dommer (1999–2000) before Shamgar settled on Slechtvalk. Now-defunct Dutch label Fear Dark, which had Eluveitie, Royal Anguish, Taketh, and Kekal on its roster, released debut album, Falconry, in 2000.

Falconry was received positively. Dutch metal magazines, such as Aardschok, interviewed Shamgar. Shamgar formed a full band with soprano singer Fionnghuala, folk singer and rhythm guitarist Ohtar (of Dutch folk metal band Heidevolk), bassist Nath, drummer Grimbold, keyboardist Sorgier, and dancer Meallá.

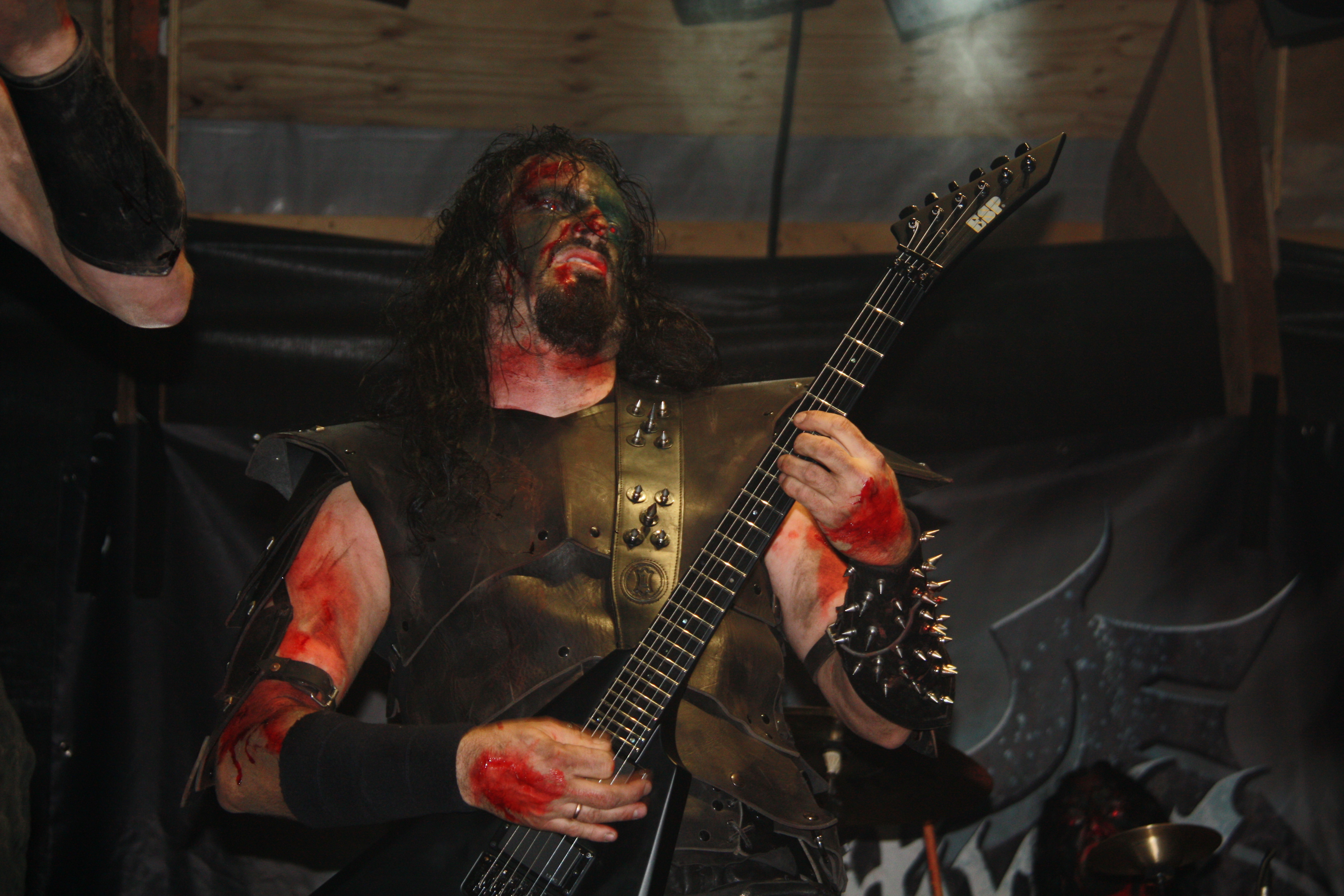
Guitarist Seraph, Occultfest 2010

In 2002, Slechtvalk released their second album, The War That Plagues the Lands. As a teaser, they released a split CD with Kekal from Indonesia (also on Fear Dark). Each band recorded four songs and a cover (Slechtvalk covered Antestor's "Kongsblod", from The Return of the Black Death). The War That Plagues the Lands was well received.

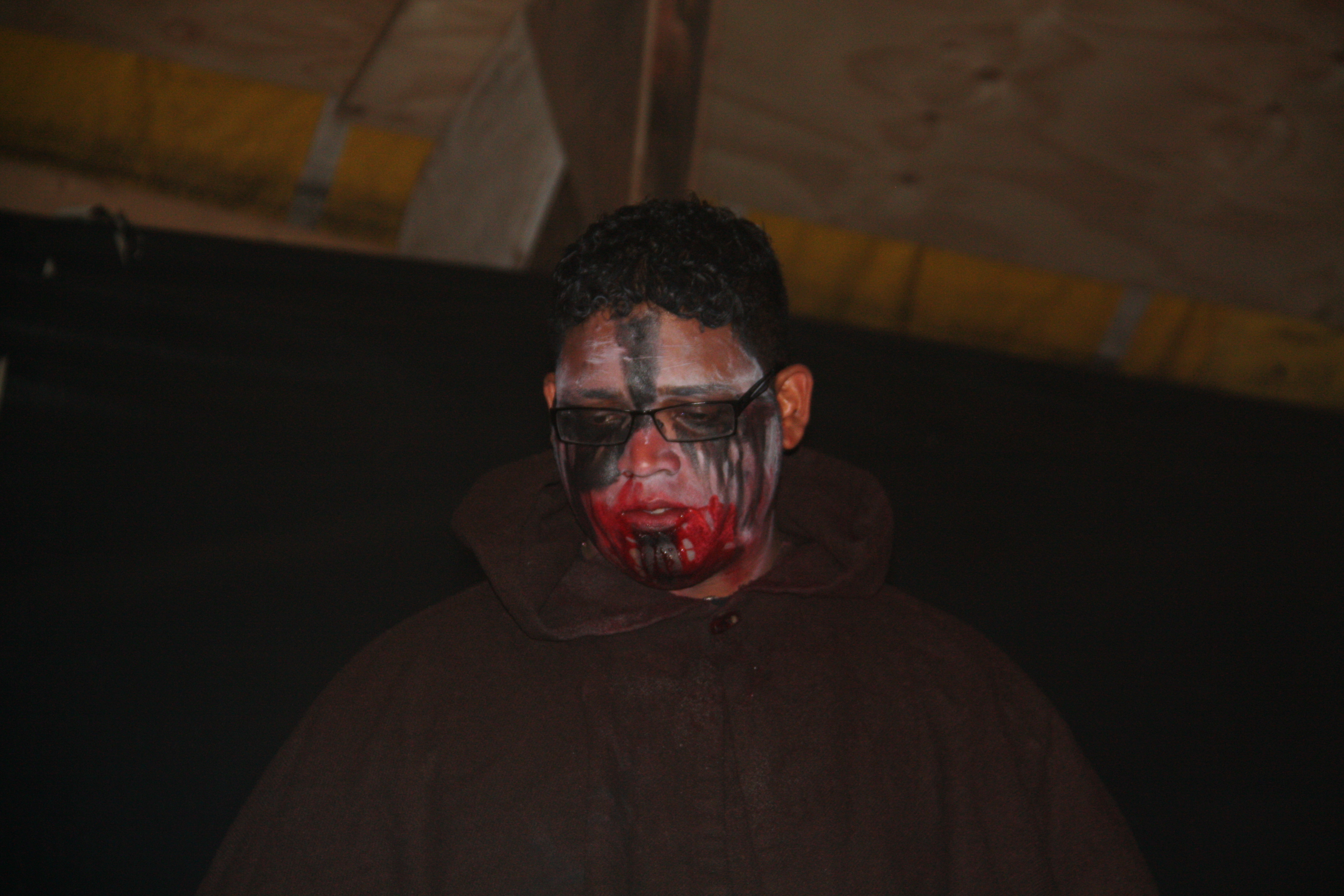
Premnath at Occultfest 2010

In 2005, the band released their third album, At the Dawn of War, with a symphonic sound and folk metal elements. The band incorporated war and fantasy themes to their live shows, and began wearing medieval warrior costumes. That year, Slechtvalk released the live DVD Upon the Fields of Battle, filmed at the club Hedon Zwolle. A music video for "Thunder of War" (also released as a maxi single) received some airplay at local music channels. The band toured several European countries with Frosthardr. In 2010, HM Magazine listed At the Dawn of War as number 60 on its "100 best Christian metal albums of all time".

During early 2006, Grimbold's brother Seraph joined the band as a guitarist, since Ohtar was unable to play the guitar due to a chronic wrist injury. In July 2006, Fionnghuala left the group to focus on classical music. Slechtvalk began writing more technical and brutal material.

In February 2007, bassist Nath was removed from the line-up. Ohtar had recovered and picked up on bass. In late 2007, keyboard-player Hydrith left to focus on family. Since then, Slechtvalk has performed without keyboards or with session musicians.

In April 2009, the band signed with German-based Whirlwind Records. An Era of Bloodshed, a compilation album of the band's past material, with two unreleased promotional songs, was released in October 2009, Whirlwind. Nath—now known as Premnath—re-joined the band as a keyboard-player. The band did a European tour to promote the new album. The tour came to life through financial support from fans, for which the band asked via SellaBand.com. The band went to Sweden's Studio Mega in late 2009 with producer Johan "the ant" Örnborg to record their fourth full-length album titled A Forlorn Throne. It was mixed and mastered by Jens Bogren at Fascination Street, and the cover artwork as well as a new logo was designed by Raymond Swanland.

In 2014, the band released pre-orders for their upcoming album. After that there was no more information until 2016, when the band released a lyric video for the new song "We Are", announcing the album, Where Wandering Shadows and Mists Collide, would be released on December 20.

On June 28, 2024, the band announced on their Facebook page the departure of their drummer Hamar due to a desire to be with family. Following this announcement, in September the band announced their upcoming new album At Death's Gate, which was released on Halloween 2024.

== Festivals ==
In addition to local shows in the Netherlands, Slechtvalk has appeared at several heavy metal music festivals such as Elements of Rock in Switzerland, Bobfest in Sweden, Nordic Fest in Norway, and Interregnum Fest in Germany.

== Lineup ==
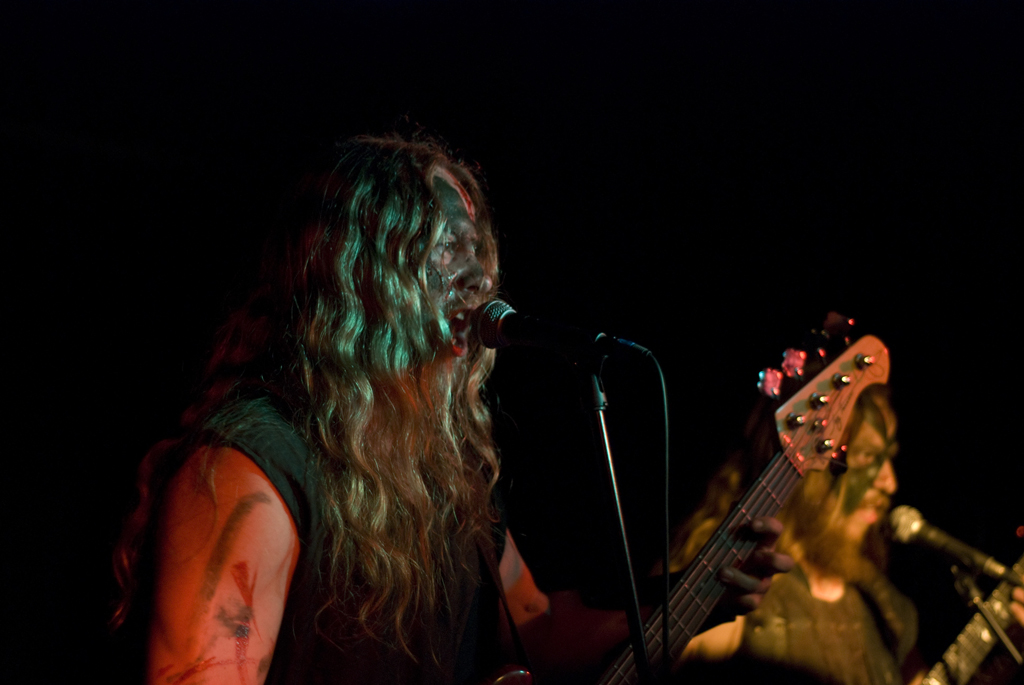
Ohtar and Shamgar live at Fear Dark Festival 2008.

Current members

- Shamgar (Mark Geertsema) – lead vocals, guitar (2000–present), bass, drums, keyboards (2000-2002)
- Seraph (Jos Lucas) – guitar (2010–present)
- Ohtar (Jesse Vuerbaert) – vocals (2011–present), guitar, backing vocals (2002-2011) (does not tour)
- Premnath (Premnath Gonesh) – keyboards (2010–present), bass (2002-2010, 2024–present)

Former members

- Hydrith – keyboards (2003-2007)
- Fionnghuala – soprano (2002-2010)
- Sorgier – keyboards (2002-2003)
- Dagor (Nick van Liempd) – bass (2011–2021)
- Tomrair (Cullen Toner) - bass (2021-2024)
- Grimbold (Jan-Paul Lucas) – drums, backing vocals (2002-2017)
- Hamar (Joël de Jong) – drums (2017–2024)

Timeline

== Discography ==
- Falconry (2000)
- The War That Plagues the Lands (2002)
- At the Dawn of War (2005)
- A Forlorn Throne (2010)
- Where Wandering Shadows and Mists Collide (2016)
- At Death's Gate (2024)

=== Other releases ===
- Chaos & Warfare (split-CD with Kekal, 2002 Fear Dark Records)
- Upon the Fields of Battle (DVD, 2005 Fear Dark Records)
- Thunder of War (CD-single, 2005 Fear Dark Records)
- An Era of Bloodshed (compilation album, 2009)
- We Are (single, 2016)
- Paralyzed by Fear (single, 2024)
