= Chaos & Warfare =

Compilation album by Kekal/Slechtvalk
- Released: 2002
- Genre: Heavy metal, black metal, symphonic black metal
- Length: 40:04
- Label: Fear Dark Records

Kekal chronology
The Painful Experience (2001)	Chaos & Warfare (2002)	1000 Thoughts of Violence (2003)

Slechtvalk chronology
Falconry (2000)	Chaos & Warfare (2002)	The War That Plagues the Lands (2002)

Chaos & Warfare is a split album between the bands Kekal, from Indonesia, and Slechtvalk, from the Netherlands, released in 2002 through Fear Dark Records.

== Critical reception ==
Professional ratings
Review scores
Source	Rating
Lords of Metal	63/100
Matt Morrow	9/10 stars
Metal Storm	8/10

Reception was fairly positive, though Kekal's side drew some criticism. HM Magazine writer Matt Morrow disliked the band's clean vocals, arguing they should have stuck to black metal, and panned "A Stranger So Close". Some parts were praised. "Mean Attraction", from The Painful Experience, was called a "hit", and Morrow, who rated it the best track on that album, didn't mind its inclusion here. He also admired Kekal's "emotional" and "passionate" cover of the Trouble song "The Skull", and concluded the band was very talented but held back by its experimentation. Michiel de Rooij of Lords of Metal praised "The Only Sound of Rain" and "A Stranger So Close", but found "Mean Attraction" boring and hated the Trouble cover, as he already disliked the original band.

Morrow highly praised Slechtvalk, whose appearance he had been anticipating. He criticised the drum machine on "Whispers in the Dark", but said the next three songs, with real drumming, left him speechless. On the cover of "Kongsblood", originally by Antestor, he felt Slechtvalk did a great job but preferred the atmosphere of the original. de Rooij praised "Whispers in the Dark" but felt "The Dragon's Children" and "Storms" fell short, calling "Storms" rushed and unoriginal, though not bad. "Kongsblood" he lavished with praise as the best track on the split, writing "I've just listened to it tree [sic] times to obtain a good impression…. and I think I'm going to listen to it once more." In an Art for the Ears interview, Slechtvalk founder Shamgar said that while he liked "Storms", he preferred the material on the follow-up The War That Plagues the Lands.

Overall, Morrow gave it nine out of ten; de Rooij rated it 63/100; and Promonex of Metal Storm graded it eight out of ten.

== Style ==
Stylistically, Slechtvalk played black metal for most of the album, with "The Dragon's Children" described as a "brutal, pure black metal song" without any keyboards, while the song "Storms" delved into a symphonic black metal style using extremely fast blasting and a mixture of black and death metal vocals.

== Track listing ==
Kekal
No.	Title	Original artist	Length
1.	"The Only Sound of Rain"		6:13
2.	"Mean Attraction"		4:12
3.	"A Stranger So Close"		5:32
4.	"The Skull"	Trouble	5:54

Slechtvalk
No.	Title	Original artist	Length
5.	"Whispers in the Dark"		4:24
6.	"The Dragon's Children"		3:31
7.	"Storms"		4:02
8.	"Kongsblod"	Antestor	5:53
