= Kekal =

Indonesian metal band

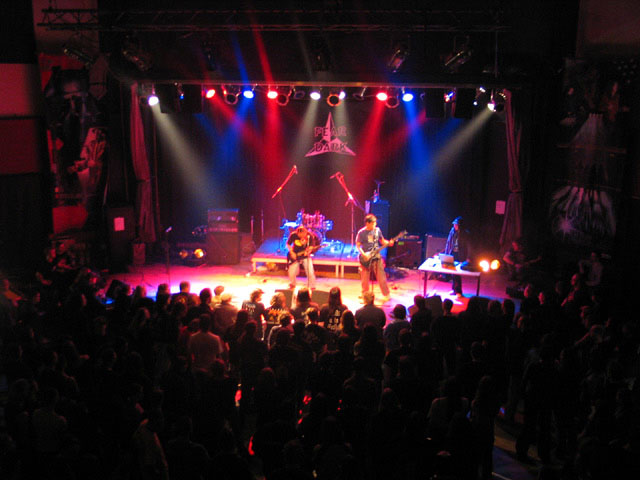
- Kekal in concert at Alter Gasometer, Zwickau, Germany in 2004

Background information
- Origin: Jakarta, Indonesia
- Genres: Avant-garde metal; progressive metal; experimental rock; electronic; black metal
- Years active: 1995–present
- Labels: THT, Whirlwind, Fear Dark, Majemuk, Hitam Kelam, Yes No Wave, Persetan, Elevation, Eastbreath, Open Grave, Clenchedfist, Sonic Wave, HROM, Rock Express
- Past members: Jeff Arwadi; Azhar Levi Sianturi; Leo Setiawan; Harry; Newin Atmarumeksa "Newbabe"; Yeris
- Website: kekal.org

Kekal is an Indonesian extreme metal and electronic music band formed in 1995 in Jakarta. According to AllMusic, Kekal was one of the first heavy metal bands from Indonesia to achieve international success, and, according to heavy metal sociologist Keith Kahn-Harris, was one of the few extreme metal bands from Southeast Asia to make more than a minimal impression on the global scene. Founded by two musicians, Newin Atmarumeksa "Newbabe" and Yeris, the band underwent lineup changes in its early years but emerged with its most enduring lineup of guitarist/vocalist Jeff Arwadi, bassist Azhar Levi Sianturi, and guitarist Leo Setiawan. Over the course of its career, Kekal has transitioned from a black metal-based style into progressive metal, avant-garde metal, and electronic music, incorporating other genres, such as ambient, jazz fusion, and progressive rock.

The band released its first studio album, Beyond the Glimpse of Dreams, in 1998, followed by Embrace the Dead in 1999. Setiawan left for Australia before the recording of 2001's The Painful Experience. After its fourth studio album, 1000 Thoughts of Violence, in 2003, the band, consisting of Arwadi and Sianturi, with Safrina as touring member, embarked on a 2004 mini-tour of Europe. Setiawan rejoined the band in time for its fifth album, Acidity (2005). Atmarumeksa also briefly rejoined the band to record on that album and some compilations. With the band once again a trio, two more albums followed, The Habit of Fire (2007) and Audible Minority (2008). In 2009, the three members of Kekal left the band, but it has continued as a legal entity. Former members contribute material and the band continues to release new albums. Since 2015, all musical contributions to new recordings remain anonymous. The band has released thirteen full-length studio albums, four EPs, several compilations, and contributed to various collaborative or compilation albums.

== History ==
=== Early years (formation to 2002) ===
In 1990, when 16-year-old musician Jeff Arwadi formed the self-styled "punkish thrash metal" band Obliteration with high school friends. Arwadi quit this group in 1991 to improve his guitar playing. Kekal was officially formed on 15 August 1995, by two members using the pseudonyms Yeris and Newbabe (the latter revealed years later as Newin Atmarumeksa), as a straightforward extreme metal band. Newbabe coined the name Kekal, which is Indonesian for 'Immortal' or 'Eternal'. The band was intended to be a one-time project, and recruited a vocalist known as "Harry" to record a four-song demo tape. This demo began caught the attention of future guitarist Leo, who had been in a Metallica and Megadeth cover band.

In June 1996, Azhar Sianturi joined Kekal and the band recorded its official demo, Contra Spiritualia Nequitiae, with Arwadi's songwriting and production. Arwadi was also a member of the group Inner Warfare. According to Arwadi, the demo was recorded in his bedroom with a Fostex X-28 4-track tape recorder and a karaoke microphone. To create reverb during vocal takes, they placed a bucket over the microphone head. Through underground tape trading circles and local fanzines, the demo caught the attention of the metal scene outside Indonesia and Southeast Asia, and record labels began offering deals. Later that year, Leo Setiawan joined the band, and in April 1997, Kekal began to record its self-produced debut album, Beyond the Glimpse of Dreams, released in 1998. The album was licensed to and released by two record labels, THT Productions in Indonesia and Candlelight Productions in Singapore.

Harry left the band after this recording. The remaining trio released Embrace the Dead the next year. Arwadi has expressed disappointment with the album's style, which was designed to appeal to mainstream audiences, and the recording sessions, which inspired the title of the band's next album, The Painful Experience. The following year, the band contributed to a Living Sacrifice tribute album with a cover of "Mind Distant". In October 2001, the band's third album, The Painful Experience, was released. Leo Setiawan left the band before recording and moved to Melbourne, Australia, but he was listed on the album credits as a guitarist due to his contribution on the album's songwriting and general concept. In 2002, the band became a duo. It recorded the split album Chaos & Warfare with Dutch band Slechtvalk, and recorded a cover of "God Rest Ye Merry Gentlemen" for the compilation album Brutal Christmas: The Season in Chaos.

=== International scene (2003–2006) ===
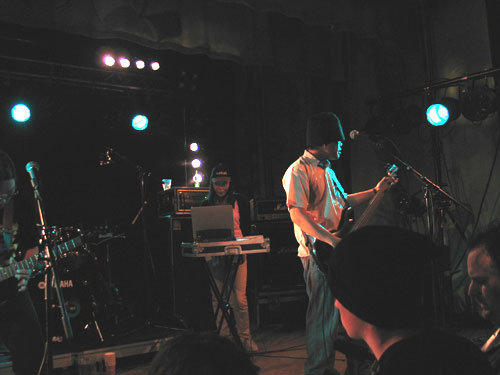
Kekal was noted for playing live for Bobfest at Cupolen, Linköping, Sweden, on 5 March 2004.

In 2003, without guitarist Setiawan, Arwadi and Azhar Levi recorded a cover of "Dance Macabre" for the well-received Cradle of Filth tribute album Covered in Filth, and shortly after, they released the progressive and experimental 1000 Thoughts of Violence, which was also well received, rated eight out of ten by Rock Hard, and regarded as a highlight of 2003 by Powermetal.de. A best-of collection of Kekal's works and re-recordings of Kekal, Introduce Us to Immortality, was released that year. Also that year, the Antwerp-based radio show "Psych Folk" Radio on Radio Centraal mentioned Kekal in that show's programs on progressive music in Indonesia. The success of 1000 Thoughts of Violence was followed up by a two-week European mini-tour, arranged and promoted by the band's record label in Europe at the time, Fear Dark. In March 2004, the band, consisting of Arwadi, Levi, and Arwadi's wife Safrina on programming, played a string of shows in the Netherlands, Germany and Sweden. That month, the band was featured in the Dutch magazine Aardschok. That year, they released Spirits of the Ancient Days, a collection of early Kekal demo songs.

Back in Indonesia, Kekal recorded a fifth album, Acidity. The album marked Setiawan's return and vocal contributions from founding member Newbabe. Session guitarist Didi Priyadi joined and played in some local shows as an additional live guitarist. Acidity was well received and Kekal was again noted by "Psych Folk" Radio. In 2006, the band started recording their sixth album, The Habit of Fire. In 2006, Arwadi leaked two cover songs, "The Prow", originally by Voivod, and "Juices Like Wine", originally by Celtic Frost, both of which were recorded in 2005.

=== Jeff's move to Canada (2006–2008) ===
In 2006, after recording The Habit of Fire, Arwadi moved to Canada while the rest of the members were in Indonesia, precluding the band from playing shows or touring. At the same time, they left their longtime record label, Fear Dark, and the status of the band was in question. After few months of uncertainty and rumors of a break-up, they remained together to keep the band as a studio project. They signed licensing deals with two record labels to release The Habit of Fire in 2007. The album was well received and named CD of the Month by UK's music technology magazine Sound on Sound, as well as being nominated for The Best Avantgarde Metal Album in 2007 by Metal Storm. In 2007, Arwadi leaked another cover, "Redemption", originally planned as part of a Johnny Cash tribute album by Open Grave Records that was shelved. Later in 2007, Arwadi announced on the band's Myspace blog that a new Kekal album was on the way, which he had been working on by himself.

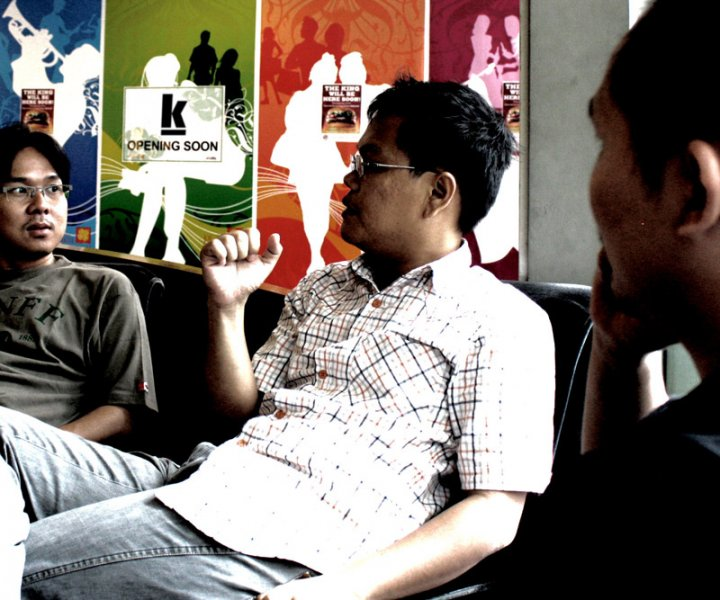
Audible Minority album session - 2008

It was revealed later on that the new album, Audible Minority, would be released officially on 25 December 2008 as two versions: a free download and a limited edition Digipak with 11 songs, including a cover of the A-ha's "Locust". The Digipak version was never released, and the album ended up a free download instead.

=== Departure of band members (2009) ===
In March 2009, Levi left Kekal. Arwadi said that although this closed a door, Kekal would continue in a "new era" of the band's history. On 12 August 2009, Arwadi announced that he and Setiawan had left Kekal, and the band would continue without active members. He said that, as well as unspecified personal reasons, he left the band because, after being closer to nature and in a less densely populated city in Canada, he was unable to continue to make dark, angry metal music. Shortly after, Kekal offered three albums for free download on its website, including its best-selling album to date, 1000 Thoughts of Violence. To address fan confusion, the band issued a statement on its official Facebook page, "KEKAL IS NOT DEAD!!!! When Jeff left Kekal it doesn't mean the band is dead!" The band remains active without official members, its pages being maintained by a volunteer collective and all music contributed by former members of the band, and then, after 2012, anonymously.

=== Current activity (2010–present) ===
Kekal "Tabula Rasa" (2010)
The song "Tabula Rasa" was released as a music video and for streaming on 15 February 2010, and was included on Kekal's eighth studio album 8. At the time of the song's release, the album was still in development and was untitled.

On 13 January 2010, Kekal announced that a new album was in the works, and that former members Arwadi, Setiawan, and Levi were contributing. On 15 February, Arwadi posted a music video on his YouTube channel for a then-untitled new album. The music video was for the song "Tabula Rasa", which was also released for streaming.

On 15 August 2010, a remastered, limited-edition version of the band's second album, Embrace the Dead, was released as a free-download for up 1000 downloads to celebrate the band's 15-year anniversary. Kekal's album 8 was available for pre-order on 22 December 2010 by Whirlwind Records, and was released on 23 January 2011.

On 2 March 2011, Arwadi announced on the Kekal Facebook page that he and Setiawan were recording new music and another album would probably be released sometime in 2012. On 26 April, Arwadi uploaded a music video for the song "Futuride" from the upcoming EP, which was promised to be released in July. The EP, Futuride, was released in July 2011. In addition to two standalone songs, the EP contained three trackings from "Tabula Rasa" made available for public use under Creative Commons Attribution Non-Commercial Share Alike license. On 24 February 2012, Kekal announced the title of its ninth studio album, Autonomy, released on 19 December 2012, first as a limited, hand-numbered deluxe-edition double-CD with the 2008 album Audible Minority (previously unreleased on CD) as a bonus disc. On 29 June 2013, Autonomy was released by Indonesian netlabel Yes No Wave Music as a free digital download but restricted to Indonesian market only.

On March 19, 2013, Kekal released the EP Unsung Division. The band's tenth studio album, Multilateral, was released in 2015. In December 2016, the band announced an album for 2018, Deeper Underground, and a single, "Root of All Evil", set for release in 2017. Kekal's eleventh studio album, Quantum Resolution, was released in 2020, and a twelfth studio album, Envisaged, was released in 2022.

== Music ==
=== Style ===
Kekal "Violent Society" (2003)
"Violent Society" from 1000 Thoughts of Violence was noted for containing a hip-hop passage, and exemplifies the band's use of contrast between raging intensity and more mellow passages.

Kekal "Our Urban Industry Runs Monotonously" (2007)
One of the more popular songs from Kekal's album The Habit of Fire, which received high praise from Sound on Sound magazine for its production quality.

Although mainly known as a progressive metal and avant-garde or experimental metal band, Kekal has stylistic origins in extreme metal, particularly black metal, but even with its debut album the band demonstrated a unique style. Beyond the Glimpse of Dreams featured a varied sound of black and death metal and incorporated a range of vocal styles such as high pitched black metal shrieks, death growls, and female singing. On Embrace the Dead, Kekal used a combination of black metal with death, classic, and doom metal elements and included hints of Gothic and dark wave.

The third album, The Painful Experience, saw the band fusing its black metal style with progressive metal and included elements of thrash, classic, and power metal. Mark Allan Powell described that most of the band's songs were midtempo to fast with a heavy, guitar-driven style, though the band incorporated "certain elements of variety into the sound."

On its fourth, highly technical album, 1000 Thoughts of Violence, the band plunged into ultra-progressive experiments, The album was noted for switching between raging intensity and more mellow passages, such as the song "Violent Society", which even included a hip-hop passage. Powermetal.de noted that the band had become more progressive and lost some of its toughness and aggression. "Psych Folk" Radio viewed the album favorably, mentioning that 1000 Thoughts of Violence "is a possibility to invite progressive rock listeners to take the challenge to open up their perspectives." In March 2004, Aardschok Magazine described the band's albums as a mix of black, heavy, and progressive metal, being grounded in the extreme metal scene.

On its fifth album, Acidity, Kekal used double bass drum blasts and saw the band incorporating styles such as electronic, black metal, progressive metal, progressive rock, classic rock, indie rock, psychedelic rock, trip hop, jazz, ambient, and avant-garde. Jeff Arwadi responded to the "avant-garde" label in an interview with Ultimate Metal.com: "For us, avant-garde is not a classification of music. It is a state of being, a state of becoming... ...once your music can be classified easily, I don't think the word progressive or avant-garde fits. So that's why we mention in our bio that 'avant-garde' is an ideal state for us, and not a classification."

On the next album, The Habit of Fire, the band maintained its use of various music styles such as electronica, ambient, and jazz fusion, but began to shed its black metal roots and introduced atmospheric soundscapes and an industrial vibe. PopMatters described the album as mixing black metal, noise rock, progressive rock, and jazz fusion. With the 2010 album 8, the first album by the band without any active members, Metal Hammer Germany noted that the band was now far away from its early black metal days. Powermetal.de described the band as avant-garde tinged post-rock, with the album being predominantly electronic, but stated that "experimental" was the simplest description of the album. The reviewer, Björn Backes, made comparisons to The Prodigy and The Chemical Brothers and noted the use of "weird" arrangements, post-rock mood swings and alternative guitar sound. Sonic Seducer called the album simply avant-garde and described the band as loving triplets, polyrhythms, and complex beats.

=== Influences ===
Kekal has identified itself with the punk rock and early 1980s metal scenes, and considers itself a "street-progressive" band that is aesthetically more akin to Sonic Youth or The Mars Volta than to technically oriented bands like Dream Theater. The band claims roots in 1980s forms of heavy metal as pioneered by bands like Iron Maiden, Bathory, Trouble, Helloween, Celtic Frost, Sodom, Death, and Massacre. Dimebag Darrell and Quorthon have also been cited as influences. The band is also influenced by a diverse array of other music genre, including progressive rock and metal, post-rock, indie rock, hip hop, jazz, R&B, ambient, and electronica, and cites numerous other musicians from within and without heavy metal as influences, including King Crimson, Camel, Rush, Chick Corea, Pat Metheny, Gary Moore, Eddie Van Halen, Deep Forest, Kitarō, Black Sabbath, Enya, Maire Brennan, Sarah McLachlan, Cocteau Twins, Savatage, Kreator, Paradise Lost, Duran Duran, U2, and Marillion.

=== Songwriting and recording techniques ===
Jeff has stated that starting from the album The Painful Experience they incorporated their own approach to record drum tracks in the studio which they call "hybrid drums", a mix of real-time performance and software-based matrix programming. He also mentioned the efficiency of using the hybrid drumming compared with getting a drummer: "About the drummer, it is still very hard to find a right drummer because Kekal music is ranging from very extreme-metal with blast beats and fast double-kicks, to powerful rock beats that demand steady tempo, and to some polyrhythmic playing and time-signature shifts in the characteristics of jazz and prog drumming. We would need 2 or 3 kinds of drummer for Kekal. That's why the best thing for the recording is to make the hybrid drumming." In other interview, Jeff mentioned the process of recording of The Habit of Fire, starting from collecting samples and creating MIDI information, then manipulating the sounds to create what he called the 'skeleton'. Then riffs, MIDI-triggered instruments, synthesizers, and melodies would be added and the structure re-arranged once again. Once the song structure was set, the guitars would be re-recorded, then bass and drum tracks would be put on top, then vocals. Jeff also mentioned during the interview about the 2011 Futuride EP, that he has experimented with additive synthesis on the recent songs he has recorded and uses guitars to counterbalance the sounds generated by the additive synthesis.

== Ethics and ideological stance ==
=== Kekal and anarchism ===
Kekal claims to have practiced anarchism since the beginning of its career, which in their own words "translates to non-hierarchical and anti-authoritarian approach to self-governing/self-managing", including voluntary contribution, free association and a strong DIY ethic. Kekal never grants copyrights of the band's recording masters to any record labels (since 2010 all the music has been published through Creative Commons license) and has 100% artistic control over music, production and artwork. Kekal has recorded and produced most of its albums in its own studio/workstation, manages the band itself, does its own photo sessions, and designs its own album artwork and covers. As Jeff stated, "So far, we've been known as an independent band who never want to get signed by record label, to maintain our independency and control over our artistic freedom, and also to own our recording masters and copyright. Instead of band signing, we always prefer to license our finished albums to record labels." In another interview, Jeff added his point on Kekal's stance as a band: "...we are non-conformists, musical anarchists. We hate being trendy and we never try to be the same with the rest of the scene. People can love us or hate us, I don't care."

=== Kekal and Christianity ===
Kekal has been described by AllMusic as one of the first black metal bands to profess Christian beliefs. In a 2020 interview with Metal Storm, Jeff Arwadi, in response to the label of "Christian band", said that to him, Christian metal was a brand created to provide a "safe" market for children and youth groups as an exclusive alternative to a "harmful" non-Christian market. And for him, such a brand does not make sense. (Note: Jeff: [...] Then later on, as these kids were looking around for any music with the Christian content, some players within the music industry started to see how they could also create the box, which they could also play around and make good chunks of money by keeping as many people as possible within that box by signing "Christian bands", either real or posers, of various genres exclusively as "the safe alternative to these kids" and kept them away from listening to other bands that they perceive as "harmful", and built the exclusive scene instead of reaching out. It is very easy for them to market within a specific target audience who only listen to one particular type of music out of fear, especially if the number of people within the religious belt is large enough to exploit, like in the U.S. for example, where so-called "Christian bands" could make a living just from playing in churches and youth summer camps across the country. It's pretty much like an alternative world that is disconnected to the main one. I found it to be silly and tragic at the same time, but it's how the whole religious business works over there.)

The band's lyrical material for the 2020 album entitled Quantum Resolution has many Gnostic Christian references from the Nag Hammadi library writings such as Gospel of Thomas, also another noncanonical scripture known as Gospel of Mary, and the recognition regarding the world and this material universe as holographic or projection.

Jeff Arwadi, in particular, has expressed his belief that Christianity is not a religion. During the 2017 interview, he considered himself as a Christian Anarchist and mentioned that he personally opposes the concept of religion, its dogma and hierarchical structure of authority within the church organization. The lyrics on the song called "Rotten in The House" reflect his opposition, which he describes in a 2018 interview: "Oftentimes, people choose to involve deeply into religion not because they want spiritual growth, but just to get away from the life of misery that they experience everyday, an escapism, so that they can 'reverse' their experience to become somewhat 'positive' for them and even 'empower' them. It's almost the same as the use of drugs in order to make you relax, to 'help' you get a good sleep, get high and forget all the problems for a moment. But the danger is also present, like in drugs, religion could become an addictive agent. Its application could gradually damage human sanity, common-sense and conscience." In one interview, Jeff clarified that for him personally, faith is something that drives the human life, and, just like diet and exercise, does not have to be associated with religion whatsoever. In a 2020 interview, he stated that in 2015 and 2016, he underwent what he believes to be a spiritual awakening. He described the revelations he received in these experiences as "Gnosis".

== Members ==
Former members

- Jeff Arwadi – guitar, vocals, programming, drum machine, samples & loops (1995–2009)
- Azhar Levi Sianturi – bass, vocals (1996–2009)
- Leo Setiawan – guitar (1996–2001, 2005–2009)
- Harry – vocals (1995–1998)
- Newin "Newbabe" Atmarumeksa – bass, vocals (1995–1996, 2004–2005)
- Yeris – guitar, vocals (1995–1996)

Guest musicians

- Didi Priyadi – session and live guitar, live vocals
- Kenny Cheong – fretless bass
- Jason DeRon – guitar
- Doctor D – vocals, noises and samples, programming
- Safrina Christina – vocals, keyboards, programming
- Hans Kurniawan (Inner Warfare) – keyboard
- Habil Kurnia – keyboards, engineering, mixing
- Julie – female vocals
- Hana – female vocals
- Vera – female vocals

Timeline

- Note: As of 8 August 2009, Kekal has no active members, but former members and anonymous contributors continue to record and contribute content for the band. Therefore, this timeline of the band lineup ceases for any releases after 2012.

== Discography ==
- Beyond the Glimpse of Dreams – 1998
- Embrace the Dead – 1999
- The Painful Experience – 2001
- 1000 Thoughts of Violence – 2003
- Acidity – 2005
- The Habit of Fire – 2007
- Audible Minority – 2008
- 8 – 2010
- Autonomy – 2012
- Multilateral - 2015
- Deeper Underground - 2018
- Quantum Resolution - 2020
- Envisaged - 2022

== See also ==
- Anarchism in Indonesia
- List of Indonesian rock bands
