= Introduce Us to Immortality =

Compilation album by Kekal
- Released: 2003
- Recorded: 1995–2003
- Genre: Unblack metal, melodic black metal, extreme metal, progressive metal
- Length: 1:06:56
- Label: THT Productions; SystemMortal Productions

Kekal compilations chronology
Introduce us to Immortality (2003)	Spirits from the Ancient Days (2004)

Professional ratings
Review scores
Source	Rating
Matt Morrow	8/10 stars

Introduce Us to Immortality is the first compilation album by extreme progressive metal band Kekal. It is a best-of collection of works and re-recordings by the band dating from 1995 to 2003. Several tracks were digitally re-mastered at 24-bit processing, and two of the tracks were previously unreleased. The album included a full-color professional booklet cover, which contained a history of the band's progression from their first demo to their latest full-length album 1000 Thoughts of Violence. According to the band, the purpose of the album was to give fans of the band a chance to hear earlier Kekal material, much of which was sold out.

== Track listing ==
No.	Title	Length
1.	"Source of Existence" (re-recorded, previously unreleased)	4:54
2.	"The Only Sound of Rain"	6:16
3.	"Mean Attraction"	4:15
4.	"Embrace the Dead" (remastered)	5:23
5.	"Default"	5:33
6.	"A Day the Hatred Dies" (remastered)	5:57
7.	"Crave for Solid Ground"	5:09
8.	"Healing" (remastered)	3:22
9.	"Behind Those Images" (remastered)	3:14
10.	"Millennium" (remastered)	9:16
11.	"Rotting Youth" (remastered)	3:27
12.	"The Painful Experience"	7:53
13.	"Introduce Me to Immortality" (remix, previously unreleased)	2:17
