= Radio Centraal =

Radio station in Antwerp, Belgium

Antwerp; Belgium
- Frequency: 106.7 MHz

Programming
- Format: Freeform

History
- First air date: October 31, 1980
- Former frequencies: 103.9 MHz

Technical information
- Transmitter coordinates: 51°13′12.52″N 4°23′47.68″E

Links
- Webcast: Webstream
- Website: www.radiocentraal.be

Radio Centraal is a Belgian "underground" radio station in the old city center of Antwerp. It began broadcasting on 31 October 1980 on 103.9 FM as one of the first pirate radio stations which started around the country in protest against the broadcasting monopoly of the national state networks. It always was and still remains an independent radio project with many experimental programmes and niche music. The station is structured as a not-for-profit organisation. The contributors are all volunteers and all the on-air talent finance the investment and cover the running costs of the project. In this way, Radio Centraal can stay independent from local government or commercial sponsors. Most programming is in Dutch, but there are many programmes in English and other languages. The station offers a starting platform for aspiring, ambitious and creative radio broadcasters, who are given licence to experiment in sound, editorial, music, reportage and language. Several have gone on to have careers in Belgian national media. Original founder members such as Jan Balliauw and Stefan Blommaert now work at VRT television as international correspondents.

Since the studio is located close to the Steen on the river front boulevard, Radio Centraal can be said to have its fingers on the pulse of a living city. It has organised and supported many inner city cultural activities, parties and "art" radio projects over the years.
