= Autonomy (album) =

Studio album by Kekal
- Released: 19 December 2012
- Recorded: Northern Isolation Station, Calgary, Alberta, Canada; Langit Sejuta Damai, Jakarta, Indonesia
- Genre: Experimental metal, electronic rock
- Length: 58:10
- Label: Whirlwind, Yes No Wave Music
- Producer: Jeff Arwadi

Kekal chronology
8 (2010)	Autonomy (2012)	Unsung Division EP (2013)

Autonomy is the ninth full-length studio album by Indonesian experimental metal band Kekal, first released on 19 December 2012 as CD version by German record label Whirlwind Records and then digitally by Indonesian record label Yes No Wave Music on June 29, 2013. This is a second Kekal album being recorded and released without official band members. The digital version of Autonomy can be downloaded for free from Archive.org.

There are two official music videos published for this album: "Futuride" and "Rare Earth Elements", released by the band on YouTube prior to the album's release date.

== Track listing ==
All tracks are written by Jeff Arwadi except where noted.

No.	Title	Writer(s)	Length
1.	"Rare Earth Elements"	Jeff Arwadi, Leo Setiawan	5:40
2.	"Pandora's Empty Box"		4:22
3.	"Go Ahead and Feel the Pain"		5:54
4.	"Disposable Man"		5:09
5.	"Swings of All Moods"		7:11
6.	"Indonesanity"		2:30
7.	"Futuride"		4:56
8.	"Playground"	Arwadi, Setiawan	5:08
9.	"iComa"		3:25
10.	"Space Between Spaces"		4:57
11.	"Learning to Love the Future"		8:58

== Personnel ==
- Jeff Arwadi - Vocals, lead guitar
- Levi Sianturi - Bass, vocals
- Leo Setiawan - Guitar

Additional credits:

- Jeff Arwadi – production, engineering and mixing
- Leo Setiawan – additional engineering
- Levi Sianturi – photography
