= 8 (Kekal album) =

Studio album by Kekal
- Released: 15 December 2010
- Recorded: Compiled 2009–2010, Northern Isolation Station, Calgary, Alberta, Canada
- Genre: Alternative rock, avant-garde metal, electronic, electronic rock, experimental, pop, post-rock, progressive rock
- Length: 56:26
- Label: Whirlwind
- Producer: Jeff Arwadi

Kekal chronology
Audible Minority (2008)	8 (2010)	Autonomy (2012)

Professional ratings
Review scores
Source	Rating
Cross Rhythms	5/10 stars
Metal Hammer Germany	4/7
Powermetal.de	8.0/10
Sonic Seducer	neutral

"Tabula Rasa"
The song "Tabula Rasa" was released as a music video and for streaming on 15 February 2010, and was included on Kekal's eighth studio album 8. At the time of the song's release, the album was still in development and was untitled.

8 is the eighth full-length studio album by Indonesian experimental metal band Kekal, announced on 23 June 2010, and made available for purchase on 23 January 2011. While the band has no officially active members, former members Jeff, Leo, and Levi all contributed to the album. The album was set to be released by Whirlwind Records during December 2010, on CD and as a digital download, and on 15 December 2010, the album was available for pre-order, which included an offer of free shipping within Europe up to December 24.

On 19 February 2010, Jeff announced that he had posted a music video on YouTube for a song titled "Tabula Rasa". At that time, the new album was still untitled. On 24 March 2011, it was announced that "Tabula Rasa" was included on a compilation/sampler album by the Sonic Seducer magazine. Metal Hammer Germany commented that the album was far from the early black metal days of the band, and gave the album a rating of 4 out of 7.

== Track listing ==
All tracks are written by Jeff Arwadi.

No.	Title	Length
1.	"Track One"	4:41
2.	"Gestalt Principles of Matter Perception"	6:06
3.	"A Linear Passage"	5:37
4.	"Tabula Rasa"	5:06
5.	"Private School of Thought"	4:37
6.	"The Regulars"	2:24
7.	"Departure Gate 8"	4:42
8.	"Heartache Memorial"	5:04
9.	"Let Us Blend"	5:22
10.	"Open World"	3:57
11.	"End Unit of the Universe"	8:47

== Personnel ==
- Jeff Arwadi – electric and acoustic guitars, vocals, drums, TR-808, theremin, analog synthesizer, vocoder, samples and field recordings
- Azhar Levi Sianturi – album artwork
- Leo Setiawan – additional guitar on "Departure Gate 8" and "Heartache Memorial"

=== Production credits ===
- Jeff Arwadi – assembly, programming, manipulation, arrangements, mixing, mastering
- A. Levi Sianturi (a.k.a. Harshgriev) – artwork and illustration
- Soundmind Graphics – digital layout
