= Paramaecium =

Australian death/doom metal band

- Origin: Melbourne, Victoria, Australia
- Genres: Christian metal, death-doom
- Years active: 1991–2006
- Labels: Witchhunt, Pleitegeier, Veridon, R.E.X. (U.S.)
- Spinoffs: inExordium
- Past members: Andrew Tompkins; Jason De Ron; Jayson Sherlock; Steve Palmer; Chris Burton; Mark Kelson; Ian Arkley; Mark Orr; Collin Mynard

Paramaecium (sometimes typeset as Paramæcium) were an Australian death-doom metal band formed in 1991, one of the few doom metal bands that focus on Christian lyrical themes and Christian concepts. According to Doom-metal.com, "what sets Paramaecium apart from other bands in the doom metal scene, is the fact that they are the only Christian death/doom band that made it to the top of the genre." There is use of symphonic instrumentation like flutes, cellos and violins on some albums.

== History ==
In 1993, Paramaecium released their debut album, Exhumed of the Earth. The band consisted of Andrew Tompkins on vocals and bass, Jason De Ron on guitar, and Jayson Sherlock on drums. The music was inspired by Cathedral, early My Dying Bride and Anathema. The band incorporated flute and violin sounds as well as a soprano alongside the usual musical offerings of death and doom metal.

Paramaecium added rhythm guitarist Chris Burton in 1995 and released their second album, Within the Ancient Forest, which was accompanied by a fantasy novel of the same name written by Tompkins. The album was more diverse and technical, and involved female vocalists, harpsichord, piano, flute and cello.

Sherlock left the band in 1996.

The third album, A Time to Mourn, was released in 1999 and marked the departure of all previous band members except Tompkins. The band no longer had a touring lineup, so guest musicians were used, including guitarist Ian Arkley (formerly of Seventh Angel, Ashen Mortality and My Silent Wake). After a five-year break, Paramaecium returned in 2004 with Echoes from the Ground. The album again featured Tompkins as the only original member, but held firmly to the band's doom and death metal roots while again incorporating soprano and violins.

In 2005, Tompkins started working again with guitarist De Ron on songs for a new album. Early in 2006, drummer Sherlock rejoined the band and they played a series of concerts in Melbourne and Sydney, Australia, and NordicFest in Oslo, Norway. The NordicFest appearance in November 2006 marked the official end of Paramaecium, but it was also the official launch of the band under its new name, InExordium. InExordium's name is derived from a Paramaecium song off of Within the Ancient Forest. After InExordium broke up, Sherlock and guitarist Sheldon D'Costa formed Revulsed.

== Album concepts ==
All of Paramaecium's albums have a concept that generally revolves around Christianity and Christian life. Exhumed of the Earth was based around the narrative of the New Testament, particularly the canonical gospels and the Book of Acts. Within the Ancient Forest is based on how Andrew Tompkins became a Christian, and A Time to Mourn is about a life in Christ, addressing the sorts of issues one might face as a modern Christian. Echoes from the Ground is about a young man's journey through the Holy Lands to find a justification for his faith.

== Members ==
Last known lineup

- Andrew Tompkins – bass, vocals, programming (1991–2006)
- Jason De Ron – guitar (1992–1996, 2006)
- Jayson Sherlock – drums (1993–1996, 2006)

Former

- Collin "Mosh" Mynard – guitar (1991–1992)
- Ian Arkley – guitar (1999)
- Mark Orr – drums (1999)
- Mark Kelson – guitar (1997–1999)
- Chris Burton – rhythm guitar (1995–1996)
- Steve Palmer – drums (1991–1993)

Timeline

== Discography ==
=== As Paramaecium ===
Studio albums

- Exhumed of the Earth (1993)
- Within the Ancient Forest (1996)
- A Time to Mourn (1999)
- Echoes from the Ground (2004)

Demos

- Silent Carnage (1991)

EPs

- Repentance (1996)

=== As InExordium ===
Studio albums

- InExordium (2008)
