= Embrace the Dead =

Studio album by Kekal
- Released: August 1999, THT Productions (Cassette); July 2000, Fleshwalker Records (CD); February 2001, THT Productions (CD)
- Recorded: February – July 1999, Yaski Studios, Jakarta, Indonesia
- Genre: Black metal, heavy metal, death metal, doom metal, gothic metal
- Length: 1:01:21
- Label: THT Productions; Fleshwalker Records
- Producer: Jeff/Kekal; Mastered by Habil Kurnia at Dunia Digital Mastering House

Kekal chronology
Beyond the Glimpse of Dreams (1998)	Embrace the Dead (1999)	The Painful Experience (2001)

2010 remaster
- On 15 August 2010, Embrace the Dead was re-issued as a limited-edition free download.

Professional ratings
Review scores
Source	Rating
Metal Storm	8/10
Powermetal.de	Favorable

Embrace the Dead is the second album by Indonesian extreme metal band Kekal. It reached sold-out status in 2004. On 15 August 2010, a new, remastered limited edition entitled Embrace the Dead 1999 was released as a free download, for up to a 1000 downloads. On 18 May 2012, Kekal made the re-mastered edition available for purchase on Bandcamp, citing exorbitant prices for second-hand copies of the original album on sites like Amazon.

== Recording ==
Embrace the Dead was, according to the band, the most difficult recording session for any of its albums. The band had almost no budget, and encountered problems with 16-track analog tape recorder that it was using. Because of the budget problems, the band could not book the studio ahead of time, and had to use left-over time from other band's recording sessions. This resulted in chaotic production quality, as the band had to reset the sound and mixing levels each time it recorded. Overall, it took almost seven months for the band to record the album. After recording, the band faced additional problems with releasing the album. The original cassette tape version was released in August 1999 for the Southeast Asian market only by Indonesian label THT Productions, but according to the band the original release date of the CD version was pushed forward to July 2000, when it was released on Fleshwalker Records, and then THT Productions released the CD version in February 2001.

== Track listing ==
Original release
No.	Title	Length
1.	"Longing for Truth"	6:11
2.	"Embrace the Dead"	5:24
3.	"The Fearless and the Dedicated"	7:52
4.	"Source of Existence" (Bonus track on THT Productions release)	6:39
5.	"Healing"	3:22
6.	"The Final Call"	5:16
7.	"From Within"	4:48
8.	"Scripture Before Struggle"	6:48
9.	"Millennium"	10:00
10.	"Given Words" (Bonus track on THT Productions release)	5:01
Total length:		1:01:21

2010 remaster
No.	Title	Length
1.	"Longing for Truth"	6:11
2.	"Embrace the Dead"	5:23
3.	"The Fearless and the Dedicated"	7:52
4.	"Healing"	3:23
5.	"The Final Call"	5:17
6.	"From Within"	4:48
7.	"Scripture Before Struggle"	6:47
8.	"Millennium"	10:00
9.	"Embrace the Dead (live)"	5:52
Total length:		55:30

== Release history ==
Release type	Date	Label	Format
Original release	August 1999	THT Productions	Cassette
Original release	July 2000	Fleshwalker Records	CD
Original release	February 2001	THT Productions	CD
Re-mastered re-release	15 August 2010	Self-released	Digital limited edition
Re-mastered re-release	18 May 2012	Self-released	Digital

== Personnel ==
- Jeff – guitars, vocals, keys, additional bass
- Azhar – bass, vocals, additional guitar
- Leo – guitars
- Habil Kurnia – keys, engineering and mixing
- Vera – female vocals
- The Black Machine – drums
- Prastowo Aklisugoro – engineering and mixing
- Denny Andreas – engineering and mixing
- Jeff – engineering and mixing
- Jeff/Soundmind Graphics – cover layout design
