= Beyond the Glimpse of Dreams =

Studio album by Kekal
- Released: January 1998, THT Productions (Cassette); October 1998, Sonic Wave (CD/Cassette)
- Recorded: April and December 1997, Yaski Studios, Jakarta, Indonesia
- Genres: Unblack metal, symphonic black metal
- Length: 50:11
- Labels: THT Productions/Sonic Wave, Candlelight Productions
- Producer: Jeff/Kekal

Kekal chronology
| Contra Spiritualia Nequitiae (1996) | Beyond the Glimpse of Dreams (1998) | Embrace the Dead (1999) |

Professional ratings
Review scores
| Source | Rating |
|---|---|
| Matt Morrow | 8/10 stars |
| The Phantom Tollbooth | 4.5/5 stars |

Beyond the Glimpse of Dreams is the debut album by Indonesian extreme metal band Kekal released in 1998. Vocalist Harry left the band after the album's release.

== Recording and release ==
Recorded on 16-track analog tape in April and December 1997 as two separate sessions, the album was originally released as a cassette by THT Productions in January 1998. Later in October 1998, Sonic Wave and Candlelight Productions re-released the album as CD and cassette with a different cover artwork. It went to sell 5000 copies total until being completely sold out in 2002. The album was re-mastered and re-issued in June, 2014.

== Style ==
The music on the album features extremely fast melodic black metal mixed with classic and thrash metal, and incorporates a range of vocal styles such as high pitched black metal shrieks, death growls, and female singing.

== Track listing ==
All lyrics are written by Kekal; all music is composed by Kekal.

| No. | Title | Length |
|---|---|---|
| 1. | "Rotting Youth" | 3:32 |
| 2. | "Armageddon" | 5:19 |
| 3. | "Spirits" | 6:32 |
| 4. | "Deceived Minds" | 4:11 |
| 5. | "The Conversion" | 5:49 |
| 6. | "Behind Those Images" | 3:17 |
| 7. | "Reality" | 5:19 |
| 8. | "Escaping Eternal Suffering" | 5:18 |
| 9. | "A Day the Hatred Dies" | 6:15 |
| 10. | "My Eternal Lover" | 6:11 |

== Personnel ==
- Harry – vocals
- Leo – guitar, vocal narration
- Jeff – guitar, vocals
- Azhar – bass, vocals
- Julie, Hana & Vera – female vocals
- The Black Machine – drums
- Jeff, Habil & Leo – keyboards
- Habil Kurnia & Denny Andreas – engineering & mixing
