= The Painful Experience =

Studio album by Kekal
- Released: October 2001
- Recorded: Vision Studio, Jakarta, Indonesia; The Dream Dome, Bandung, Indonesia
- Genre: Black metal, heavy metal, power metal, progressive metal, thrash metal, symphonic black metal
- Length: 49:52
- Label: Fear Dark, THT, Clenchedfist, HROM/HIRAX
- Producer: Jeff/Kekal

Kekal chronology
Embrace the Dead (1999)	The Painful Experience (2001)	Chaos & Warfare (2002)

The Painful Experience is the third full-length studio album by Indonesian extreme metal band Kekal. It marks the transition of Kekal from straightforward melodic black metal to a more distinct progressive metal style, while still retaining the intensity and speed. The title refers to the recording sessions for Embrace the Dead. Guitarist Leo Setiawan left the band before the recording sessions began and moved to Melbourne, Australia, but he was still listed on the album credits as a guitarist due to his contribution to the album's songwriting and general concept. The album was released by four independent labels: Fear Dark in the Netherlands for the European market, Clenchedfist Records in the United States for the North American market, Indonesian label THT Productions for the Southeast Asian market, and HROM/HIRAX for Eastern European market.

== Reception ==
Professional ratings
Review scores
Source	Rating
Arising Realm Magazine	6.0/10
Lords of Metal	80/100
Matt Morrow	8.5/10 stars
Metal Storm	6/10
Powermetal.de	Very favorable

Kekal experimented greatly on The Painful Experience, and received mixed to positive reviews. The album was praised by critics for its numerous experiments and emotional quality, but was criticized for Jeff's falsetto screaming on some of the songs, which drew comparisons to King Diamond. Austrian magazine Arising Realm Magazine rated the album 6.0 out of 10, stating that the band had potential but that the album was vague. Staff member Promonex of Metal Storm also rated the album 6/10, while Stefan Lang from Powermetal.de viewed the album very favorably. Peter Doorakers of Lords of Metal rated the album 80 out of 100, concluding that "All in all a fine album. The more adventurous black metalfans should give it a try." In 2010, Christian contemporary hard-music music magazine HM Magazine ranked it number 59 on their Top 100 Christian metal albums of all-time list with Lloyd Harp stating about the album: "This Indonesian band's early work was primitive black metal. The Painful Experience took the harshness of black metal, but infused it with lots of melodies and some progressive sensibilities. It hinted at the ground their later works would traverse, but The Painful Experience is perhaps the most successful of their fusion of progressive metal and extreme black metal."

== Style ==
The diverse style of the album includes elements of black, thrash, power, classic, and symphonic black metal. In a recent interview with the band's Facebook staff, Jeff stated that he had forgotten how much energy and intensity he and the other band members put into recording the album. He also admitted that album contains a fair amount of Iron Maiden influence, and that he had been listening to a lot of Iron Maiden material at the time of recording.

=== Lyrical themes ===
For this release, the band expanded its lyrical approach to tackle the current socio-political scene in Indonesia. The opening track "The Monsters Within" is based on a true story of an impoverished man who is reduced to stealing but is caught and beaten by a mob. The song "Mean Attraction" is about terrorism and is based on the Indonesian Christmas Eve church bombings of 2000. The title track is about the painfulness of life and how Christians have to take up their cross.

== Track listing ==
All tracks are written by Jeff Arwadi.

No.	Title	Length
1.	"The Monsters Within"	4:41
2.	"Crave for Solid Ground"	5:10
3.	"Mean Attraction"	4:17
4.	"There's No Other Way to Go"	4:18
5.	"Behind Closed Doors"	5:49
6.	"Like After the Storm"	5:42
7.	"Given Words"	4:44
8.	"Militia Christi"	4:03
9.	"The Painful Experience"	7:58
10.	"Via Dolorosa"	4:10

Bonus tracks
No.	Title	Length
11.	"Voice from Heaven" (Clenchedfist Records)	5:14
12.	"Like There's No Other Way to Remix" (Fear Dark Records)	5:17

== Personnel ==
Line-up:

- Jeff Arwadi – guitars, vocals, synth orchestrations, noises and samples, additional bass
- Azhar Levi Sianturi – bass, vocals, additional guitar
- Leo Setiawan – guitars (credited, but did not perform)
- FXAJ – additional guitars, noises and samples, additional arrangements
- Doctor D – additional vocals, noises and samples, additional arrangements
- Sang Hitam – drum machine

Additional Credits:

- Aris Darisman – severed face sculpture
- Jeff Arwadi – engineering and mixing
- Jeff/Soundmind Graphics – cover layout design
