= Live Planetarium =

Live album by Mortification
- Released: 1993
- Recorded: 1 October 1993 at the Blackstump Festival in Appin, New South Wales, Australia
- Genre: Christian metal; thrash metal; death metal
- Length: 58:41
- Label: Intense Records
- Producer: Doug Saunders

Mortification live chronology
| Live Planetarium (1993) | Live Without Fear (1996) |

Live Planetarium is the first live album and fifth release of Australian Christian death metal band Mortification, released in 1993. It contains live versions of material from the band's three previously released studio albums, Mortification (1991), Scrolls of the Megilloth (1992), and Post Momentary Affliction (1993), as well as two new songs, "Symbiosis" and "Time Crusaders", and a cover of "Black Snake" by American Christian metal band Bloodgood. A video version of Live Planetarium was released on VHS in 1994 and later on DVD in 2006. A segment on Mortification's history, from the video of Live Planetarium, was included on the Tourniquet/Mortification Collector's Edition CD Single in 1994; the disc also contained songs from Mortification's Blood World album and American Christian metal band Tourniquet's Vanishing Lessons album. A studio recording of "Symbiosis" was included on Blood World. Soundmass released a reissue of Live Planetarium in 2019 on vinyl with new cover art and on CD in 2020 with the studio version of "Time Crusaders" as a bonus track; the track "Black Snake" was removed from the reissues.

== Track listing ==
All tracks are written by Mortification except "Black Snake" by Bloodgood

| No. | Title | Lyrics | Music | Original album | Length |
|---|---|---|---|---|---|
| 1. | "Grind Planetarium" | Steve Rowe | Rowe | Post Momentary Affliction (1993) | 5:16 |
| 2. | "Distarnish Priest" | Rowe | Rowe | Post Momentary Affliction (1993) | 7:50 |
| 3. | "Brutal Warfare" | Rowe | Jayson Sherlock; Rowe | Mortification (1991) | 4:10 |
| 4. | "Destroyer Beholds" | Rowe | Rowe | Mortification (1991) | 3:56 |
| 5. | "Inflamed" | Michael Carlisle | Carlisle | Scrolls of the Megilloth (1992) | 3:32 |
| 6. | "Scrolls of the Megilloth" (3:37 on the 2020 reissue) | Rowe | Rowe | Scrolls of the Megilloth (1992) | 3:29 |
| 7. | "Symbiosis" (5:43 on the 2020 reissue) | Carlisle | Carlisle | – | 6:03 |
| 8. | "Time Crusaders" (5:41 on the 2020 reissue) | Rowe | Rowe | – | 5:55 |
| 9. | "Black Snake^{[a]}" (Bloodgood cover) | Michael Bloodgood | Michael Bloodgood | Bloodgood (1986) | 2:36 |
| 10. | "From the Valley of Shadows" | Carlisle | Carlisle | Post Momentary Affliction (1993) | 8:12 |
| 11. | "Human Condition" | Rowe | Rowe | Post Momentary Affliction (1993) | 5:45 |
| 12. | "The Majestic Infiltration of Order" | Rowe | Rowe | Mortification (1991) | 1:10 |
| 13. | "This Momentary Affliction" | Carlisle | Carlisle | Post Momentary Affliction (1993) | 0:47 |
| Total length: | | | | | 58:41 |

^{a} Song not included on the 2019 or 2020 reissues.

2020 CD reissue bonus track
| No. | Title | Length |
|---|---|---|
| 13. | "Time Crusaders" (studio version) | 4:41 |
| Total length: | | 59:46 |

== Personnel ==
Mortification

- Steve Rowe – vocals, bass guitar
- Michael Carlisle – guitar
- Jayson Sherlock – drums

Production

- Doug Saunders – producer, studio production, location recording, mix engineer
- Shaun Kerrigan – assistant engineer, location recording
- Doug Doyle – mastering at Digital Brothers in Costa Mesa, California
- Neil Johnson – video production, video editing, video direction, cameraman

Additional personnel

- Troy Dunmire – cover illustration
- Chris Dean – cover design
- Kristy Hiller – design, layout (original version)
- Matthew Duffy – A&R direction
- Thom Roy – art direction
- Keith Bannister – photography, roadie
- Surfie – live photographer
- Sean Moss, Trevor Smith – cameramen
- Rehearsals at Jam Tin Studios in Chetelham, Melbourne, Australia
- Mixed at Toybox Studios in Northcote, Melbourne, Australia, 11 October 1993 – 20 October 1993
- Amber Waters – hand colouring (2019 and 2020 versions)
- Scott Waters (Ultimatum) – design, layout (2019 and 2020 versions)
