= Mortification =

Mortification may refer to:

- Mortification (theology), theological doctrine
- Mortification of the flesh, religious practice of corporal mortification
- Mortification in Roman Catholic teaching, Roman Catholic doctrine of mortification
- Extreme embarrassment
- Mortification (band), a Christian extreme metal band
  - Mortification (album)
