= Hellig Usvart =

Christian Unblack Metal album

Studio album by Horde
- Released: 1994
- Recorded: 11–15 July 1994
- Genre: Unblack metal
- Length: 40:29
- Labels: Nuclear Blast Records; Rowe Productions; Metal Mind Productions; Soundmass
- Producers: Jayson Sherlock (credited as Anonymous), Markus Staiger

Horde chronology
Hellig Usvart (1994)	The Day of Total Armageddon Holocaust – Alive in Oslo (2007)

Hellig Usvart is the debut studio album by Australian unblack metal band Horde, released on Nuclear Blast Records in 1994. Upon its release, the album created a controversy among many black metal fans; death threats were sent to Nuclear Blast demanding the label to drop the album from its catalogue because the album contains Christian, anti-satanic lyrics, counteracting the usual black metal thematics at the time. As a result of the strong lyrical contradiction, the album was thought to be a parody of the Norwegian black metal movement by magazines such as Morgenbladet in 1995.

The sole member of the band, Jayson Sherlock (who used the pseudonym Anonymous), later stated in interviews that the album was intended to bring "some hope, some light to the bleak black metal subculture." Rowe Productions, Metal Mind Productions, and Soundmass have since released reissues of the album. Hellig Usvart has achieved a respected landmark status in the Christian metal movement, and it is regarded as the first and most groundbreaking Christian black metal album.

== Recording history ==
In 1993, drummer Jayson Sherlock parted ways with the Christian death metal band Mortification, having been in the band since 1990, and joined the death-doom metal band Paramaecium. During this time, Sherlock was charmed by Northern European black metal music, but did not like the malicious lyrical approach of the movement. He decided to record similar music but with a Christian message, with the intent to bring hope to the bleak black metal subculture. Sherlock ended up forming a solo project, as he could play guitar, bass, and keyboards aside with drums, his main musical instrument. In 1994, Sherlock's solo project, Beheadoth, recorded the song "Mine Heart Doth Beseech Thee (O Master)" for the Godspeed: Australian Metal Compilation album by Rowe Productions, going under the pseudonym Unpaganuth Necronomoccultociduth. He later changed the name of the solo project from Beheadoth to Horde and changed his pseudonym to Anonymous. Sherlock made use of his former band Mortification's relationship with Nuclear Blast Records and talked to the label owner, Markus Staiger, about releasing Horde's album. Staiger became interested in the project and decided to release it.

Hellig Usvart was recorded in four days, beginning on 11 July and ending on 15 July 1994; Sherlock mixed, played, and produced everything himself. A person under the pseudonym "Unblack Mark" handled the studio and recording techniques. As a graphic artist himself, Sherlock created the album's packaging and cover picture. Sherlock marked himself under the pseudonym "Anonymous" in the album's booklet since neither he nor the record company were supposed to reveal his identity. The album's title, Hellig Usvart, is Norwegian for "Holy Unblack". Sherlock said in an interview about the album name: "I read on the back of an early Dark Throne album, 'Dark Throne play Unholy Black Metal'. Horde was always going to be lyrically the opposite of this, hence: 'Holy Unblack Metal'. I guess this is how the 'unblack' name or title came about. The music sounded like BM, but because of the lyrics and the spirit behind it, it is not BM."

== Overview ==
Musically, Hellig Usvart features a musical output similar to the early 1990s Norwegian primitive, lo-fi, old school black metal music. The first three songs feature a more obscure output, while songs such as "Thine Hour Hast Come" and "Invert the Inverted Cross" are more groove-based, and "Weak, Feeble, Dying Antichrist" is more doom metal-based. The album is said to contain outstanding drumming, for Sherlock was primarily a drummer. Lyrically, Hellig Usvart features direct and indirect praise for God, and is known for its anti-satanic approach, as implied by the song titles.

Upon its original release in 1994 on Nuclear Blast, 4,000 copies of the album were printed. In 1999, Rowe Productions purchased the remaining copies and distributed them worldwide. The album has since been re-released on this label with an additional track entitled, "My Heart Doth Beseech Thee (O Master)". In October 2004, the Australian label Soundmass reissued Hellig Usvart as a 10-year anniversary edition. In May 2008, the Polish label Metal Mind Productions remastered the album in a digipak format and included three live bonus tracks. The Metal Mind release was limited to 2,000 copies. Soundmass reissued Hellig Usvart on vinyl in 2018 and later in 2019 on CD for the album's twenty-fifth anniversary.

== Songs ==
Hellig Usvart has references to the Bible in various songs on the album. The opening track, "A Church Bell Tolls Amidst the Frozen Nordic Winds," is an instrumental. "Blasphemous Abomination of the Satanic Pentagram" is the shortest track, being less than one minute in length, and is lyrically about both the Lord's displeasure for the symbol and the act of destroying it. "Behold, the Rising of the Scarlet Moon" references Acts 2:20 and Revelation 14:10 in the lyrics. "Thine Hour Hast Come" is about the fall of Lucifer and directly references the line "Lucifer, son of the morning" from Isaiah 14:12. "Release and Clothe the Virgin Sacrifice" describes an attempted sacrifice of a female virgin by an evil group, ending with the woman getting away from the location as a result of holy spiritual beings intervening for her. "Drink from the Chalice of Blood" directly references Jesus' "precious blood" from 1 Peter 1:19; it also references the crucifixion of Jesus Christ at Calvary and describes the act of orally ingesting his blood as part of the Eucharist. "Silence the Blasphemous Chanting" is about an individual who sees a group attempt to call forth Satan and successfully puts a stop to it, with the lyrics drawing parallels to Ephesians 4:29. "Invert the Inverted Cross" is about an inverted cross being used as a symbol for evil and directly references the line "the keys of death and Hades" from Revelation 1:18. "An Abandoned Grave Bathes Softly in the Falling Moonlight" describes a graveyard and an individual in it who died after the end-times, drawing parallels to 1 Corinthians 15:52. "Crush the Bloodied Horns of the Goat" is about violently excoriating a goat's cranium, which is meant to signify the Devil's head, and pulverizing it. "Weak, Feeble, Dying Antichrist" describes the rejection and eventual death of the Antichrist. "The Day of Total Armageddon Holocaust" is about the events that occur in Revelation 6:12-17. "Mine Heart Doth Beseech Thee (O Master)," a bonus track on several later releases of Hellig Usvart, describes a person under the threat of Satan and demons from Hell, who calls upon the power of God both for self-protection and to defeat the unholy forces; the song's lyrics contain a reference to Deuteronomy 31:6.

== Controversy ==
Upon the initial release of Hellig Usvart in 1994, a publicity campaign was launched throughout the black metal community, revolving around Sherlock being credited as "Anonymous". Unsuccessful death threats were given to Markus Staiger at Nuclear Blast to reveal the identity of the anonymous musician who created the album, although the identity of the musician was later revealed as Jayson Sherlock. Horde as an entity also received death threats for being a Christian band playing black metal. In an interview with Son of Man Records' Erasmus, Sherlock says: "I only ever heard about them [death threats] second hand. I never personally received any death threats at all, not one. I kept hearing but that was all." Due to the intense, furious anti-satanic themes of "horn crushing" and "goat violence," the album was widely thought to be a parody of the black metal scene. As evidence of that, on 6 June 1995, the Norwegian newspaper Morgenbladet wrote an article about the phenomenon of Horde, writing: "Horde's album is an abrupt satire of the Norwegian black metal movement." The same article says of Hellig Usvart that "all the obligatory Spinal Tap references are here: [the liner notes of the album says that] Anonymous plays 'Total Apocalyptic Lead Guitar' and 'Cataclysmic Bass Rumblings'. Obviously 'amplified to eleven'." In an interview, Sherlock cleared up the parody controversy:

Within the black metal scene, watching all the way across the world, all I could see was a bleak, dark, hopeless, lifeless and negative void. All I wanted to do was to shine a light into that darkness. Give an alternative that was comparable in sound to the scene I was trying to infiltrate, to provide some hope, some light. That was all. No mockery, no parody, no jokes. I would never mock any style of music, nor would I mock the musicians themselves. I have great respect for them. The music of Immortal, Emperor, Dimmu Borgir, Satyricon, etc. is incredible, masterful. One can still show respect, while disagreeing with certain lyrical content. I wanted to remain unknown for as long as I could, to sustain the mystery. I could not resist the similarity of Anonymous to Euronymous, so, regardless of the existence of Euronymous, I was still going to be known as Anonymous. Just a coincidence that both the words were so similar. Also the reference to 'Unblack Mark' was a play on 'Black Mark Records' which is Bathory's label. This was the only light hearted element of the entire project.

— Jayson Sherlock (Anonymous) on Horde's assumed parody controversy in a 2006 interview with Son of Man Records.

== Impact and legacy ==
Professional ratings
Review scores
Source	Rating
Chronicles of Chaos	6/10
Rock Hard	8/10 stars
Sea of Tranquility	4/5 stars
The Whipping Post	10/10

Hellig Usvart was a seminal, highly influential album for the Christian black metal movement. The album spawned some imitators, especially in South America, with unblack metal groups such as Poems of Shadows taking apparent influences from Horde's style on their debut album Nocturnal Blasphemous Chanting. The raging lyrics of anti-satanism would dominate the unblack scene for years. Concerned about that, Erasmus of Son of Man Records asked Sherlock in a 2006 interview: "Do you feel that unblack metal will be able to efficiently continue its response to black metal if it does not grow beyond 'horn crushing'?" Sherlock responded, "No I do not. The lyrics on 'Hellig Usvart' were written 12 years ago. I'm sure that if another Horde album was written today, the themes would be quite different and much more mature, to counteract the poetic and intelligent (albeit misguided) lyrics of modern BM."

After the release, magazines such as HM gave Hellig Usvart positive reviews, and later critics such as Matt Morrow of The Whipping Post gave the album a 10/10 score, writing "...this album was made more than anything, to make a point. It made that point loud and clear, and it also kicked the door wide open and paved the way for many Christian black metal bands in the future to bring the light of Christ to an extremely dark music scene." Rock Hard said about the album, "It takes courage to release such a disc". In 2010, HM Magazine listed Hellig Usvart #63 on its Top 100 Christian Rock Albums of All Time list stating that it "kicked off a Christocentric infiltration of black metal culture" and it "holds up as a righteously furious assault".

Conversely, Quentin Kalis of Chronicles of Chaos, in a retrospective 2008 review, felt that the music on the album was ordinary and not that good. They noted that the album was recorded in a week, and this was evident in the music. They expressed disappointment at the result of what otherwise had a lot of potential and, as a parody was "far better than the juvenile profanities of Blackthrone." They rated the album 6 out of 10.

== Track listing ==
All songs written and composed by Anonymous (Jayson Sherlock).

No.	Title	Length
1.	"A Church Bell Tolls Amidst the Frozen Nordic Winds^{[a]}" (Instrumental)	1:02
2.	"Blasphemous Abomination of the Satanic Pentagram^{[a]}"	0:46
3.	"Behold, the Rising of the Scarlet Moon^{[a]}"	3:21
4.	"Thine Hour Hast Come^{[a]}"	4:05
5.	"Release and Clothe the Virgin Sacrifice^{[a]}"	5:37
6.	"Drink From the Chalice of Blood^{1}"	3:58
7.	"Silence the Blasphemous Chanting^{[a]}^{2}"	5:37
8.	"Invert the Inverted Cross^{[a]}"	3:09
9.	"An Abandoned Grave Bathes Softly in the Falling Moonlight^{[a]}"	5:09
10.	"Crush the Bloodied Horns of the Goat^{[a]}"	2:24
11.	"Weak, Feeble, Dying Antichrist^{3}"	3:31
12.	"The Day of Total Armageddon Holocaust^{[a]}^{4}"	1:42
Total length:		40:29

^{a} 2006 live recording appears on The Day of Total Armageddon Holocaust – Alive in Oslo (2007)

10th Anniversary Edition (2004)/25th Anniversary Edition (2019) bonus track
No.	Title	Writer(s)	Length
13.	"Mine Heart Doth Beseech Thee (O Master)"	Unpaganuth Necronomoccultociduth (Jayson Sherlock)	2:55
Total length:			43:24

2008 remaster bonus tracks
No.	Title	Length
13.	"Behold, the Rising of the Scarlet Moon" (Live 2006)	3:29
14.	"Thine Hour Hast Come" (Live 2006)	4:09
15.	"The Day of Total Armageddon Holocaust" (Live 2006)	3:55
Total length:		52:02

== Personnel ==
Horde

- Anonymous (aka Jayson Sherlock) – vocals, lead, rhythm and acoustic guitars, bass guitar, keyboards, drums

Production

- Markus Staiger – executive producer
- Anonymous – arrangement, layout, logo, mixing, photography, production
- Rusty Scott – layout (original Rowe Productions release)
- Unblack Mark – engineer, recording

== Notes ==
^{1.} Mistitled "Drink From the Chalice of Love" on some digital releases.

^{2.} Mistitled "Sinlence the Blasphemous Chanting" on the original Rowe Productions CD release.

^{3.} Alternatively titled "Weak, Feeble and Dying Anti-Christ" on certain pressings.

^{4.} Track name is unlisted on the back of the original Rowe Productions pressing, but is included on the disc.
