= Alive in Oslo =

Live album by Horde
- Released: April 2007
- Recorded: 3 November 2006
- Venue: Nordic Festival, Oslo, Norway
- Genre: Unblack metal
- Length: 36:03
- Label: Veridon Music
- Producer: Jayson Sherlock

Horde chronology
Hellig Usvart (1994)	Alive in Oslo (2007)

Alive in Oslo (fully titled The Day of Total Armageddon Holocaust – Alive in Oslo) is a live album by Australian unblack metal band Horde, released by Veridon Music in April 2007. The album features a live concert by the band, recorded at Nordic Fest in Oslo, Norway on 3 November 2006, during which nearly all the band's material was performed except for the tracks "Drink From the Chalice of Blood," "Weak, Feeble, Dying Antichrist," and "Mine Heart Doth Beseech Thee (O Master)." It also features a bonus DVD of the same name containing video footage of the show. Three songs from the live album later appeared as bonus tracks on the remastered version of Horde's only studio album, Hellig Usvart (1994), released by Metal Mind Productions in May 2008.

Simon Rosén, the frontman for the Swedish metal band Crimson Moonlight, and Bengt Olsson, Håvar Wormdahl and Karl Fredrik Lind from the Norwegian extreme metal band Drottnar, perform on the album in addition to Horde's founder Jayson Sherlock.

== Track listing ==
All songs written by Anonymous (Jayson Sherlock).

No.	Title	Length
1.	"A Church Bell Tolls Amidst the Frozen Nordic Winds (live)" (Instrumental)	1:02
2.	"Blasphemous Abomination of the Satanic Pentagram (live)"	0:47
3.	"Behold, the Rising of the Scarlet Moon (live)^{[a]}"	3:28
4.	"Thine Hour Hast Come (live)^{[a]}"	4:09
5.	"Release and Clothe the Virgin Sacrifice (live)"	5:19
6.	"Silence the Blasphemous Chanting (live)"	5:25
7.	"Invert the Inverted Cross (live)"	3:52
8.	"An Abandoned Grave Bathes Softly in the Falling Moonlight (live)"	5:09
9.	"Crush the Bloodied Horns of the Goat (live)"	2:23
10.	"The Day of Total Armageddon Holocaust (live)^{[a]}"	4:29
Total length:		36:03

^{a} live recording appears on the 2008 remaster of Hellig Usvart

== Personnel ==
- Anonymous (a.k.a. Jayson Sherlock) – vocals, drums
- Bengt "Bøddel" Olsson (of Drottnar) – lead guitar, rhythm guitar
- Håvar "Gestalt" Wormdahl (of Drottnar) – bass guitar
- Karl Fredrik "Kvest" Lind (of Drottnar) – rhythm guitar
- Simon "Pilgrim Bestiarius XII" Rosén (of Crimson Moonlight) – guest vocals on "Invert the Inverted Cross"

Production

- Jayson Sherlock – design, layout, logo
- Thomas Thunder – mixing
- Brad K – sound recording
