= Lament (band) =

Mexican death metal/power metal band

- Also known as: Beheaded
- Origin: Mexico City, Mexico
- Genres: Christian metal, death metal; power metal; brutal death metal; grindcore; doom metal; extreme metal
- Years active: 1993–present
- Labels: Rowe; Roxx; Little Rose; Bombworks; Lament; Vision of God
- Members: Abel Gómez; Erick Conde; Jorge Lopez; Juan Rangel
- Past members: Apolos León; Benjamin Rojas; Edmundo Mondragon; Jesus Torres; Marco Pérez; Iram Gómez
- Website: Lament on Facebook

Lament is a Mexican death metal/power metal band. that originated in Mexico City in 1993.

== Background ==
Lament formed in 1993 under the name Beheaded. The original genre was along the lines of grindcore and brutal death metal. In 1996, the band switched their name to Lament after the death of Drummer Arturo Guzman. Soon after changing names, the band went to a music festival, where the band met Steve Rowe of Mortification. In 1997, the band recorded their debut album Tears of a Leper. The artwork was apparently controversial, so the band had to use an alternative cover. In 1998, the band was dropped by Rowe Productions and lost their original vocalist Marcos Pérez. The band released their third album, Breathless in 2001 through Kingdom. Eight years later, the band released Renaissance, through Lament Records, label that the band formed as a way to independently release their material. Four years later, the band released Left Behind in 2013. In 2017, it was announced that Lament, alongside Dehumanize, had signed to Vision of God Records and were reissuing Tears of a Leper and were working on new material.

Lament Records has signed additional bands and they have distribution through Vision of God Records in the United States.

== Members ==
Current

- Abel Gómez – drums, (1996–2015), guitars, (1993–1996, 2015–present), vocals (1998–2013, 2013–present)
- Erick Conde – guitars (1993–2020, 2024–present)
- Jorge Lopez – bass (2014–present)
- Job Levi Gómez – drums (2019–present)

Former

- Marcos Pérez – vocals (1993–1998)
- Fidel Sanchez – vocals (2013)
- Apolos León – guitars (1996–2001)
- Benjamin Rojas – guitars (1996–2001)
- Edmundo Mondragon – guitars (2001–2007)
- Benjamin Gomez – guitars (2007–2012)
- Elias Santillan – guitars (2012–2015)
- Jesus Torres
- Iram Gómez – bass (1994–2013)
- Carlos Daniel Renteria – bass (2013–2014)
- Arturo Guzman – drums (1993–1996) (died 1996)
- Miguel Martinez – drums (2013–2015)
- Juan Rangel – drums (2015–2018)
- Dylan Hernandez – drums (2018–2019)

== Discography ==
=== As Beheaded ===
Demos

- El Valle de la Decisión (1994)

=== As Lament ===
Studio albums

- Tears of a Leper (1997)
- Through the Reflection (1999)
- Breathless (2001)
- Renaissance (2009)
- The Ancient Battle of the Saints (2018)
- Burn Satan Burn (2021)
- Shot Down But Not Destroyed (2024)

EPs

- Left Behind (2013)

Compilations

- Best of Lament: 14 Years Rocking the World (2007)
