= EnVision EvAngelene =

Studio album by Mortification
- Released: 23 April 1996
- Recorded: November 1995
- Studio: St. Andrews Studio in Melbourne, Australia
- Genres: Christian metal; heavy metal; thrash metal
- Length: 50:12 (original); 66:23 (2008 reissue); 68:59 (2021 reissue)
- Labels: Nuclear Blast; Rowe Productions; Diamante; Metal Mind Productions; Soundmass
- Producers: Mark McCormack; Steve Rowe

Mortification chronology
| The Best of Five Years (1996) | EnVision EvAngelene (1996) | Noah Sat Down and Listened to the Mortification Live EP While Having a Coffee (1996) |

Professional ratings
Review scores
| Source | Rating |
|---|---|
| Cross Rhythms | 5/10 stars |

EnVision EvAngelene is the sixth studio album by the Australian Christian metal band Mortification, released on 23 April 1996. Musically, this album continued the band's shift away from death metal, instead combining power metal, grindcore, and punk.

Two reissues of EnVision EvAngelene have been released; in 2008 on Metal Mind Productions with four bonus tracks and in 2021 on Soundmass with five bonus tracks and a second disc containing the Live Without Fear album.

== Songs ==
The most notable song on the album is the epic opening title track which clocks in at over 18 minutes. The lyrics in the song tell of the crucifixion of Jesus Christ from the perspective of the Angels. Music videos were shot for both the title song and "Northern Storm" and released on a video compilation titled EnVidion.

== Reception ==
The music on this album received some appreciation, which would lead to the band continuing in a power metal direction. However, after this album, as the band's style began changing even more, the critics' interest in Mortification began fading. Despite that, the band's albums would keep selling well, and they would remain their reputive status as "some kind of super stars in the Christian metal scene."

== Track listing ==
1. "EnVision EvAngelene" (in 8 parts) – 18:52

i. Musical Prelude 1 – Emmaculate Conception
ii. Musical Prelude 2 – The Imminent Messiah
iii. Persecuted Quest
iv. The Words at the Supper
v. Angelic Sufferance
vi. Angelic Resurgence
vii. Frustrated Vision
viii. Please Tarry

2. "Northern Storm" – 3:43
3. "Peace in the Galaxy" – 4:51
4. "Jehovah Nissi" – 6:05
5. "Buried into Obscurity" – 3:25
6. "Chapel of Hope" – 4:03
7. "Noah Was a Knower" – 3:39
8. "Crusade for the King" – 5:33

2008 reissue bonus tracks

9. "Envision a Beginning (Live)"^{[a]} – 2:10
10. "Buried into Obscurity (Live)"^{[b]} – 3:18
11. "Chapel of Hope (Live)"^{[b]} – 4:37
12. "Peace in the Galaxy (Live)"^{[b]} – 6:04

^{a} Song from Noah Sat Down and Listened to the Mortification Live E.P. While Having a Coffee (1996)
^{b} Songs from 10 Years Live Not Dead (2000)

"Live 1996" 2021 reissue bonus tracks (disc one)

9. "Envision a Beginning (Live 1996)" – 2:09
10. "Buried into Obscurity (Live 1996)" – 3:16
11. "Northern Storm (Live 1996)" – 3:50
12. "Peace in the Galaxy (Live 1996)" – 5:06
13. "Chapel of Hope (Live 1996)" – 4:21

"Live Without Fear" 2021 reissue bonus tracks (disc two)

1. "Mephibosheth (Live 1996)" – 3:49
2. "Northern Storm (Live 1996)" – 3:43
3. "Primitive Rhythm Machine (Live 1996)" – 4:52
4. "New Beginnings (Live 1996)" – 3:00
5. "Grind Planetarium (Live 1996)" – 4:58
6. "Blood World (Live 1996)" – 4:16
7. "Steve Talks (Live 1996)" – 1:59
8. "The Majestic Infiltration of Order (Live 1996)" – 1:10
9. "J.G.S.H. (Jesus Grind Satan's Head) (Live 1996)" – 0:27
10. "Killing Evil (Live 1996)" – 0:38

== Personnel ==
Mortification

- Steve Rowe – lead vocals, bass guitar
- Lincoln Bowen – guitar, backing vocals
- Keith Bannister – drums, backing vocals

Additional musicians

- Mark McCormack – keyboards
- Tim Perry – comet
- Sally Pert – harp
- Dougie, Joyce Madil, Sally Peart, Tim Perry, Johny Stoj, Rod Strong – backing vocals

Production

- Steve Rowe – producer, executive production
- Mark McCormack – producer

Additional personnel

- Steve Rowe – cover concept
- Markus Staiger – photography
- Troy Dunmire – cover art
- Scott Waters (Ultimatum) – design, layout (2021 version)
- Tobias Jäpel – remastering (2021 version)
- Phil Lake – live recording (Live Without Fear)
