= Horde (band) =

Australian unblack metal group

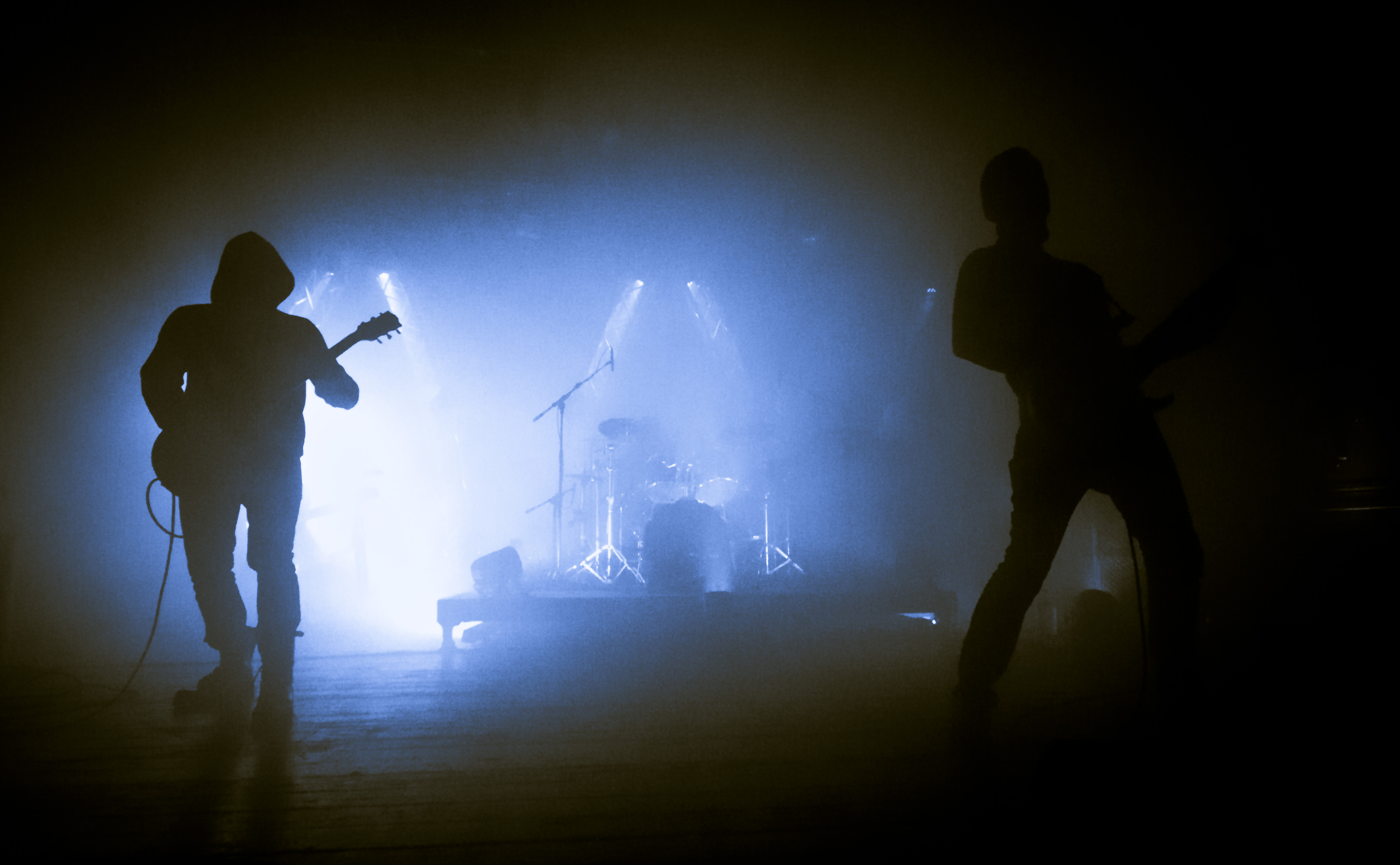
- Horde at Elements of Rock 2013

Background information
- Also known as: Beheadoth
- Origin: Australia
- Genre: Unblack metal
- Years active: 1994–present
- Labels: Nuclear Blast, Rowe, Veridon, Metal Mind, Soundmass
- Members: Jayson Sherlock

Horde (originally called Beheadoth) is an unblack metal solo project of Australian musician Jayson Sherlock, formerly of Mortification and Paramaecium. In 1994, the only studio album, Hellig Usvart, was released on Nuclear Blast Records. With a session line-up, Horde played live in 2006 in Norway and in 2010 in Finland and Germany.

Hellig Usvart proved to be a seminal release for the unblack metal (also known as Christian black metal) movement, and the album was highly controversial in the secular black metal scene at the time it was released.

== History ==
Sherlock recorded one studio album, Hellig Usvart ("Holy Unblack"), under the pseudonym "Anonymous" (a possible play on "Euronymous", Mayhem guitarist), releasing it on Nuclear Blast in 1994, followed by a later re-release by Rowe Productions. The album title is Norwegian, a fact which led many to believe, while Sherlock was still anonymous, that Horde originated from Norway, a fact backed up by the poor production quality on the album, considered to be a trademark of Norwegian black metal.

Upon the initial release of Hellig Usvart, a publicity campaign was launched throughout the black metal community, revolving around Sherlock being credited as "Anonymous". Unsuccessful death threats were given to Markus Staiger at Nuclear Blast, who founded the record label, to reveal the identity of the anonymous musician who had created the album, although the identity of the musician was later revealed as Jayson Sherlock. Horde as an entity also received death threats for being a Christian band playing black metal. Upon its original release in 1994, 4,000 copies of the album were printed. In 1999, Rowe Productions purchased the remaining copies and distributed them worldwide. Hellig Usvart was re-released for the album's tenth anniversary in 2004 on Rowe Productions and Soundmass with an additional track entitled "Mine Heart Doth Beseech Thee (O Master)", which was originally included on Godspeed: Australian Metal Compilation in 1994 by Rowe Productions and also included on later Soundmass reissues of Hellig Usvart. The album is difficult to come by and sought after by many. In April 2007, a live album, The Day of Total Armageddon Holocaust – Alive in Oslo, was released on Veridon Music and contains the 2006 performance of Horde at Nordic Fest; a video album of the concert was released by the same label on DVD. In May 2008, Polish label Metal Mind Productions released a remaster of Hellig Usvart with three bonus tracks from the 2007 live album. In 2018, Soundmass released Hellig Usvart on vinyl and later reissued it on CD in 2019 for the album's twenty-fifth anniversary.

=== Live performances ===
Horde gave their first live performance at Nordic Fest in Oslo on 3 November 2006, with Jayson Sherlock as drummer and vocalist and with help from three members of the Christian unblack metal band Drottnar under the stage names Kvest, Bøddel, and Gestalt. The band played its second live show at Immortal Metal Fest, Finland on 17 April 2010, with the same live line-up as Nordic Fest. According to the festival's website, Sherlock agreed to play the show because the festival celebrated its tenth anniversary. Horde was also announced to play at the Blast of Eternity festival in Germany in November 2010.

== Musical style ==
"Invert the Inverted Cross"
Sample of "Invert the Inverted Cross" by Horde, from the album Hellig Usvart (1994).

The album Hellig Usvart pioneered the previously unheard of genre of "unblack metal" (sometimes referred to as "Holy UnBlack Metal"); since its release, major bands such as A Hill to Die Upon, Antestor, and Crimson Moonlight and minor bands such as Dark Endless (also an unblack metal band with one member) and Hortor have emerged as proponents of Christian unblack metal. The album is satirical of the satanic black metal scene in that it twists common black metal phrases into a Christian ideal. The general message of Hellig Usvart is the destruction and rejection of Satan, in favour of God. There is also direct and indirect praise of God throughout the record.

Horde's music is mostly dark, simple, and very fast driving unblack metal-style with high-pitched shrieking or growling vocals. Some tracks, such as "Invert the Inverted Cross", utilise double-bass drum work to drive the song. Keyboards are sprinkled in throughout the album as well and appear on such tracks as "Release and Clothe the Virgin Sacrifice".

== Band members ==
Current members

- Jayson "Anonymous" Sherlock – vocals, drums (1994–present), guitars, bass, keyboards (1994)

Live musicians

- Simon "Pilgrim" Rosen – vocals (2006, 2010)
- Karl Fredrik "Kvest" Lind – guitars (2006, 2010, 2012)
- Bengt "Bøddel" Olsson – guitars (2006, 2010, 2012)
- Håvar "Gestalt" Wormdahl – bass (2006, 2010, 2012)

Timeline

== Discography ==
Studio albums

- Hellig Usvart (1994)

Live albums

- The Day of Total Armageddon Holocaust – Alive in Oslo (2007)

Video albums

- The Day of Total Armageddon Holocaust – Alive in Oslo (2007)
