= Break the Curse =

Demo album by Mortification
- Released: 1990
- Recorded: April 1990
- Studio: Oasis Studios in Melbourne, Australia; Timbertop Recording Studios in Ringwood, Victoria, Australia
- Genre: Christian metal; thrash metal; death metal
- Length: 32:08
- Label: Nuclear Blast, Rowe Productions, Roxx Records, Soundmass
- Producer: Doug Saunders, Markus Staiger

Mortification chronology
Break the Curse (1990)	Mortification (1991)

Professional ratings
Review scores
Source	Rating
Cross Rhythms	Review 1: Review 2:
Powermetal.de	9.50

Break the Curse is a 1990 demo album by the Australian Christian death metal band Mortification. It was re-released in 1994 as Break the Curse 1990. The album focuses on Mortification's thrash metal style rather than their later death metal. Several of the album's songs were re-recorded for other Mortification albums. It was re-released on Rowe Productions in 2001 with updated artwork, an updated album booklet, and remastered audio. The album was re-released on Roxx Records as Break the Curse 1990–2010: 20th Anniversary Gold Edition in 2010 as a two-disc set with a CD containing bonus tracks and a DVD containing footage from Mortification's first crossover concert on 15 June 1990 at Harvest Centre in Melbourne, Australia, and later on vinyl as Break the Curse 1990: 25th Anniversary in July 2015. In 2022, the album was re-released as Break the Curse on Soundmass with remastered audio and a second disc containing the audio from the 2010 DVD.

== Recording history ==
Break the Curse was recorded in April 1990 while vocalist/bassist Steve Rowe, drummer Jayson Sherlock, and guitarist Cameron Hall were in the Australian Christian metal band Lightforce. Recording sessions took place at Oasis Studios in Melbourne and Timbertop Recording Studios in Ringwood, Victoria. The original version of Break the Curse was a cassette tape-based demo with six songs. The band was renamed to Mortification shortly afterward. On Mortification's self-titled debut studio album, the song "Infectious Growth" was renamed "The Destroyer Beholds". In November 1993, the demo was remastered by Doug Saunders at Toybox Studios in Northcote, Victoria, and four more songs were included.

== Track listing ==
All tracks are written by Lightforce

Side One (Lightforce Break the Curse demo)
No.	Title	Lyrics	Music	Length
1.	"Journey of Reconciliation^{[a]}"	Jayson Sherlock; Steve Rowe	Sherlock	4:27
2.	"Blood Sacrifice"	Rowe	Rowe	3:35
3.	"Brutal Warfare^{[a]}"	Rowe	Sherlock; Rowe	4:02

Side Two
No.	Title	Lyrics	Music	Length
4.	"Illusion of Life"	Cameron Hall	Hall	4:56
5.	"Break the Curse^{[a]}"	Rowe	Rowe	2:39
6.	"Impulsation^{[b]}"	Rowe	Rowe	4:30
Total length:				24:09

All tracks are written by Mortification

Mortification Break the Curse 1990
No.	Title	Lyrics	Music	Length
1.	"Blood Sacrifice"			3:34
2.	"Brutal Warfare"			4:01
3.	"Impulsation"			4:27
4.	"Turn^{[a]}"	Sherlock	Sherlock	0:56
5.	"New Beginnings"	Rowe	Rowe	2:36
6.	"Break the Curse"			2:37
7.	"Illusion of Life"			4:55
8.	"Your Last Breath"	Sherlock	Rowe	3:24
9.	"Journey of Reconciliation"			4:26
10.	"The Majestic Infiltration of Order^{[a]}^{[c]}"	Rowe	Rowe	1:07
Total length:				32:08

^{a} Re-recorded for Mortification's self-titled debut studio album (1991)
^{b} Re-recorded for Post Momentary Affliction (1993)
^{c} Re-recorded as "God Rulz" on Hammer of God (1999)

Nuclear Blast version exclusive bonus track
No.	Title	Length
11.	"Butchered Mutilation"	4:46
Total length:		36:54

Break the Curse 1990–2010: 20th Anniversary Gold Edition bonus tracks
No.	Title	Length
11.	"Time Crusaders (studio version)"	4:43
12.	"Eyes of Destruction^{[d]}"	5:37
13.	"Envision a Beginning/Buried into Obscurity^{[e]}"	5:34
14.	"Steve talks/Noah Was a Knower^{[e]}"	4:07
15.	"Interview with Steve^{[e]}"	10:51
Total length:		63:03

^{d} Song from Lightforce's debut album, Battlezone (1987)
^{e} Songs from Noah Sat Down and Listened to the Mortification Live E.P. While Having a Coffee (1996)

Break the Curse 1990–2010: 20th Anniversary Gold Edition (2010 DVD)/Live 1990 (2022 disc two)
No.	Title	Length
1.	"Blood Sacrifice"	3:49
2.	"Brutal Warfare"	3:54
3.	"Illusion of Life"	4:41
4.	"Break the Curse"	2:40
5.	"Journey of Reconciliation"	4:12
6.	"Searching"	5:55
7.	"Infectious Growth"	3:17
8.	"City Streets"	5:09
9.	"Impulsation"	4:28
10.	"Bathed in Blood"	3:39
11.	"Eyes of Destruction"	4:40
12.	"Your Last Breath"	3:15
13.	"New Beginnings"	2:39
14.	"The Majestic Infiltration of Order/Turn"	1:42
Total length:		54:08

Break the Curse 1990: 25th Anniversary bonus track
No.	Title	Length
11.	"Time Crusaders (studio version)"	4:43
Total length:		36:51

== Personnel ==
Lightforce/Mortification

- Steve Rowe – vocals, bass guitar
- Jayson Sherlock – drums
- Cameron Hall – guitars

Production

- Doug Saunders – producer, engineer (Lightforce version), remastering (1994 Mortification version)
- Markus Staiger – executive producer (Mortification version)

Additional personnel

- Dave Berryman – photography
- Greg Haur – layout (Lightforce version)
- Steve Dash – cover art (Lightforce version)
- Mike Maxwell – cover illustration (Mortification version)
- Scott Waters (Ultimatum) – design, layout (2022 version)
- Paul D. Clifford – remastering at PCP Studios in Australia (2022 version)
- Rob Colwell – live track remastering at Bombworks Sound in McKinney, Texas (2022 version)
