= Hammer of God (album) =

Studio album by Mortification
- Released: 27 July 1999
- Recorded: February–March 1999
- Studio: Steve Rowe's Hammer of God Studio in Melbourne, Australia
- Genre: Christian metal; thrash metal; heavy metal; power metal
- Length: 70:42
- Label: Metal Blade, Nuclear Blast, Metal Mind Productions, Soundmass
- Producer: Mark McCormack

Mortification chronology
Triumph of Mercy (1998)	Hammer of God (1999)	10 Years Live Not Dead (2000)

Professional ratings
Review scores
Source	Rating
Cross Rhythms	9/10 stars
HM Magazine	link

Hammer of God is the eighth studio album by the Australian Christian death metal band Mortification, released on 27 July 1999.

It was provided to celebrate their tenth year, sales of 250,000 albums in Europe and the United States.

The group promoted the album with a European tour.

It contains three demo versions of tracks that were included on the band's 1998 studio album Triumph of Mercy. The song "God Rulz" is a re-recorded version of the track "The Majestic Infiltration of Order" from both Mortification's self-titled debut studio album and their Break the Curse demo album. A reissue of Hammer of God was released in 2008 on Metal Mind Productions, which removed one of the demo tracks and included three bonus tracks. In 2021, a reissue was released by Soundmass with new remastering, five bonus tracks, an updated cover, and a second disc containing the 10 Years Live Not Dead album.

== Reception ==
In October 1999, Alex Figgis of Cross Rhythms gave Hammer of God a nine out of ten score and said in his review of the album, "Steve Rowe and crew return with what is arguably their finest set of original compositions to date."

== Track listing ==
All lyrics are written by Steve Rowe unless otherwise noted; all music is composed by Steve Rowe unless otherwise noted.

No.	Title	Lyrics	Music	Length
1.	"Metal Crusade"			7:13
2.	"Martyrs"		Steve Rowe; Lincoln Bowen	5:26
3.	"Lock Up the Night"			3:29
4.	"In the Woods^{[a]}"		Keith Bannister	2:56
5.	"A Pearl^{[b]}"			6:14
6.	"Hammer of God"			3:43
7.	"Liberal Mediocrity"	Bowen	Bowen	3:47
8.	"Extreme Conditions"			3:56
9.	"Ride the Light"			3:19
10.	"D.W.A.M." (Daniel Was A Mosher)			1:59
11.	"Medley"			7:29
12.	"God Rulz"			1:32
13.	"At War with War" (97 demo version^{2})			4:30
14.	"Visited by an Angel" (97 demo version^{2})			4:46
15.	"Unified Truth" (97 demo version^{1 and 2})			5:09
16.	"Metal Crusade" (instrumental version (3:56 on the 2021 reissue))			5:09
Total length:				70:42

^{1.} Song not included on the 2008 reissue.

^{2.} Songs not included on the 2021 reissue.

2008 reissue bonus tracks
No.	Title	Length
16.	"Hammer of God (Live 1999)^{2}"	3:46
17.	"Martyrs (Live 1999)^{2}"	6:31
18.	"Liberal Mediocrity (Live 1999)^{2}"	3:47
Total length:		79:39

^{2.} Songs from 10 Years Live Not Dead (2000).

2021 reissue bonus tracks (disc one)
No.	Title	Length
14.	"Hammer of God" (Live 2001)	3:36
15.	"Martyrs" (Live 2001)	5:26
16.	"Lock Up the Night" (Live 1999)	3:23
17.	"Extreme Conditions" (Live 1999)	3:48
18.	"Liberal Mediocrity" (Live 1999)	3:38
Total length:		74:57

"10 Years Live Not Dead" 2021 reissue bonus tracks (disc two)
No.	Title	Length
1.	"Dead Man Walking" (Live 1999)	4:13
2.	"Buried into Obscurity" (Live 1999)	3:18
3.	"Medley" (Live 1999)	7:50
4.	"Martyrs" (Live 1999)	6:31
5.	"Peace in the Galaxy" (Live 1999)	6:09
6.	"Hammer of God" (Live 1999)	3:46
7.	"Influence" (Live 1999)	5:30
8.	"Steve Thanks" (Live 1999)	1:06
9.	"Mephibosheth" (Live 1999)	3:47
10.	"Chapel of Hope" (Live 1999)	4:37
11.	"Liberal Mediocrity" (Live 1999)	3:48
12.	"God Rulz" (Live 1999)	1:54
13.	"King of Kings" (Live 1999)	0:26
Total length:		53:02

== Personnel ==
Mortification

- Steve Rowe – vocals, bass guitar
- Lincoln Bowen – guitar
- Keith Bannister – drums

Additional musicians

- Mark McCormack – piano, keyboards
- Sally Peart – harp
- Leighton Rowe – ending vocals on "God Rulz"
- Dougie, Joyce Madil, Sally Peart, Tim Perry, Johny Stoj, Rod Strong – backing vocals
Production
- Steve Rowe – executive production
- Mark McCormack – producer, engineer

Additional personnel

- Calvin Vice – cover artwork (original version)
- Phil Gibson, Mark Kelson for SCREWart – layout
- 10 Years Live Not Dead recorded 1 October 1999 at the Black Stump Festival in Appin, New South Wales, Australia
- Scott Waters (Ultimatum) – cover artwork (2021 version, Hammer of God)
- Tobias Jäpel – remastering (2021 version)
- Phil Lake – live engineer (2021 version, disc two)
- Mark McCormack, Fab – mix engineers (2021 version, disc two live tracks)
- Troy Dumire – cover painting (2021 version, 10 Years Live Not Dead)

== Notes ==
^{[a]}The song "In the Woods" is incorrectly titled "A Pearl" on the 2021 remaster track listing and CD metadata.

^{[b]}The song "A Pearl" is incorrectly titled "In the Woods" on the 2021 remaster track listing and CD metadata.
