= Realm of the Skelataur =

Studio album by Mortification
- Released: 9 March 2015
- Recorded: September 2014–October 2014
- Studios: Bayside Studios in Melbourne, Australia
- Genres: Christian metal; death metal; thrash metal
- Length: 41:53
- Labels: Rowe Productions, Soundmass
- Producers: Mark McCormack, Steve Rowe, Lincoln Bowen

Mortification chronology
Scribe of the Pentateuch (2012)	Realm of the Skelataur (2015)

Professional ratings
Review scores
Source	Rating
The Metal Resource	8-10

Realm of the Skelataur is the fourteenth studio album by the Australian Christian death metal band Mortification. It was released on 9 March 2015. A reissue was released on Soundmass in 2022 with a second disc containing a live recording to celebrate the band's 25th anniversary at EasterFest on 3 April 2015.

== Title ==
Jefferson Guedes Giammelaro wrote "The Mortification has already announced some time ago that it would launch a new CD, and now the band released the name of the work, which will be "Realm Of The Skelator", and is already in pre-production phase.

Steve Rowe said that it would be brutal, and have a mixture of styles like death metal, grindcore, thrash metal and traditional heavy metal.

Recording took place between September 2014 to October 2014, with the sound engineer Mark McCormack.

== Critical reception ==
Peter John Willboughby reported "It is worth mentioning that the production on here is much better than their previous album and makes a fitting end to the Australian megabeast that is Mortification."

Parat Magazine stated "In March MORTFICATION reminded the new album 'Realm Of The Skeletaur,' which was the reason for Steve to reach out and ask him lots of attractions. Whether his confession what he wants, one must leave: It's a tremendously brave man who fell through hard music. Despite the fact that it is almost paralyzed and plagued him and many other health problems."

Matthias Salomon reports "If I had to describe 'Realm Of The Skeletaur' with an adjective, it would be 'funny'. Perhaps it is because death metal and Christian world views are not all too well tolerated. Perhaps, however, it is only the compulsive attempt to put prefabricated texts into some melodies. But somehow there is also much cult in this album and in MORTIFICATION. Whoever has been passing through his own thing for so long, may well be a curious addition to the metallic encyclopaedia."

== Track listing ==
All lyrics are written by Steve Rowe unless otherwise noted; all music is composed by Steve Rowe unless otherwise noted.

No.	Title	Lyrics	Music	Length
1.	"The Cost"	Steve Rowe; Andrew Esnouf	Rowe; Esnouf; Lincoln Bowen	7:00
2.	"Feed Your Hungry Ears"
3.	"Extrinsick Forces"	Bowen	Bowen	2:39
4.	"Realm of the Skelataur"			4:35
5.	"Slaughter Demon Headz"			0:55
6.	"Our Anthem" (5:33 on the 2022 reissue)			5:44
7.	"40 Day Fast"			0:17
8.	"Total Thrashing Death"			4:11
9.	"Enrapture"			5:04
10.	"Grave Sucking"	Esnouf	Bowen	0:06
11.	"Pushing Weird Buttons"			7:06
Total length:				41:53

"Live 2015" 2022 reissue bonus tracks (disc two)
No.	Title	Length
1.	"Let Me Hear Some Noise!" (Live 2015)	0:45
2.	"Feed Your Hungry Ears" (Live 2015)	3:59
3.	"Extrinsick Forces" (Live 2015)	2:49
4.	"Brutal Warfare" (Live 2015)	4:13
5.	"Hammer of God" (Live 2015)	5:01
6.	"ExtraDieFor" (Live 2015)	3:23
7.	"Too Much Pain" (Live 2015)	3:20
8.	"Steve Talks 1" (Live 2015)	3:38
9.	"The Destroyer Beholds" (Live 2015)	3:48
10.	"Erasing the Goblin" (Live 2015)	5:12
11.	"Steve Talks 2" (Live 2015)	3:36
12.	"Blood Sacrifice" (Live 2015)	5:32
13.	"The Cost" (Live 2015)	9:47
14.	"Live by the Sword" (Live 2015)	5:53
15.	"Scrolls of the Megilloth" (Live 2015)	3:11
16.	"God Rulz" (Live 2015)	1:19
17.	"J.G.S.H. (Jesus Grind Satan's Head)" (Live 2015)	0:30
18.	"Killing Evil" (Live 2015)	0:19
19.	"Slaughter Demon Headz" (Live 2015)	0:50
20.	"40 Day Fast" (Live 2015)	0:14
21.	"Grave Sucking" (Live 2015)	0:19
Total length:		67:05

== Personnel ==
Mortification

- Steve Rowe – vocals, bass guitar
- Lincoln Bowen – guitars
- Andrew Esnouf – drums

Production

- Mark McCormack – producer, mixing, mastering
- Steve Rowe – producer, mixing, pre-production
- Lincoln Bowen – producer, mixing
- Neil Kearan (Nak Recording) – pre-production, pre-production engineering

Additional personnel

- Michael Maxwell – cover artwork
- Brent Furtelli, Jason Parkin – photography
- Tobias Jäpel – layout (original version)
- Scott Waters (Ultimatum) – design, layout (2022 version)
- AceMedia Productions – live audio (Live 2015)
