= Scourged Flesh =

- Origin: Perth, Western Australia
- Genres: Christian metal, death metal, thrash metal
- Years active: 2006–present
- Labels: Rowe, Soundmass
- Members: Todd Kilgallon; Daniel Holmes; Simon Hoggett; Dave Kilgallon
- Past members: Simon Bracegirlde; Scott Lockyer
- Website: Scourged Flesh of Myspace

Scourged Flesh is a Christian metal band that originated in Perth, Western Australia. They perform thrash and death metal. The band has released three studio albums: Released From Damnation (2006), Bury the Lies (2007), and Welcome to the End of the World (2009).

== Background ==
The band started in 2006 with brothers Todd (guitar, vocals) and Dave Kilgallon (drums), and bassist Simon Bracegirdle. After the first album, Released From Damnation (2006), Bracegirdle was replaced with Scott Lockyer. After Bury the Lies, Simon Hogget replaced Lockyer, and Daniel Holmes joined as a second guitarist. In 2008, Dave Kilgallon joined the fellow Australian band Mortification as their drummer.

== Members ==
Current

- Todd Kilgallon – vocals, guitar (2006–present)
- Daniel Holmes – guitar (2008–present)
- Simon Hoggett – bass (2008–present)
- Dave Kilgallon – drums (2006–present)

Former

- Simon Bracegirdle – bass (2006–2007)
- Scott Lockyer – bass (2007–2008)

Timeline

== Discography ==
Studio albums

- Released From Damnation (2006)
- Bury the Lies (2007)
- Welcome to the End of the World (2009)
