= Post Momentary Affliction =

Studio album by Mortification
- Released: 1993
- Recorded: 1993
- Studio: Toybox Studios in Northcote, Melbourne, Australia
- Genre: Christian metal; death metal; thrash metal
- Length: 50:48
- Label: Intense, Nuclear Blast
- Producer: Doug Saunders, Mark Staiger

Mortification chronology
Scrolls of the Megilloth (1992)	Post Momentary Affliction (1993)	Live Planetarium (1993)

Intense Records Cover Art

Post Momentary Affliction is the third studio album by Australian Christian death metal band Mortification, released in 1993. The album's sound has Mortification returning to their thrash metal roots, but with death metal elements still showing. It contains an alternate recording of the track "Impulsation" from the band's Break the Curse demo album. Post Momentary Affliction was bundled with Mortification's 1992 album Scrolls of the Megilloth on Nuclear Blast and included "Butchered Mutilation" as a bonus track, releasing on 18 November 1996. In 2008, a reissue was released by Metal Mind Productions, which also included "Butchered Mutilation" and three live tracks. Soundmass released reissues in 2020 and 2022, with the former having three live tracks and the latter having new remastering and two discs, with the second CD containing fifteen live tracks^{1}; both reissues include "Butchered Mutilation". In 2010, HM Magazine ranked Post Momentary Affliction No. 70 on the Top 100 Christian metal albums of all-time list.

== Recording ==
Post Momentary Affliction was recorded at Toybox Studios in Northcote, Melbourne, Australia. Pre-production took place at Jamtim Studios in Cheltenham, Melbourne. The album was released on Intense Records and Nuclear Blast, with both versions having different cover artwork; the 2020 reissue contains both covers.

== Track listing ==
All tracks are written by Mortification

No.	Title	Lyrics	Music	Length
1.	"Allusions from the Valley of Darkness"			0:47
2.	"From the Valley of Shadows"	Michael Carlisle	Carlisle	8:04
3.	"Human Condition"	Steve Rowe	Rowe	4:36
4.	"Distarnish Priest"	Rowe	Rowe	7:24
5.	"Black Lion of the Mind" (Instrumental)			0:27
6.	"Grind Planetarium"	Rowe	Rowe	4:27
7.	"Pride Sanitarium" (Instrumental)		Mortification	1:18
8.	"Overseer"	Carlisle	Carlisle	9:17
9.	"This Momentary Affliction"	Carlisle	Carlisle	0:51
10.	"Flight of Victory" (Instrumental)		Rowe	1:51
11.	"Impulsation^{[a]}"	Rowe	Rowe	4:24
12.	"Liquid Assets" (Instrumental)			0:33
13.	"Vital Fluids"	Rowe	Rowe	6:20
14.	"The Sea of Forgetfulness" (Instrumental)			0:29
Total length:				50:48

^{a} Re-recorded song from Break the Curse

Bonus track on re-releases
No.	Title	Length
15.	"Butchered Mutilation"	4:46
Total length:		55:34

2008 reissue exclusive bonus tracks
No.	Title	Length
16.	"Grind Planetarium (Live)"	5:16
17.	"Distarnish Priest (Live)"	7:51
18.	"From the Valley of Shadows (Live)"	8:07
Total length:		76:48

2020 reissue exclusive bonus tracks
No.	Title	Length
16.	"Distarnish Priest (Live 1996)"	7:09
17.	"Grind Planetarium (Live 2002)"	5:45
18.	"Medley (Live 2002)"	7:25
Total length:		75:53

"Live 1994" 2022 reissue bonus tracks (disc two)
No.	Title	Length
1.	"From the Valley of Shadows" (Live 1994)	8:28
2.	"Impulsation" (Live 1994)	5:06
3.	"Scrolls of the Megilloth" (Live 1994)	3:20
4.	"Grind Planetarium" (Live 1994)	5:56
5.	"Starlight" (Live 1994)	5:33
6.	"Blood World" (Live 1994)	5:58
7.	"Death Reqiuem" (Live 1994)	5:27
8.	"Break the Curse" (Live 1994)	3:04
9.	"Distarnish Priest" (Live 1994)	6:48
10.	"The Destroyer Beholds" (Live 1994)	3:26
11.	"Symbiosis" (Live 1994)	5:41
12.	"Time Crusaders" (Live 1994)	4:53
13.	"God Rulz" (Live 1994)	1:14
14.	"This Momentary Affliction" (Live 1994)	0:25
15.	"J.G.S.H. (Jesus Grind Satan's Head)" (Live 1994)	0:53
Total length:		66:18

== Personnel ==
Mortification

- Steve Rowe – vocals, bass guitar
- Michael Carlisle – guitar
- Jayson Sherlock – drums

Additional musician

- Doug Saunders – keyboards

Production

- Mark Staiger – executive producer
- Doug Saunders – producer, sound effects
- Mark Tulk – assistant engineer
- Doug Doyle – mastering at Digital Brothers in Costa Mesa, California

Additional personnel

- Jayson Sherlock – cover artwork
- Michael Carlisle – cover concept
- Andrew "Surfie" Stuivenberg – photography
- Scott Waters (Ultimatum) – design, layout (2020 and 2022 versions)
- Paul D. Clifford – remastering at PCP Studios in Australia (2022 version)
- Rob Colwell – live audio mastering at Bombworks Sound in McKinney, Texas (2022 version)
- Patrick Wolf – live audio tracks (2022 version)

== Notes ==
^{1.} The 2022 reissue live tracks were recorded at Cornerstone Festival on 1 July 1994 in Bushnell, Illinois.
