= Blood World =

Studio album by Mortification
- Released: 1994
- Recorded: March 1994–April 1994
- Studio: Saint Andrews Studios in Melbourne, Australia
- Genre: Christian metal; thrash metal; groove metal
- Length: 44:42
- Label: Intense, Nuclear Blast
- Producer: Mark McCormack, Mortification

Mortification chronology
Live Planetarium (1993)	Blood World (1994)	Primitive Rhythm Machine (1995)

Professional ratings
Review scores
Source	Rating
Cross Rhythms	7/10 stars

Blood World is the fourth studio album by Australian Christian death metal band Mortification, released in 1994. The songs "Your Life", "J.G.S.H." and "Love Song" were included on the Tourniquet/Mortification Collector's Edition CD Single in 1994; the disc also contained a segment discussing Mortification's history, from the video release of Live Planetarium, and material from American Christian metal band Tourniquet's album Vanishing Lessons. Blood World was a commercial hit and the band's most successful album.

The album focuses more on thrash metal, with classic metal, groove metal and hardcore punk influences, and contains less death metal influences than previous albums. Instead of Steve Rowe's growls, the album mainly contains his shouting-style singing, but growls do make occasional appearances.

== Reception ==
According to Australian Music Online, "the strange combination of extreme styles began setting Mortification apart from the crowd of same sounding bands and widened the band's audience as they became quickly recognised as innovators and not imitators." Blood World received rave reviews in America and Europe. Horror Infernal Magazine gave the album 13 out of 13 points.

== Reissue ==
A reissue of Blood World was released in 2008 by Metal Mind Productions and contained four bonus tracks. A second reissue, by Soundmass, was released in 2020 and contained four bonus tracks.

== Track listing ==
All tracks are written by Mortification

No.	Title	Lyrics	Music	Length
1.	"Clan of the Light"	Steve Rowe	Rowe	4:20
2.	"Blood World"	Rowe	Rowe	4:12
3.	"Starlight"	Michael Carlisle	Carlisle	4:49
4.	"Your Life"	Rowe	Rowe	4:14
5.	"Monks of the High Lord"	Rowe	Rowe	6:16
6.	"Symbiosis^{[a]}"	Carlisle	Carlisle	7:10
7.	"Love Song"	Rowe	Rowe	4:02
8.	"Live by the Sword"	Rowe	Rowe	3:24
9.	"J.G.S.H. (Jesus Grind Satan's Head)"	Rowe	Rowe	0:29
10.	"Dark Allusions"	Carlisle	Carlisle	5:43
Total length:				44:42

^{a} previously recorded on Live Planetarium (1993)

2008 reissue bonus tracks
No.	Title	Length
11.	"Altar of God^{[b]}"	5:58
12.	"New Beginnings (Live 1996)^{[c]}"	3:00
13.	"Blood World (Live 1996)^{[c]}"	4:20
14.	"Entering the Eternal Dawn"	6:33
Total length:		64:33

^{b} song from Relentless (2002)
^{c} songs from Live Without Fear (1996)

2020 reissue bonus tracks
No.	Title	Length
11.	"Entering the Eternal Dawn"	6:27
12.	"Blood World (Live 1996)"	4:18
13.	"Your Life (Live 2001)"	4:31
14.	"Medley (Live 2007)"	7:06
Total length:		67:06

== Personnel ==
Mortification

- Steve Rowe – vocals, bass guitar
- Michael Carlisle – guitar
- Phil Gibson – drums

Production

- Mark McCormack, Mortification – producer, mixing, recording

Additional personnel

- Mortification – cover concept
- Dave Berryman – photography
- Matthew Duffy – art direction
- Jack Wedell – design (original version)
- Chris Dean – cover artwork (original version)
- Tobias Jäpel – cover artwork (2020 version)
- Scott Waters (Ultimatum) – layout, design (2020 version)
