= Scrolls of the Megilloth =

Studio album by Mortification
- Released: 28 August 1992
- Recorded: 7 December 1991; April 1992
- Studios: Studio RBX in Richmond, Melbourne, Australia
- Genres: Christian metal; death metal; grindcore
- Length: 59:25
- Labels: Intense, Nuclear Blast
- Producers: Doug Saunders, Mortification

Mortification chronology
Mortification (1991)	Scrolls of the Megilloth (1992)	Post Momentary Affliction (1993)

Singles from Scrolls of the Megilloth
- 1. "Scrolls of the Megilloth" Released: 25 October 1992

Professional ratings
Review scores
Source	Rating
Jesus Freak Hideout	4.5/5 stars

Scrolls of the Megilloth is the second studio album by Australian Christian death metal band Mortification. It was released on 28 August 1992. The band's most famous release, this album is full-on death metal, with the thrash metal roots barely showing, and possibly their most extreme album to date. According to AllMusic, the album "garnered the band some attention from the heavy metal underground" and contains "some of the most frightening vocals ever recorded." In 2010, HM Magazine ranked Scrolls of the Megilloth number 17 on the Top 100 Christian Metal Albums of All Time list with Van Pelt stating that "Though the band has been living it down ever since, this album raised the standard of Christian grindcore to almost unattainable levels."

Several reissues of Scrolls of the Megilloth have been released on various record labels. It was bundled with Mortification's 1993 album Post Momentary Affliction on Nuclear Blast and included two live bonus tracks, releasing on 18 November 1996. A bundle that contained Scrolls of the Megilloth and Mortification's self-titled debut studio album was released on KMG Records in 1998 and on Rowe Productions in 2015, with the latter being exclusively on cassette. A reissue was released on Metal Mind Productions in 2008 and included three live bonus tracks. Soundmass Records released reissues in 2005, 2020, and 2022; the first reissue has four demo tracks, the second has three live tracks, and the third, titled Scrolls of the Megilloth: 30th Anniversary Edition, has new remastering and two discs, with the second CD containing eight demos and six live tracks^{1}.

== Recording ==
Scrolls of the Megilloth was recorded in April 1992 at Studio RBX in Richmond, Melbourne and mixed and produced by Doug Saunders at Toybox Studios in Northcote, Melbourne; Steve Rowe, Mortification's vocalist and bass guitarist, requested $10,000 to record the album. The album's eight demo tracks were recorded on 7 December 1991 at Jamtin Studios in Chentelham, Melbourne. Mortification's line-up consisted of the bassist-vocalist Steve Rowe, guitarist Michael Carlisle, and drummer Jayson Sherlock. Andrew Tompkins, from the Australian Christian metal band Paramaecium, and Roger Martinez, from the American Christian metal band Vengeance Rising, contributed additional background vocals. Both Carlisle and Sherlock also did background vocals, and Sherlock played lead guitar on the last song "Ancient Prophecy" because Carlisle was a more experienced rhythm guitarist than lead guitarist, therefore the album does not contain guitar solos.

== Music ==
Scrolls of the Megilloth is characterized by Jayson Sherlock's quick and unconventional blast beat drumming, Michael Carlisle's aggressive but precise rhythm guitar work, Steve Rowe's double layered "grind baritone vocals of extreme reality", and high tuned, apparent, and groovy bass guitar playing. The album begins with the intro of the song "Nocturnal", consisting of noises of the night from chirring crickets to howling animals, creating a dark cult horror movie atmosphere; an ominous drum beat slowly becomes louder, accompanied by a drop D tuned guitar riff, turns into a chaotic speed as the vocals by Steve Rowe growl the words "Nocturnal/Creatures of the night" with the word "Creatures" sung in a frightening shrieking voice. After this, the album continues on the grindcore influenced death metal direction, reminiscent of the British bands Bolt Thrower, Carcass, and Napalm Death. A mostly up-tempo album, the songs "Raise the Chalice" and the epic "Ancient Prophecy" take a more mid-tempo approach. "Death Requiem" contains a gloomy speaking voice interpreting a funeral event. Rowe's vocals get extremely guttural on a verse on the song "Ancient Prophecy" that cites a prophecy from the King James Version of the Bible in Isaiah 53:5. The album's title track, "Scrolls of the Megilloth", which begins with a haunting organ melody before turning into a chaotic tune, is one of the best known songs on the album and was released as a single.

== Lyrics and themes ==
The lyrics on Scrolls of the Megilloth are as extreme as the music, dealing with the common themes of death metal such as death, horror, occultism, and violence from a Christian point of view: "Terminate Damnation" is about spiritual warfare against evil and moral impurity, "Eternal Lamentation" has the ungodly screaming in agony in Hell, and "Necromanicide" warns against communicating with the deceased through spiritism because "only demons answer their call". The title "Scrolls of the Megilloth" is a term in the Old Testament that means The Five Scrolls (Five Megillot): Ruth, Esther, Song of Solomon, Lamentations, and Ecclesiastes. The song deals with the purposes of these books. According to the 2005 reissue liner notes, Steve Rowe studied at a Bible college a year before the album was recorded and he learned that these books were read at feasts and celebrations of significant Jewish dates. Rowe writes: "When we read 2 Timothy 3:16 we realised that all scriptures are there for a purpose and should all be studied to guide us."

== Track listing ==
All tracks are written by Mortification.

No.	Title	Lyrics	Music	Length
1.	"Nocturnal"	Steve Rowe	Rowe	6:10
2.	"Terminate Damnation"	Jayson Sherlock	Sherlock	6:18
3.	"Eternal Lamentation"	Michael Carlisle	Carlisle	6:29
4.	"Raise the Chalice"	Rowe	Rowe	4:47
5.	"Lymphosarcoma"	Rowe	Rowe; Carlisle	6:02
6.	"Scrolls of the Megilloth"	Rowe	Rowe	4:25
7.	"Death Requiem"	Carlisle	Carlisle	5:08
8.	"Necromanicide"	Sherlock	Sherlock	4:56
9.	"Inflamed"	Carlisle	Carlisle	3:26
10.	"Ancient Prophecy^{[a]}"	Sherlock	Sherlock	11:42
Total length:				59:25

^{a} Song not included on the 2015 cassette reissue.

1996 reissue exclusive bonus tracks
No.	Title	Length
11.	"Brutal Warfare (Live)"	4:14
12.	"Time Crusaders (Live)"	4:52
Total length:		68:39

2005 reissue bonus tracks
No.	Title	Length
11.	"Terminate Damnation" (1991 Demo)	6:07
12.	"Lymphosarcoma" (1991 Demo)	6:02
13.	"Necromanicide" (1991 Demo)	4:24
14.	"Scrolls of the Megilloth" (1991 Demo)	3:08
Total length:		79:14

2008 reissue exclusive bonus tracks
No.	Title	Length
11.	"Time Crusaders (Live)"	5:54
12.	"Inflamed (Live)"	3:38
13.	"The Destroyer Beholds (Live)"	3:27
Total length:		72:32

2020 reissue exclusive bonus tracks
No.	Title	Length
11.	"Terminate Damnation (Live 1992)"	6:21
12.	"Eternal Lamentation (Live 1992)"	6:28
13.	"Necromanicide (Live 1992)"	4:29
Total length:		76:51

30th Anniversary Edition "Demos & Live 1992" 2022 reissue bonus tracks (disc two)
No.	Title	Length
1.	"Nocturnal" (1991 Demo)	4:31
2.	"Terminate Damnation" (1991 Demo)	6:05
3.	"Raise the Chalice" (1991 Demo)	4:46
4.	"Lymphosarcoma" (1991 Demo)	6:01
5.	"Scrolls of the Megilloth" (1991 Demo)	3:08
6.	"Death Requiem" (1991 Demo)	4:46
7.	"Necromanicide" (1991 Demo)	4:23
8.	"Inflamed" (1991 Demo)	3:24
9.	"Scrolls of the Megilloth" (Live 1992)	3:24
10.	"Terminate Damnation" (Live 1992)	6:12
11.	"Satan's Doom" (Live 1992)	6:26
12.	"Eternal Lamentation" (Live 1992)	6:38
13.	"Lymphosarcoma" (Live 1992)	6:05
14.	"Death Requiem" (Live 1992)	5:30
Total length:		71:25

== Personnel ==
Mortification

- Steve Rowe – lead vocals, bass guitar
- Michael Carlisle – lead and rhythm guitars, backing vocals
- Jayson Sherlock – drums, backing vocals, lead guitar on "Ancient Prophecy"

Additional musicians

- Andrew Tompkins (Paramaecium) – additional backing vocals
- Roger Martinez (Vengeance Rising) – additional backing vocals

Production

- Mortification – producer
- Doug Saunders – producer, engineering
- Alicia Balbi – assistant engineer
- Andrew "Surfie" Stuivenberg – photography

Additional personnel

- Steve Rowe, Jayson Sherlock – cover concept
- Jayson Sherlock – cover design
- Andrew Tompkins – layout (2005 version)
- Scott Waters (Ultimatum) – design, layout (2020 and 2022 versions)
- Paul D. Clifford – remastering at PCP Studios in Australia (2022 version)

== Notes ==
^{1.} The 2022 reissue live tracks were recorded at The Arthouse in Melbourne, Victoria, Australia.
