= Metanoia (Australian band) =

Australia Christian death metal band

- Origin: Townsville, Queensland, Australia
- Genres: Christian death metal, grindcore, deathgrind
- Years active: 1990–2000
- Label: Rowe Productions
- Past members: Justin Smith; Justin Heath; Simon Pankhurst; Steve Bennett; Lisa Bennett; Dylan Speerstra; Ian Northey

Metanoia was a Christian death metal and grindcore band that originated from Townsville, Queensland, Australia. The band formed in 1990 but disbanded in 2000. The band started as a vision of guitarist Steve Bennett's. The main members of the band consisted of husband and wife Steve (Guitars) and Lisa Bennett (Bass) and vocalist Justin 'Yowie' Smith.

== Background ==
Metanoia formed in 1990 by Steve Bennett, with his wife Lisa (Spud) on bass, Dylan Speerstra on drums, and Yowie Smith on vocals. In 1996, the band saw the departure of Speerstra, who was replaced by Ian Northey. In 1998, Smith left the band and was replaced by Simon Pankhurst. The band dissolved in 2000.

== Members ==
Last known line-up

- Ian Northey – drums (1996–1999)
- Simon "Psycho" Pankhurst – vocals (1998–1999)
- Lisa "Spud" Bennett – bass (1990–1999)
- Steve "Yak" Bennett – guitar (1990–1999), rhythm guitar (1999)

Former

- Dylan Speerstra – drums (1990–1996)
- Justin "Yowie" Smith – vocals (1994–1998)
- Justin Heath - lead guitar (1994–1995)

Timeline

== Discography ==
Studio albums

- In Darkness or in Light (1995)
- Don't Walk Dead (1998)
- Time to Die (1999)

Demos

- Demo (1990)
- Screaming Fetus (1994)
- Akeldama (1995)

Splits

- Australian Metal Compilation II - The Raise the Dead (1995)
