= Grave Forsaken =

- Origin: Perth, Western Australia, Australia
- Genres: Christian metal, thrash metal, death metal, doom metal
- Years active: 2004–present
- Labels: Soundmass, Rowe
- Members: Vaughan Gregory; Elias Salmela; Matt Skipworth; Luke Gallagher
- Past members: Tim Steadman; Simon Hoggett; Dave Kilgallon; Richard Sallows
- Website: graveforsaken.com

Grave Forsaken is an Australian Christian metal band, where they primarily play thrash metal, death metal, and doom metal styles of music. They come from Perth, Western Australia. The band started making music in 2004. They have released five studio albums, and they have recorded two extended plays, in their tenure.

== Background ==
Grave Forsaken is a Christian metal band from Perth, Western Australia, having been established in September 2004. Their current members are vocalist and guitarist, Vaughn Gregory, guitarist, Elias Salmela, bassist, Matt Skipworth, and drummer, Luke Gallagher, while their former members were, vocalist and drummer, Tim Steadman, guitarist and drummer, Simon Hoggett, and drummers, Dave Kilgallon and Richard Sallows.

== Music history ==
The band commenced as a musical entity in 2004, with their first release, an extended play, Grave Forsaken, came out independently, in 2005. Their subsequent release, a studio album, Beside the River of Blood, was released in 2006, by Rowe Productions. They released, another extended play, Horror and Sadness, independently in 2007. The second studio album, Destined for Ascension, was released independently in 2008. Their third studio album, This Day Forth, was released by Soundmass Records, in 2009. The fourth studio album, Fight to the Death, was released from Soundmass Records, in 2010. Their fifth studio album, Reap What You Sow, was released in 2012, from Soundmass Records.

== Members ==
Current members

- Vaughn Gregory – vocals, guitar (2004–present)
- Elias Salmela – guitar (2004–present)
- Matt Skipworth – bass (2004–present)
- Luke Gallagher – drums (2011–present)

Former members

- Tim Steadman – vocals, guitar (2004–2008)
- Simon Hoggett – guitar, drums (2008–2010, 2010–2011)
- Dave Kilgallon – drums (2007–2009, 2010–2011)
- Richard Sallows – drums (2009–2010)

== Discography ==
Studio albums

- Beside the River of Blood (2006, Rowe)
- Destined for Ascension (2008, independent)
- This Day Forth (2009, Soundmass)
- Fight to the Death (2010, Soundmass)
- Reap What You Sow (2012, Soundmass)
- The Fight Goes On (2015)
- It Has Begun (2017)
- The Footsteps of God (2020)

EPs

- Grave Forsaken (2005, Independent)
- Horror and Sadness (2007, independent)
- Plugged in the System (2013)
