= Gnashing of Teeth =

Technical metal band from Ohio, US

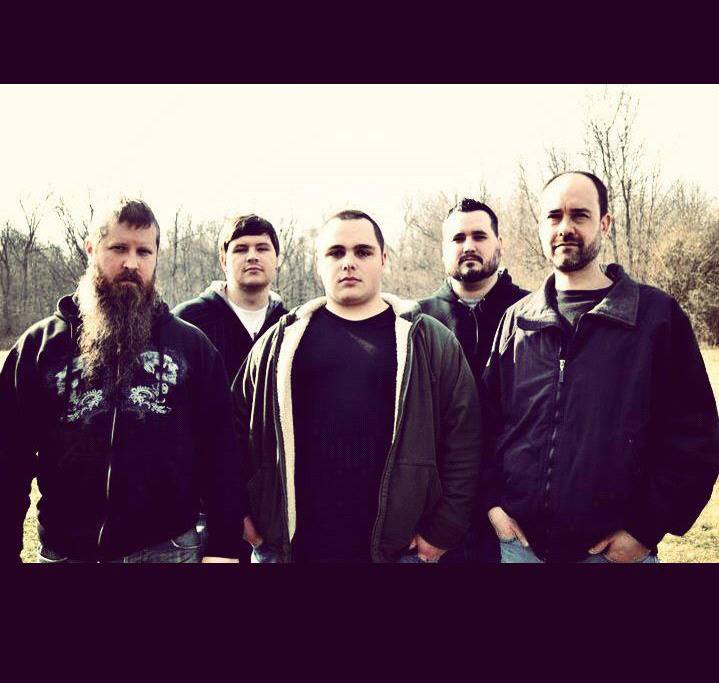
- Gnashing of Teeth in 2014. From left: Duane White, Travis Cooper, Chris McKinney, Kyle Rockwell, Larry Davis

Background information
- Also known as: Enslaved (1993-1999) GoT
- Origin: Dayton, Ohio
- Genres: Technical metal, Christian metal
- Years active: 1993-2016, 2019-2022
- Labels: Rowe, Sacrosanct
- Members: Duane White; Travis Cooper; Larry Davis; Kyle Rockwell; Chris McKinney
- Past members: Ryan Duke; Ryan Lynd; Marc Garman; Josh Deeter
- Website: Facebook

Gnashing of Teeth, originally Enslaved, was an American technical metal band that originated in Dayton, Ohio in 1999. The band has played with bands such as Abated Mass of Flesh, Every Knee Shall Bow, Extol, A Plea for Purging, Wolves at the Gate and Corpus Christi. The band played Cornerstone Festival in 2011.

== History ==
The band started in 1993 with Original members Duane White (guitars/vocals) and Larry Davis (drums) under the name Enslaved. At their inception, they played a style resembling progressive metal. In 1995, they put the band on a brief hiatus. They later reconvened in 1998 and got signed to Rowe Productions. They released their debut self-titled album under Rowe. In 2001, the band recorded a cover of Living Sacrifice's song "No Longer", off of the Reborn, for the Tribute to Living Sacrifice compilation, which consisted of many bands such as Soul Embraced, Kekal and Crutch. In 2003, they released an independent EP titled Nom. After several years of silence, the band reformed in 2010 and released an album titled Walking the Appain Way on Sacrosanct Records. In 2011, the band played Cornerstone Festival. In 2014, Bassist Kyle Rockwell announced his departure from the band. In May 2016, the band announced that they were disbanding after over 20 years. On June 16, 2019, the band announced they were reuniting with the lineup of Chris McKinney, Duane White, Larry Davis, Kyle Rockwell, and Travis Cooper and would be performing at Audiofeed Festival. On September 6, 2019, the band released a new single, titled “Judas Goat”, independently. In May 2023, after Gnashing of Teeth have disbanded in 2022, the band released the unfinished album Golden Rings of the Noses of Swines.

== Members ==
Current Lineup

- Chris McKinney - vocals
- Duane White - guitar, backing vocals (1993–2016, 2019–present)
- Travis Cooper - guitar
- Kyle Rockwell - bass (2007–2009, 2011–2014, 2019-present)
- Larry Davis - drums (1993–2016, 2019–present)

Former

- Ryan Duke - vocals
- Ryan Lynd - guitar
- Marc Garman - bass
- jason holbrook - bass (2008)
- Nate Landis - bass
- Josh Deeter - bass (2014–2016)
- Matt Anderson - bass
- Ian Hilt - guitar
- Mike Wise - vocals
- Jay Myers - guitar

== Discography ==
Studio albums

- Gnashing of Teeth (2000)
- Walking the Appain Way (2010)
- Golden Rings of the Noses of Swines (2023)

EPs

- Nom (2005)

Singles

- ”Judas Goat” (2019)

Other songs

- "No Longer" originally performed by Living Sacrifice; released on the A Tribute to Living Sacrifice album (2001)
