= Steve Rowe =

Australian musician

- Born: Stephen Andrew Rowe; 19 January 1965 (age 61)
- Origin: Melbourne, Victoria, Australia
- Genres: Christian metal, thrash metal, death metal, power metal
- Occupation: Musician
- Instruments: Vocals, bass guitar
- Years active: 1986–present
- Website: soundmass.com/rowe/

Stephen Andrew Rowe (born 19 January 1965) is an Australian musician who is the founder, vocalist and bass guitarist of the Christian death metal band Mortification, which is considered to be a pioneer in the genre. Prior to forming Mortification, he was in a traditional heavy metal-styled Christian band known as LightForce. He was diagnosed with leukemia in 1997, but made a full recovery. He is currently the owner and head of the Rowe Productions record label. In 2015, Rowe announced his retirement from Christian music. However, his career has continued, while Mortification has been inactive the members' side project, Wonrowe Vision, have remained active.

== Early life ==
Steve was first introduced to heavy metal bands like AC/DC and Deep Purple by his older brother Scott when he was just eight years old. By the time he reached the age of 15 his favourite bands were Iron Maiden, Motörhead and Judas Priest. Because Steve grew up in a Baptist home with strong Christian values he became disappointed that the music he enjoyed appeared to be so focused on themes that cut against his faith. In 1980 he began to feel as if he did not fit in with the people he knew at church and started spending his spare time partying with his heavy metal friends.

In 1983 Steve purchased his first bass guitar and began learning how to play. The main influences on his style as he was learning were Lemmy of Motörhead, Joey DeMaio of Manowar, and Steve Harris of Iron Maiden. In that same year a youth pastor from the church he used to attend invited him to come back to church and gave Steve a copy of a Resurrection Band album. The album changed Steve's views on what Christian music could be like and was a major factor in his decision to return to the church. Seeing how much rock music combined with a Christian message had helped him, Steve vowed to form a Christian metal band that would change the world. Initially, he formed a band with a few friends back at his church, but it soon became clear that finding people with the same vision and goals would not be an easy task. It was while he was attempting to start this band that Steve became unhappy with the Church he was attending, and as a result, he left and joined the Harvest Christian Centre, which had engaged in outreach to groups like metalheads and punks. It was here that Steve finally found a home for his Christian metal vision.

== Career ==
After several failed attempts with different bands and constant lineup changes, Steve formed LightForce in 1986. Initially that band was a failure as well as their first lineup, which was disbanded after only one show. Steve then reformed the band with a new lineup that won the "Melbourne Heavy Metal battle of the bands competition" in which it was competing with five secular metal acts. LightForce was instantly accepted into the Australian metal scene and went on to record their first full album Battlezone and tour across Australia. In 1988 the band released the album Mystical Thieves. The album went on to sell very well and they toured constantly in support of its release, opening for bands such as Stryper, Whitecross and Leviticus.

Just when it seemed set for LightForce to make a big name for themselves in the Christian metal scene, two of the band's members announced they were leaving the band. Steve spoke with the remaining members about forming a more extreme thrash metal oriented LightForce with him handling vocal duties as well as playing bass. The remaining members did not think it would work so Steve reformed the band with guitarist Cameron Hall and Jayson Sherlock on drums. The band changed their name to Mortification in 1990 and recorded Break The Curse which was later released in 1994.

Mortification went on to record many more albums and the band is considered to be one of the pioneers in the extreme Christian metal scene. The 1992 album Scrolls of the Megilloth is considered to be a great classic of death metal. In 1997 Steve was diagnosed with leukemia. Despite doctors giving him only hours to live on several occasions and a seemingly failed bone marrow transplant, Steve managed to make a full recovery. Mortification then went on to release the 1998 album Triumph of Mercy which dealt with the personal issues Steve faced while receiving treatment for the disease. Mortification is still currently making music and to date has released 13 studio albums. Steve is also the owner and head of the Rowe Productions record label and has performed guest vocals on a song on Microscopic View of a Telescopic Realm by Tourniquet.

== Rowe Productions ==
Rowe owns a label named Rowe Productions. Here is a list of Current and Former artists.

=== Current Rowe Productions artists ===
- Mortification
- Wonrowe Vision

=== Former Rowe Productions artists ===
- Antestor (active)
- Antidemon (active, signed to Vision of God Records)
- Biogenesis (active)
- Cry Mercy (disbanded)
- Cybergrind (disbanded, changed name to Martyrs Shrine)
- Desolate Eternity (disbanded)
- DieVersion (disbanded)
- Disparity (disbanded)
- Embodiment 12:14 (disbanded)
- Ethereal Scourge (disbanded)
- Extol (active)
- Fearscape (on hiatus)
- Gnashing of Teeth (disbanded)
- Grave Forsaken (active)
- Groms (disbanded)
- Horde (disbanded)
- Ignite (active, changed name to Draxsen)
- Lament (active)
- LightForce (changed name to Mortification)
- Light Hammer (disbanded)
- Mental Impact (disbanded)
- Metanoia (disbanded)
- Psycoma (disbanded)
- Rageflower (disbanded)
- Sanhedrin (disbanded)
- Scourged Flesh (active)
- Screams of Chaos (disbanded)
- Stauros (active)
- Teramaze (active)
- Ultimatum (active)
- Virgin Black (on hiatus)
- Völlig Heilig (active, changed name to Belica)
- Vomitorial Corpulence (disbanded)
- Vomoth (disbanded)

In the beginning of the label they also released many Compilations that included bands of the label.

== Discography ==
Mortification

Studio albums

- Mortification (1991)
- Scrolls of the Megilloth (1992)
- Post Momentary Affliction (1993)
- Blood World (1994)
- Primitive Rhythm Machine (1995)
- EnVision EvAngelene (1996)
- Triumph of Mercy (1998)
- Hammer of God (1999)
- The Silver Cord is Severed (2001)
- Relentless (2002)
- Brain Cleaner (2004)
- Erasing the Goblin (2006)
- The Evil Addiction Destroying Machine (2009)
- Realm of the Skelataur (2015)

Demo albums

- Break the Curse (1990)

EPs

- Scribe of the Pentateuch (2012)

Live albums

- Live Planetarium (1993)
- Noah Sat Down and Listened to the Mortification Live EP While Having a Coffee (1996, EP)
- Live Without Fear (1996)
- 10 Years Live Not Dead (2000)
- Live Humanitarian (2006)

Compilation albums

- The Best of Five Years (1996)
- Ten Years 1990 - 2000 Power, Pain, and Passion (2002)
- Twenty Years in the Underground (2010)

Bootlegs

- Australia Live (1992)
- Distarnished Priest (1995)
- Live Planetarium 2 (1995)
- Triumph of Mercy (1998)
- Conquer The Stump (2003)
- Total Thrashing Death (2004)

Wonrowe Vision

Studio albums

- Mission Invincible (2010)
- Pictures of the Past Present and Future (2013)
- 2 Headed Monster (2015)

Guest performance

- "Tion" on Released Upon the Earth by Vengeance Rising (1992)
- "Microscopic View of a Telescopic Realm" on the album of the same name by Tourniquet (2000)
- Destined for Ascension by Grave Forsaken (2008)

Production

- Apocalypsenow by Antidemon (2012; Producer)
- Judgement & Restoration by Ethereal Scourge (1997; Producer)
- Tears of a Leper by Lament (1997; Executive Producer)
- In Darkness or in Light by Metanoia (1995; Executive Producer)

== Bibliography ==
- Metal Missionary: The Steve Rowe Story (18 December 2014; VC Media)
