= Mortification (album) =

Studio album by Mortification
- Released: 12 October 1991
- Recorded: 1991
- Studios: Power Plant Studio in Carlton, Melbourne, Australia
- Genres: Christian metal; death metal; thrash metal; grindcore
- Length: 38:01
- Labels: Intense, Nuclear Blast
- Producer: Roger Martinez

Mortification chronology
Break the Curse (1990)	Mortification (1991)	Scrolls of the Megilloth (1992)

Mortification is the debut studio album by Australian Christian death metal band Mortification. It was released on 12 October 1991. This album leans more towards death metal than the band's demo album Break the Curse, but retains thrash metal elements. Five songs from the demo album were re-recorded for Mortification. In 2002, The Billboard Guide to Contemporary Christian Music described the album's sound as "punk-meets-metal grind-core". A bundle containing Mortification and Scrolls of the Megilloth was released on KMG Records in 1998 and on Rowe Productions in 2015, with the latter being exclusively on cassette. Soundmass Records re-released the album with five bonus tracks in 2020, and again in 2022 with new remastering and nine bonus tracks recorded at Q.U.T. Campus Club in Brisbane, Queensland, Australia on 27 September 1991.

Although not as popular as its 1992 follow-up album Scrolls of the Megilloth, Mortification became reputive in both Christian and secular metal scenes for its remarkably brutal output.

Andrew Tompkins, from the Australian Christian metal band Paramaecium, and Derek Sean and Roger Martinez, from the American Christian metal band Vengeance Rising, were additional musicians on the album, with Sean contributing additional lead guitar and both Martinez and Tompkins contributing additional backing vocals; Martinez was also the producer and one of the two mixers on the album, the other being Gil Morales.

== Songs ==
There are two short grindcore songs: "Turn" (33 s.) and "The Majestic Infiltration of Order" (1:07); the latter is commonly known as "God Rulz" because those are the only lyrics in the song and is still often played at the band's concerts. "The Majestic Infiltration of Order" was later re-recorded as "God Rulz" for Hammer of God, Mortification's eighth studio album, in 1999. Music videos were shot for "Turn," "Until the End," "The Destroyer Beholds," and "The Majestic Infiltration of Order" by film maker Neil Johnson; these videos were released on the video compilation Grind Planets. The songs "The Destroyer Beholds" and "The Majestic Infiltration of Order" were originally titled "Infectious Growth" and "God Rulz".

== Artwork ==
Jayson Sherlock's original cover art (seen above, nicknamed the "gnarly cover") was censored by some Christian bookstores; the label shipped them a version with an alternate album cover solely containing the band's logo. The 2020 reissue contains both album covers.

== Track listing ==
All tracks are written by Mortification.

No.	Title	Lyrics	Music	Length
1.	"Until the End"	Michael Carlisle	Carlisle	3:47
2.	"Brutal Warfare^{[a]}"	Steve Rowe	Jayson Sherlock; Rowe	3:57
3.	"Bathed in Blood"	Sherlock	Sherlock	4:31
4.	"Satan's Doom"	Sherlock	Sherlock	6:05
5.	"Turn^{[a]}"	Sherlock	Sherlock	0:33
6.	"No Return"	Sherlock	Sherlock	2:42
7.	"Break the Curse^{[a]}"	Rowe	Rowe	2:43
8.	"New Awakening"	Carlisle	Carlisle	5:04
9.	"The Destroyer Beholds^{1}"	Rowe	Rowe	3:19
10.	"Journey of Reconciliation^{[a]}^{1}"	Sherlock; Rowe	Sherlock	4:13
11.	"The Majestic Infiltration of Order^{[a]}^{[b]}"	Rowe	Rowe	1:07
Total length:				38:01

^{a} Songs re-recorded from Mortification's Break the Curse demo album
^{b} Re-recorded as "God Rulz" on Hammer of God (1999)

2020 reissue bonus tracks
No.	Title	Length
12.	"Until the End" (Live 1992)	3:36
13.	"Brutal Warfare" (Live 1992)	3:57
14.	"Satan's Doom" (Live 1992)	6:09
15.	"Journey of Reconciliation" (Live 1992)	4:29
16.	"Bathed in Blood^{2}" (Live 1991)	4:22
Total length:		60:34

"Live 1991" (2022 reissue bonus tracks)
No.	Title	Length
11.	"Searching" (Live 1991)	3:59
12.	"Impulsation" (Live 1991)	4:16
13.	"Break the Curse" (Live 1991)	2:45
14.	"Bathed in Blood^{2}" (Live 1991)	4:18
15.	"Blood Sacrifice" (Live 1991)	3:30
16.	"Steve Rowe Talks" (Live 1991)	1:26
17.	"God Rulz" (Live 1991)	1:09
18.	"Turn" (Live 1991)	0:36
19.	"Until the End" (Live 1991)	3:44
Total length:		63:48

== Personnel ==
Mortification

- Steve Rowe – lead vocals, bass guitar
- Michael Carlisle – lead guitar, rhythm guitar, backing vocals
- Jayson Sherlock – drums, backing vocals

Additional musicians

- Derek Sean (Vengeance Rising) – additional lead guitar
- Andrew Tompkins (Paramaecium), Roger Martinez (Vengeance Rising) – additional backing vocals

Production

- Roger Martinez – producer, mixing
- Gil Morales – mixing, mix engineer at Pakaderm West in Los Alamitos, California
- Mal Dennis – tracking engineer at Power Plant Studio in Carlton, Melbourne, Australia

Additional personnel

- Joe Potter – design
- Steve More, Andrew "Surfie" Stuivenberg – photography
- Ed McTaggart – art direction
- Jayson Sherlock – Mortification logo and cover artwork
- Scott Waters (Ultimatum) – design and layout (2020 and 2022 versions), liner notes (2020 version)
- Paul D. Clifford – remastering at PCP Studios in Australia (2022 version)

== Notes ==
^{1.} "The Destroyer Beholds" and "Journey of Reconciliation" are both on the same track (track 9) on the 2022 reissue.

^{2.} "Bathed in Blood (Live 1991)" is an identical recording on both the 2020 and 2022 reissues.
