= Ultimatum (American band) =

American christianthrash metal band

- Origin: Albuquerque, New Mexico, U.S.
- Genres: Christian metal, thrash metal, speed metal, heavy metal
- Years active: 1992–present
- Labels: Retroactive, Massacre/Gutter, Rowe, Juke Box Media
- Members: Scott Waters; Robert Gutierrez; Sean Griego; Rob Whitlock; Alan Tuma
- Past members: Steve Trujillo; Tom Michaels; Augustine Ortiz; Greg Dingess; Mike Lynch; Justin Frear
- Website: ultimatum.net

Ultimatum is an American thrash metal band from Albuquerque, New Mexico.

== History ==
Ultimatum was formed in 1992 in Albuquerque, New Mexico by Robert Gutierrez, John Carroll, and Greg Dingess. The band's name comes from the ultimatum given in Joshua 24:15 which states, "But if serving the Lord seems undesirable to you, then choose for yourselves this day whom you will serve." Gutierrez's former Angelic Force guitar player, Steve Trujillo, joined soon after. Vocalist Scott Waters joined the band in January 1993. Their first public performance was at the Sonshine Festival in Albuquerque, NM in 1993.

From 1992-1995, the band performed regularly locally and recorded three demos, Fatal Delay (1993), Symphonic Extremities by Ultimatum (1994), and Symphonic Extremities (1995). The latter two were combined and released on CD by indie label Juke Box Media, and on CD with a new song mixed by Whitecross guitarist Rex Carroll.

Drummer Sean Griego joined the band in 1995. His more aggressive style helped the band morph from traditional heavy metal to speed and thrash metal. That year, the band opened for Mortification on their Blood World tour. Mortification bassist Steve Rowe liked the band and purchased their demo tapes to sell through his indie distribution company, Rowe Productions. In 1996, the band signed a three-album contract with Rowe. They released Puppet of Destruction in 1998, which was distributed by Diamante Music Group in the US.

Puppet of Destruction received mixed reviews. Within a year, the same line-up recorded their second album for Rowe Productions, Mechanics of Perilous Times. The album was scheduled for release in early 2000 on Rowe. During this time, the band released two songs for Dwell records, including a cover of Testament's "Sins of Omission". Due to the success of the Testament cover, Massacre Records approached Ultimatum. Rowe Productions allowed the band to release the album on their new label in March 2001.

Bassist Tom Micheals left Ultimatum in 2001, following the band's performance at the second Stryper Expo in Anaheim, CA. Rob Whitlock became their new bassist.

The band began recording demos in 2004 to shop to record labels. Retroactive Records signed the band. In the meantime, a four-song demo was released on CD with a couple of bonus tracks as the 'Til the End EP on Roxx Productions (2006). It was re-released in 2016 on Stone Groove Records.

In 2006, guitarist Steve Trujillo left the band and was replaced with Augustine Ortiz.

Into the Pit was recorded with producer Ysidro Garcia at Sight 16 Studios. During the recording, Sean Griego was replaced with former Moshketeers drummer Alan Tuma. Tuma recorded drums on four of the album's eleven tracks. Into the Pit was released by Retroactive Records on October 30, 2007 to positive reviews.

In 2007, Retroactive reissued Symphonic Extremities and Mechanics of Perilous Times, remastered and containing bonus tracks.

In 2008 Ultimatum recorded a covers album featuring songs that were at least partially chosen by fan suggestions on the band's discussion board. Lex Metalis was released on Retroactive Records on July 21, 2009.

In 2009, Puppet of Destruction was remastered and re-released on Roxx Records with bonus tracks. A limited edition run of 100 copies were pressed as a two-CD set with the 1993 Fatal Delay demo on the bonus disc.

Their sound has been compared to Exodus and Metal Church. The singles "World of Sin" from their 1995 debut album Symphonic Extremities and "Never" from their second studio 1998 album Puppet of Destruction reached the top ten on the Pure Rock Report's chart. The band has continued to tour up to the present day.

== Discography ==
'Demos'

- Fatal Delay (1993)
- Symphonic Extremities by Ultimatum (1994)
- Symphonic Extremities (1995)
- Never (1996)

'Studio albums'

- Symphonic Extremities (1995) - Juke Box Media
- Puppet of Destruction (1998) - Rowe Productions
- The Mechanics of Perilous Times... (2001) - Gutter Records, an imprint of Massacre Records
- Into the Pit (2007) - Retroactive Records
- Lex Metalis (2009) - Retroactive Records

'Compilations'

- Heart of Metal - 20 Years of Ultimatum (2012) - Roxx

'EPs

- Til' the End (2006) - Roxx

== Members ==
Current line up

- Scott Waters – vocals (1993–present)
- Robert Gutierrez – guitar (1992–present)
- Rob Whitlock – bass (2002–present)
- Alan Tuma – drums (2007–present)

Former members

- Steve Trujillo – guitar (1992–2006)
- Mike Lynch – drums (1993–1997)
- Greg Dingess – bass (1993–1995)
- Joey Anaya – bass (1994–1995)
- Tom Michaels – bass (1995–2002)
- Sean Griego – drums (1997–2006)
- Augustine Ortiz – guitar (2006)
- Justin Frear – guitar (2008; died 2020)
- Fabian Aguilar – guitar (2010–2011)
