= Mortification (band) =

Australian Christian metal band

- Origin: Moorabbin, Victoria, Australia
- Genres: Death metal; Christian death metal; thrash metal; groove metal; Christian metal
- Years active: 1990–2016; 2026–present
- Labels: Intense, Nuclear Blast, Rowe
- Spinoff of: Lightforce
- Members: Lincoln Bowen; Michael Jelinic; Luke Renno
- Past members: Steve Rowe; Andrew Esnouf; Jayson Sherlock; Phil Gibson; Keith Bannister; Bill Rice; Dave Kilgallon; Mike Forsberg; Dean Conroy; Cameron Hall; Michael Carlisle; Jeff Lewis; Damien Percy; George Ochoa; Adam Zaffarese; Johnny Vasquez
- Website: roweproductions.com

Mortification are an Australian Christian death metal band formed in 1987 as a heavy metal group, Lightforce, by bassist/singer Steve Rowe. By 1990, in the Melbourne suburb of Moorabbin, they renamed to Mortification with the line-up of Rowe, guitarist Michael Carlisle, and drummer Jayson Sherlock. Mortification have released fourteen studio albums, three compilation albums, three extended plays, six live discs, one demo album, one box set, and several videos on major record labels such as Nuclear Blast. As one of the earliest internationally successful Australian Christian death metal bands, they inspired later similar groups.

During the early 1990s, Mortification played death and thrash metal. After Sherlock's departure, Mortification experimented with groove metal, hardcore punk and power metal. They achieved commercial success with Blood World in 1994, and received critical acclaim for 1996's EnVision EvAngelene. Despite the lack of subsequent commercial success or mainstream critical recognition, "the band, in spite of their extreme sound, are some kind of superstars in the 'White Metal' scene", and have been described as "a legend in the death metal scene."

In late 1996, Rowe was diagnosed with acute lymphatic leukemia and took 18 months to recover. Mortification issued their tenth album, Triumph of Mercy, in August 1998, and accompanied it with a North American tour. By August 1999, the band had sold a quarter of a million albums across Europe and the US. They returned to their death/thrash roots for the 2004 album Brain Cleaner.

In 2026, they announced a Scrolls of the Megilloth 35th anniversary tour in Latin America, with the band playing 10 dates in February of 2027. The announced line-up consisted of drummer Sherlock, guitarists Bowen and Jelinic, and singer/bassist Luke Renno of Crimson Thorn. Sherlock announced that, due to health reasons, he was dropping out of the tour.

== History ==
=== Original line-up ===
In 1987, bass guitarist and vocalist Steve Rowe formed Australian power metal band LightForce with guitarist Murray Adams, singer Steve Johnson, and drummer Errol Willenberg. The group played on the local metal scene. They signed with United States label Pure Metal Records to release their debut album, Mystical Thieves, in May 1989. They supported US Christian glam band Stryper on their 1989 Australian tour. In 1990, Rowe was determined to play heavy Christian music. Drummer Jayson Sherlock and guitarist Cameron Hall joined him to become LightForce and record the demo Break the Curse. The group shifted towards thrash metal with a death metal influence. When Michael Carlisle replaced Hall, they renamed to Mortification. According to Rowe, the name comes from the King James Bible, "Mortify therefore the deeds of the flesh." Break the Curse was released in 1991 as Mortification's second album.

"Scrolls of the Megilloth"
Sample of "Scrolls of the Megilloth" by Mortification, from Scrolls of the Megilloth (1992). The album's music garnered the band some attention from the heavy metal underground and, according to AllMusic, contains some of the most frightening vocals ever recorded.

In early 1991, they released their self-titled debut album on US Christian label Intense Records. They changed musical direction again. Many songs were taken from their demo Break the Curse, but the band downtuned their guitars, making the songs heavier and doomier. As a death metal vocalist, Rowe presented his "Grind Baritone vocals of extreme reality" throughout the album. According to AllMusic, the band "sought to provide a positive alternative to traditional death metal acts such as Carcass, Death and Obituary. On the strength of their self-titled 1990 debut, Mortification quickly gained a reputation in their native Australia for being one of the loudest and fastest bands around."

In 1992, the band signed with Nuclear Blast Records in Germany, whose roster included many European death metal groups. Mortification released their third album, Scrolls of the Megilloth, which was successful and is considered a Christian metal classic and a piece of Australian metal history. The line-up played fast death metal with a couple of doom-influenced tracks. According to AllMusic, the album contains "some of the most frightening vocals ever recorded."

Jayson Sherlock played his last concert with the band at the Black Stump Festival '93. The show was released on CD and VHS as Live Planetarium. A US magazine cited the Live Planetarium video as the best live album and video they had seen.

The band released the album Blood World in 1994. They leaned towards modern groove/thrash with classic metal and hardcore punk influences rather than death metal. Rowe shouted rather than growled. Gibson and Carlisle left the band. The combination of extreme styles set Mortification apart as innovators and not imitators, and widened the band's audience. Blood World received positive reviews in America and Europe. Horror Infernal Magazine gave the album 13 out of 13 points.

=== Rowe diagnosed with leukaemia ===
In late 1996, Rowe was diagnosed with acute lymphatic leukemia. He was in remission after 18 months despite a seemingly failed bone marrow transplant. Soon after, Mortification recorded their tenth album, Triumph of Mercy, and released it in August 1998. It was issued by Rowe Productions in the US and Nuclear Blast Germany in Europe. The lyrics focused on the band's experiences of the previous two-years. The album mixed groove and thrash. They followed with a North American tour.

1999 saw the release of Hammer of God, another mix of thrash and groove. The death metal elements faded but the religious message remained. The band's line-up was Rowe with drummer Keith Bannister and guitarist Lincoln Bowen. They undertook another European tour to promote Hammer of God. By August that year, the group had sold a quarter of a million albums across Europe and the US.

In 2000, Mortification released another live album, recorded at Black Stump Festival in 1999, called 10 Years Live Not Dead. It mainly featured material from their newer albums and the new song "Dead Man Walking". Bannister left the band and Adam Zaffarese replaced him.

The new line-up released the album The Silver Cord is Severed in 2000. The band went on its first world tour. The music continued to be thrash and groove. While many fans thought the album was the band's weakest, The Silver Cord is Severed sold well. This was due to the fact that – like Nuclear Blast founder Markus Staiger stated in a newsletter – had become "some kind of superstars in the Christian metal scene".

=== Return to death/thrash roots ===
In early 2008, Polish Metal Mind Productions re-released the band's nine early records.

On 6 June, it was announced that Mortification would record an album in 2009. On 5 August, the band stated that they would record a demo for the new album. On 4 February, Rowe announced that the album The Evil Addiction Destroying Machine was partially completed, and it was released early June. Rowe confused fans by reportedly calling the new musical direction "easy-listening thrash". Rowe noted in a message for The Metal Resource about the reception of The Evil Addiction Destroying Machine, "With all new Mort releases there have been mixed response; pretty black and white. Some Really Like It and some really Don't Like It. But I knew with presenting the band in a reinvented way it was an excitingly dangerous move!"

In 2016, Rowe spoke in an interview about a re-pressing of Post Momentary Affliction on vinyl. He stated that former drummer Jayson Sherlock redesigned the artwork.

=== Scrolls of the Megilloth 35th anniversary tour ===
On 22 April 2026, it was announced the band would tour Latin America in February 2027 to celebrate the 35th anniversary of their second album, Scrolls of the Megilloth. A few weeks following the announcement, Rowe revealed he would not be part of the tour due to complications and slow recovery from a stroke, and would be replaced with Luke Renno of Crimson Thorn. The rest of the lineup includes former members Jayson Sherlock, Lincoln Bowen, and Michael Jelinic. Sherlock dropped out before the tour due to health reasons.

== Reception and legacy ==
Mortification was described by Australian rock music historian, Ian McFarlane in his Encyclopedia of Australian Rock and Pop in 1999: "During the early 1990s, Mortification became internationally known as Australia's foremost Christian-inspired death metal band. Christian death metal: surely a contradiction in terms; but only for the uninitiated. Mortification successfully infused the down-tuned, sledgehammer riffs and gruff vocal style usually associated with the death/thrash metal genre with positive and spiritually uplifting lyric themes."

Records released after Steve Rowe's leukemia have received poor reviews from critics, though they kept selling well. A critic wrote that "The weakest link of current Mortification are the lyrics. They are just somewhat naive and cheesy. On the old albums sinners screamed in pain in the fiery pits of hell, Satan was slaughtered; the rhetoric's fit the spirit of the brutal music better. Apparently the fatherhood and going through the disease has calmed Rowe down too much, although on the early records the previous members Jayson Sherlock and Mick Carlisle wrote a lot of the lyrics." The different singing style Rowe did for many years after Post Momentary Affliction was another target for criticism, being called "poor screaming".

According to Australian writers Gary Garson and Peter Schultz, Mortification is the world's most successful Christian extreme metal band. Their first three albums are respected efforts of death metal. Blood World was a commercial hit and EnVision EvAngelene gained some respect for its music. During the tour for Blood World they played with Napalm Death, Sick of It All and Entombed for audiences consisting of thousands of people, and sold more merchandise than the other bands in the venues.

In Raised by Wolves, author John J. Thompson pointed out that upon forming Mortification, Rowe "suddenly had one of the most credible Christian death metal bands in the world on his hands." Thompson defined Mortification as "one of the heaviest bands ever to hit the Christian scene" and described its albums as "a blatantly evangelistic work of shredding death metal."

Discussing the social aspects of the extreme metal scene, author Keith Kahn-Harris wrote that overt Christian bands like Mortification are often "strongly criticized if their commitment to music is perceived to be subordinate to their commitment to politics." Kahn-Harris observed that "with a very few exceptions, overt Christian bands tend to be confined to their own, largely autonomous scenes." But he acknowledges that "music and scene can never be detached from flows of power and capital and hence a non-political scene is an impossibility.... The scene is enmeshed in relations of power and capital, despite its relative autonomy as a field."

Vice stated the opinion that the band were underrated.

== Band members ==
Current members

- Lincoln Bowen – rhythm and lead guitars, backing vocals (1996–2001, 2011–2016, 2026–present)
- Michael Jelinic – lead and rhythm guitars (2002–2011, 2026–present)
- Luke Renno – vocals, bass (2026–present)

Former members

- Steve Rowe – vocals, bass (1990–2016)
- Jayson Sherlock – drums, backing vocals (1990–1993, 2026)
- Cameron Hall – rhythm guitars (1990)
- Michael Carlisle – lead guitars, backing vocals (1991–1994)
- Phil Curtis–Gibson – drums (1993–1994)
- George Ochoa – rhythm guitars, keyboards (1994–1996)
- Jason Campbell – rhythm guitars, vocals (1995)
- Dave Kellogg – lead guitars (1995)
- Josh Rivero – guitar (1995)
- Bill Rice – drums (1995)
- Keith Bannister – drums, backing vocals (1996–1999)
- Adam Zaffarese – drums (2000–2003, 2008–2011)
- Jeff Lewis – rhythm guitars (2002)
- Mike Forsberg – drums (2003–2005)
- Damien Percy – drums (2005–2008) (died 2018)
- Dave Kilgallon – drums (2008)
- Troy Dixon – guitars (2011)
- Andrew Esnouf – drums (2011–2016)

Touring musicians

- Johnny Vasquez – drums (1993)

Session musicians

- Derek Sean – lead guitars (1991)

Timeline

== Discography ==
Mortification discography
- Studio albums: 14
- Extended plays: 3
- Live albums: 6
- Compilation albums: 3
- Demo albums: 1
- Box sets: 1

Studio albums

- Mortification (1991)
- Scrolls of the Megilloth (1992)
- Post Momentary Affliction (1993)
- Blood World (1994)
- Primitive Rhythm Machine (1995)
- EnVision EvAngelene (1996)
- Triumph of Mercy (1998)
- Hammer of God (1999)
- The Silver Cord is Severed (2001)
- Relentless (2002)
- Brain Cleaner (2004)
- Erasing the Goblin (2006)
- The Evil Addiction Destroying Machine (2009)
- Realm of the Skelataur (2015)

Demo albums

- Break the Curse (1990)

EPs

- Scribe of the Pentateuch (2012)
- Ancient Prophecy/Overseer (2017)

Live albums

- Live Planetarium (1993)
- Live Without Fear (1996)
- Noah Sat Down and Listened to the Mortification Live E.P. While Having a Coffee (1996, EP)
- 10 Years Live Not Dead (2000)
- Live Humanitarian (2006)
- Live 1996 (2020)

Compilation albums

- The Best of Five Years (1996)
- Ten Years 1990–2000 Power, Pain, and Passion (2002)
- Twenty Years in the Underground (2010)

Box sets

- The Intense Years: 30th Anniversary Box Set (2020)

Bootlegs

- Australia Live (1992)
- Distarnished Priest (1995)
- Live Planetarium 2 (1995)
- Triumph of Mercy (1998)
- Conquer The Stump (2003)
- Total Thrashing Death (2004)

Other appearances

- Death Is Just The Beginning Vol. 2 (1993)

Scrolls of the Megilloth – Mortification (previously unreleased)

- Nuclear Blast Presents! Summer Blast 1994
- Hot Metal V: Screaming Truth

Track 7- An interview with Mortification
Track 8- Distarnish Priest

- Godspeed: Australian Metal Compilation- Time Crusaders (Studio Demo Version)
- Tourniquet/Mortification collector's edition CD single

Track 9- Your Life
Track 10- J.G.S.H.
Track 11- Love Song
Track 12- A Short Interview with Steve Rowe on the History of Mortification

Videos

- Metal Missionaries (1991, video)
- Grind Planets (1993, video, 55 minutes)
- The History of Mortification (1994, video)
- Live Planetarium (1994, video, 60 minutes)
- Envision (1996, video, 60 minutes)
- Conquer The World (2002, DVD, 95 minutes)
- Grind Planets Reissue (2005, DVD, 89 minutes)
- Live Planetarium (2006, DVD, 90 minutes)
