= In the Deep (album) =

In The Deep

Studio album by Maria Solheim
- Released: 2012-10-12
- Length: 37:27
- Label: Universal Music Group
- Producer: Nick Terry

Maria Solheim chronology
Will There Be Spring (2006)	In The Deep (2012)

In The Deep is an album by Norwegian singer-songwriter Maria Solheim released October 12, 2012 by Universal Music Group.

== Background ==
On this fifth solo album release, Solheim show her considerable abilities. In the studio sessions she was joined by Henry Olsen (Primal Scream, Nico, The Velvet Underground, John Cale and others), Emil Nikolaisen (Serena Maneesh), among other stellar musicians, resulting in a record with songs spanning from quiet, simple guitar-based tunes, through rock, and all the way to pop. This is an album you even can dance to.

Professional ratings
Review scores
Source	Rating
Dagbladet	4/6 stars

== Reception ==
The reviewer Julia Pettersen of the Norwegian newspaper Dagbladet, awarded the album dice 4.

== Track listing ==
(All songs written by Maria Solheim)

1. "Sally Song" (4:06)
2. "Run Away" (3:06)
3. "When Grace Left Town" (3:29)
4. "Home Is Where the Heart Is" (3:15)
5. "Song of Forgotten Songs" (2:31)
6. "The Break Up" (3:25)
7. "In the Deep" (3:35)
8. "Can I See You Again" (3:10)
9. "Dance with Me" (3:04)
10. "Be Well" (4:32)
11. "The Hill" (2:56)

== Musicians ==
- Emil Nikolaisen – acoustic guitar, drums, backing vocals
- Henry Olsen – guitars, bass, keyboards
- Ådne Meisfjord – keyboards
- Torstein Lofthus – drums (#1)
- Audun Haugepass – piano (#1)
- Kjetil Steensnæs – guitars, pedalsteel & acoustic jumbo guitar (#1)
- Mari Sandvær Kreken – backing vocals (#1)
- Alan Brey – Russian bass synth, mellotron (#2)
- Nick Terry – hi guitar (#2), bass (#3), noises (#7)
- Håvard Krogedal – cello (#3)
- Arnulf Lindner – cello (#6)
- Maria Solheim – vocals, guitar, backing vocals, piano

== Notes ==
- Produced by Nick Terry
