= Drain Cosmetics =

Album by Serena-Maneesh

EP by Serena Maneesh
- Released: June 12, 2006 (United Kingdom)
- Label: Playlouder Recordings
- Producer: Emil Nikolaisen

Serena Maneesh chronology
Serena Maneesh (2005/2006)	Drain Cosmetics (2006)

"Drain Cosmetics" is the first enhanced single by Norwegian band Serena Maneesh.

== ECD Track listing ==
1. Drain Cosmetics – 3:41
2. Drain Cosmetics (Deadverse Remix) (n:a)
3. Don't Come Down Here (Odd's NDSAM Remix) (n:a)
4. Sapphire Eyes (Serena-Maneesh Refix) – 3:12
5. Drain Cosmetics (promo video) – 3:17 Enhanced

== 7" Track listing ==
1. Drain Cosmetics – 3:41
2. Sapphire Eyes (Serena-Maneesh Refix) – 3:12

== 12" Track listing ==
1. Drain Cosmetics (Deadverse Remix) (n:a)
2. Don't Come Down Here (Odd's NDSAM Remix) (n:a)

== Other release formats ==
- The three original songs are available on the Serena-Maneesh album, released in audio CD and vinyl LP, in 2005 and re-released internationally in 2006.
- The promo video for "Drain Cosmetics" was released as a digital single Podcast in PlayLouder's site on February 12, 2006.

== Media links ==
- Sapphire Eyes (Refix) legal MP3 (Broken Link)
- Drain Cosmetics promo video Hi-Fi QuickTime for Win/Mac (Broken Link)
