= The Next Life =

The Next Life may refer to:

Music

- The Next Life (EP), by Girls Names, with remixes from their album The New Life, 2013
- Next Life (band), a Norwegian progressive, electronic group
- "The Next Life", a song by Suede from Suede, 1993
- "The Next Life", a song by Tom Cochrane & Red Rider from The Symphony Sessions, 1989

Other media

- The Next Life (audio drama), a 2004 Doctor Who audio play
- "The Next Life" (The Guardian), a television episode
- Next Life, a 2007 video game
- The Next Life, a 2012 poetry book by Pat Boran
