= Steensnæs =

Steensnæs is a Norwegian surname. Notable people with the surname include:

- Einar Steensnæs (born 1942), Norwegian politician
- Kjetil Steensnæs (born 1976), Norwegian musician
