= Rosa Faenskap =

Norwegian black metal band

- Logo

Background information
- Origin: Oslo, Norway
- Genres: Black metal; Hardcore punk
- Years active: 2021-present
- Label: Fysisk Format
- Members: Håvard Solli; Emil Vestre; Anders Jansvik
- Website: rosafaenskap.com

Rosa Faenskap is a Norwegian black metal band from Oslo.

== History ==
The band originated in 2021, at the anarchist social centre Blitz House in Oslo. The members at the time all studied musicology at the University of Oslo.

=== Jeg blir til deg (2023) ===
The band released their debut album, Jeg blir til deg, on 3 November 2023 on Fysisk Format. The album combined the genres black metal, hardcore punk, post-metal and shoegaze.

The album was nominated for the 2023 Subjektprisen Musical Release Of The Year, an award hosted by the Norwegian website Subjekt. Following this, Rosa Faenskap opted out of the nomination, stating that they didn't want legitimize Subjekt as a cultural newspaper. The band also wrote a response criticising the website's right-wing, transphobic and racist politics, and they discouraged people from voting for them in the nomination.

=== Ingenting Forblir (2026) ===
The band released a single for their second studio album on 12 February 2026. The single, called Jeg våkner snart, is themed around how the growth of fascism affects them personally. Rosa Faenskap released their second album, Ingenting Forblir on 6 March 2026. The album received positive feedback from critics.

== Genre and themes ==
Rosa Faenskap describe their genre as both black metal and hardcore punk.

The band often expresses opposition towards homophobia, transphobia, capitalism, patriarchy and fascism, both in their lyrics and in their public statements. Vestre have also showed opposition against gender norms, taking a disliking to the term "cross-dressing", saying that it implies dressing as the opposite gender is "crossing into some other territory that doesn't belong to me".

== Members ==
Current Members

- Håvard Solli – Bass and lead vocals
- Emil Vestre – Guitar and backing vocals
- Anders Jansvik – Drums

== Discography ==
EPs and singles

- "Aldri" (2022)
- "Skjør" (2023)
- "Paradis" (2023)
- Livredd EP (2023)
- "Klarhet i kaos" (2025)
- "Bygg til himmelen" (2025)
- "Jeg våkner snart" (2026)

Albums

- Jeg blir til deg (2023)
- Ingenting Forblir (2026)
