= Human Factors =

Human Factors or Human Factor may refer to:

- Engineering psychology, also known as Human Factors Engineering or Human Factors Psychology
- Human factors, or ergonomics, the application of psychological and physiological principles to the engineering and design of products, processes, and systems
- Human Factors (journal), publishing scientific studies in ergonomics
- Human Factors (film), a 2021 German-Italian-Danish drama
- Human Factor (TV series), an Armenian weekday news program

== See also ==
- The Human Factor (disambiguation)
- Human Error (disambiguation)
