= Årabrot =

Norwegian rock band

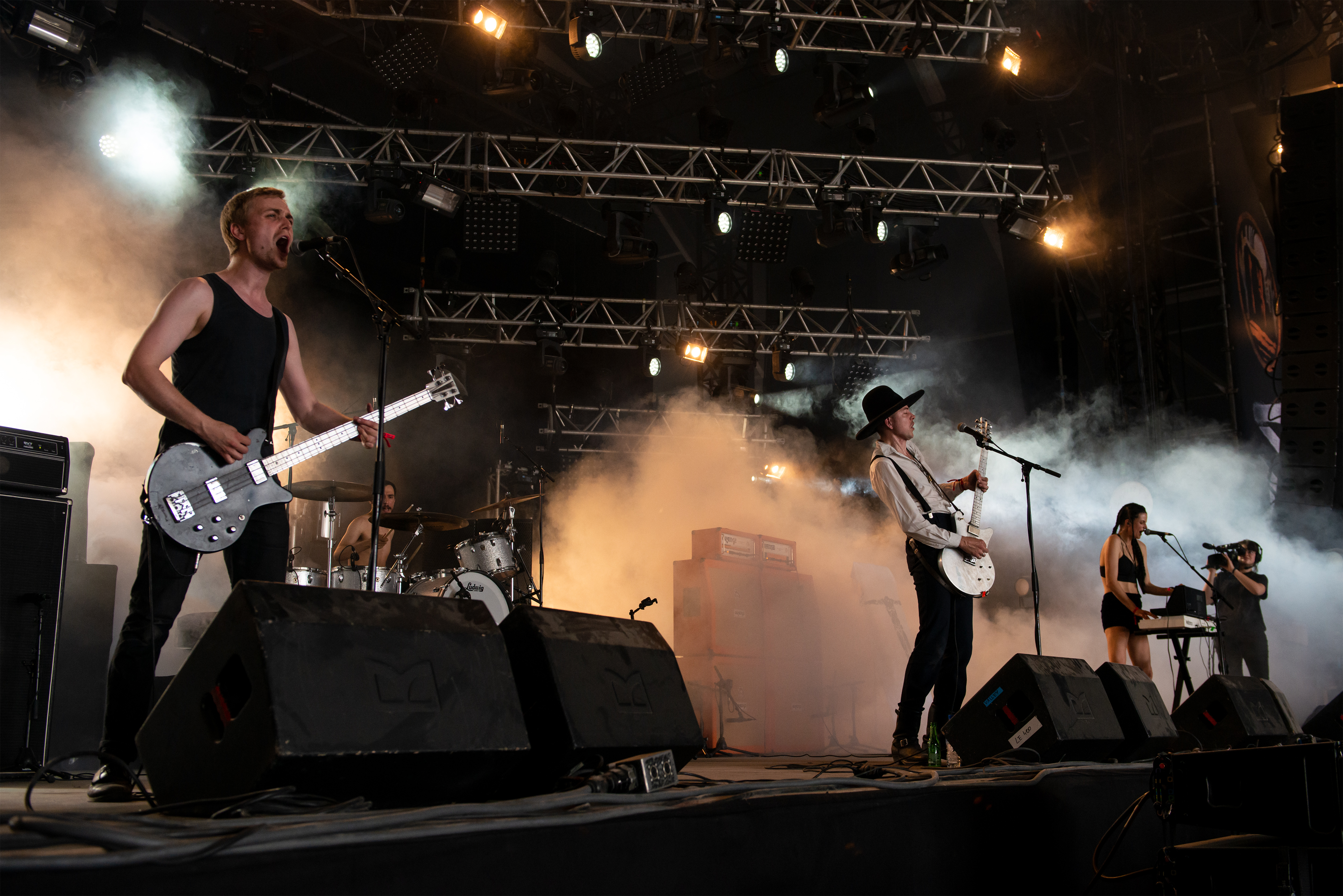
- Årabrot, Hellfest 2019.

Background information
- Also known as: Arabrot
- Origin: Haugesund, Norway
- Genres: Noise-rock, sludge metal, doom metal, post-punk,
- Years active: 2001–present
- Label: Fysisk Format
- Spinoffs: Nernes Skagen
- Members: Kjetil Nernes
- Past members: Vidar Evensen (2001-2013); Kristian Kallevik (2001-2003); Jon Øvstedal (2001-2010)
- Website: www.arabrot.com

Årabrot is a Norwegian noise-rock band established in 2001, originally from Haugesund, but with a current creative base in Djura and the Oslo-based record label Fysisk Format.

== Name ==
The band is named after a garbage dump in Haugesund, Norway. Etymologically, the name may refer to the place where the rivers or currents meet.

== History ==
Since starting out in 2001, Årabrot's main core has been Kjetil Nernes (songwriter, guitar and vocals), Vidar Evensen (drums and visuals) and Jon Øvstedal (bass), and in recent years noise artist Stian Skagen (electronics) has been a regular on-and-off member of the band. They have also collaborated with producers such as Billy Anderson (Melvins, Neurosis), Emil Nikolaisen (Serena-Maneesh, Maribel) and Steve Albini (Nirvana, Big Black, High on Fire). Their first three albums were released on Norway Rat Records before they signed to their current home Fysisk Format with the I Rove EP.

In 2009 they were nominated in the metal category of the Norwegian award Spellemannprisen for the release The Brother Seed, which was produced by well-known musician and producer Steve Albini. In the years following this album, Arabrot spent time playing at unorthodox venues. For instance, they did live scores at silent film showings ("Faust" from 1926 in Trondheim, "Häxan" from 1922 at Øyafestivalen, "The Cabinet of Dr. Caligari" from 1920 and "Die Nibelungen" from 1924 at Verdensteatret in Tromsø) and did commissioned work for the Henie Onstad Kunstsenter.

Amidst these activities, Arabrot produced the exploratory EPs AbsoluteNegativism, I Rove and Mæsscr, two albums under the Nernes Skagen moniker, as well as two full-length albums: The Billy Anderson-produced double album REVENGE and Solar Anus, again featuring Steve Albini as a producer. For Solar Anus, they were nominated and subsequently won Spellemannprisen in the metal category. This album saw wide international praise, and was described by Drowned in Sound as "...ferocious, funny, colossal, guttural, hopeful and terrifying. It’s a tidal wave of noise from few hands. Like its title, it’s a contradiction, a dichotomy, a triumph. It shouldn’t work, but it does, infinitely well. It’s art from the lowest of sods. It’s a fucking triumph."

The Norwegian movie director Fredrik S. Hana made a music video to the track "Solaranus" which was premiered on The Quietus February 20, 2012.

Årabrot's 2012 EP Mæsscr was produced by Serena Maneesh's Emil Nikolaisen and contains covers of Death in June and Lee Hazlewood, as well as two new tracks. The release was premiered by The Quietus on August 14, 2012.

In 2013, original member Vidar Evensen left the band. The band changed their name to the current Arabrot, and released their self-titled sixth album in August 2013 to 8/10's in NME, Rock Sound, Metal Hammer and Terrorizer. The artwork was done by Johannes Høie.

Årabrot has a side project called Nernes Skagen, consisting of Årabrot-singer Kjetil Nernes and concept.virus and Årabrot-collaborator Stian Skagen. The duo has released two albums on Fysisk Format, Ad Undas (2009) and Confession (2011). The band says that they completed a nine-day tour after vocalist Nernes blew his lung the first show, and that Nernes’ riff arm has steel implants after being manhandled by police and dog.

== Artistic influences ==
Arabrot's lyricism includes macabre renditions of classic works like the Bible and Dante's Inferno and philosophical themes derived from the historical avant-garde. The band also draw inspiration from the existentialism of Albert Camus and Jean-Paul Sartre; the surrealism of Georges Bataille and Comte de Lautréamont; the eroticism of Henry Miller and Marquis de Sade; the romantic writings of Samuel Taylor Coleridge, Edgar Allan Poe and Thomas de Quincey; mystic thinkers such as Aleister Crowley and Jorge Luis Borges, oppositionals like Federico García Lorca and the Norwegian contrarian Jens Bjørneboe.

Musically, the band cite Death in June, Melvins, Lee Hazlewood, The Birthday Party and Swans as their main sources of inspiration.

== Band members ==
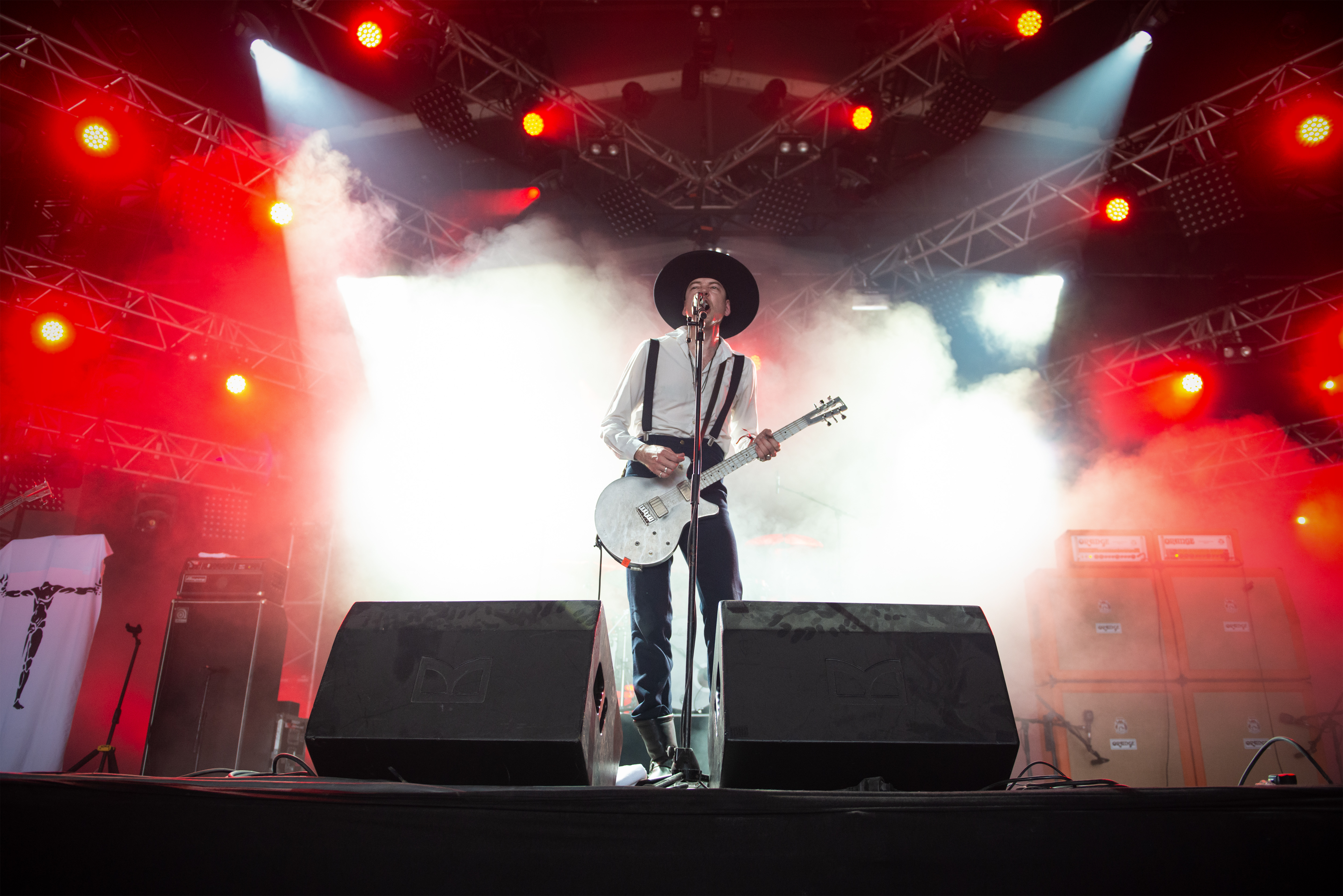
Kjetil Nernes with Årabrot in Hellfest 2019.

- K:N (Kjetil Nernes): guitar, vocals (2001-)

=== Previous members ===
- Sofus K (Kristian Kallevik): bass (2001-2003)
- Deadly Nightshade (Jon Øvstedal): bass, keyboard, guitar (2001-2010)
- Marakel (Vidar Evensen): percussion (2001-2013)
- Magnus Nymo: drums

=== Associated members ===
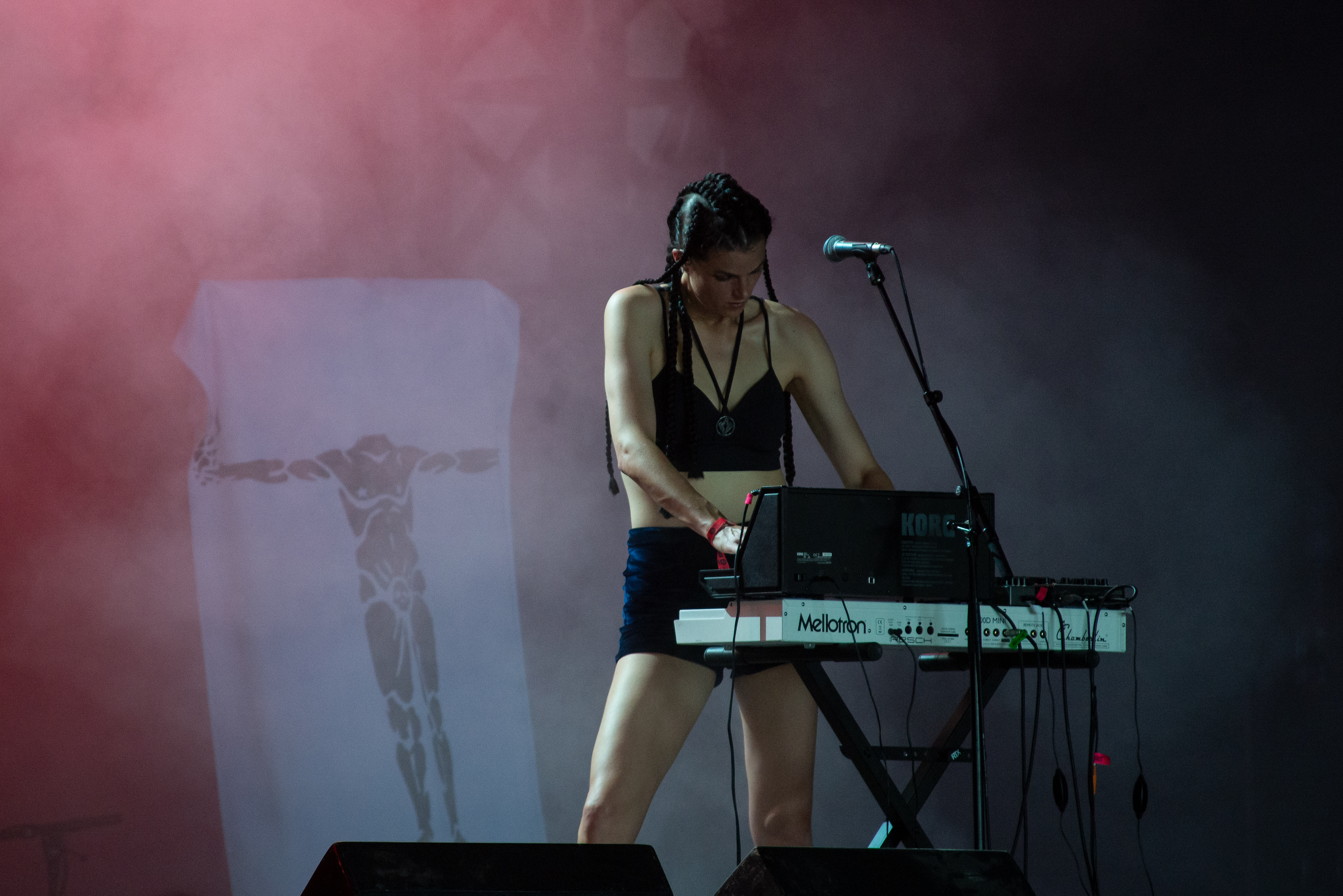
Karin Park with Årabrot in Hellfest 2019.

- Johannes Høie: illustration and artwork (2013-)
- Emil Nikolaisen (from Serena Maneesh): bass live (2010-)
- Karin Park: piano, backing vocals (2013-)
- Magnus Nymo (from FORK, REDD): bass live (2011-)
- Åse Bredeli Røyset (from Deathcrush): bass live (2011)
- Concept.virus (Stian Skagen): electronics (2009-)

== Discography ==
Year	Title	Format	Label
2003	Rogues Gallery	LP	Safe as Milk
2005	Proposing a Pact with Jesus	CD	Norway Rat Records
2006	Rep.Rep	CD, Double LP	Norway Rat Records
2009	The Brother Seed	CD, LP	Norway Rat Records
2009	Absolute Negativism (EP) feat. Concept.virus	CD	Norway Rat Records
2009	I Rove (EP)	CD	Fysisk Format
2010	Revenge	CD, Double LP	Fysisk Format
2011	Solar Anus	CD, LP	Fysisk Format
2012	Mæsscr (EP)	LP	Fysisk Format
2013	Arabrot	CD, MC, LP	Fysisk Format
2014	Murder As Art (EP)	LP	Fysisk Format
2014	I Modi (EP)	LP	Fysisk Format
2015	You Bunch of Idiots (EP)	LP	Fysisk Format
2016	The Gospel	CD, LP	Fysisk Format
2018	Who Do You Love	LP	Pelagic Records
2021	Norwegian Gothic	CD	Pelagic Records
2023	Of Darkness and Light	CD, LP	Pelagic Records
