= The Human Factor =

The Human Factor may refer to:

== Film and television ==
- The Human Factor (1975 film), a thriller
- The Human Factor (1979 film), based on Graham Greene's novel
- The Human Factor (2013 film), an Italian film
- The Human Factor (2019 film), a documentary
- The Human Factor (TV series), a 1992 American medical drama
- "The Human Factor", a 1986 episode of MacGyver (1985 TV series) season 2
- "The Human Factor" (1963 The Outer Limits), a TV episode
- "The Human Factor", a 2002 episode of The Outer Limits (1995 TV series)

== Literature ==
- The Human Factor (novel), by Graham Greene, 1978
- The Human Factor: Revolutionizing the Way We Live with Technology, a 2004 nonfiction book by Kim Vicente
- The Human Factor: Inside the CIA's Dysfunctional Intelligence Culture, a 2008 nonfiction book by Ishmael Jones

== Other uses ==
- The Human Factor (album), by Metal Church, 1991
- "The Human Factor", a 1980 song by Music for Pleasure
- "The Human Factor", a 2001 audio drama in the Dalek Empire audio drama series

== See also ==
- Human Factors (disambiguation)
- Human Error (disambiguation)
- Ergonomics, or human factors
