= Frail (Maria Solheim album) =

Studio album by Maria Solheim
- Released: 2004
- Recorded: June–October 2003
- Label: Kirkelig Kulturverksted
- Producer: Emil Nikolaisen

Maria Solheim chronology
Behind Closed Doors (2002)	Frail (2004)	Will There Be Spring (2006)

Frail is an album by Norwegian singer-songwriter Maria Solheim released in 2004 by Kirkelig Kulturverksted (FXCD 278).

== Background ==
This is Solheims third solo album release, including a collection of hushed and intense original songs. Here we encounter a more mature artist despite her 22 years of age.

Professional ratings
Review scores
Source	Rating
Verdens Gang	4/6 stars
ABC Nyheter	4/6 stars

== Reception ==
The reviewer Stein Østbø of the Norwegian newspaper Verdens Gang, awarded the album dice 4, reviewer Henriette Westerlund Eriksen of the Norwegian newspaper ABC Nyheter, awarded the album dice 4.

== Track listing ==
(All songs and lyrics by Maria Solheim, arrangements by Emil, Maria and 'the band')

1. Too Many Days
2. The Snow Has Killed
3. Kissing Me
4. Take My Heart Away
5. Mr. Iceman
6. Pain
7. Natural Silence
8. Restless Girl
9. Will You Say
10. Because I'm Dead

== Musicians ==
- David Wallumrød: Fender Rhodes, vocals, Wurlitzer, Hammond
- Torstein Lofthus: drums and percussion
- Tor Egil Kreken: bass, Fender bass
- Kjetil Steensnæs: guitars, pedalsteel
- Carl Andreas Helsvig: Trombone
- Mats Joachim Johnsen: Trumpet

== Notes ==
- Produced by Emil Nikolaisen
- Recorded at Hangaroundsounds by Don Dons in June, August, September and October 2003
- Mixed at Crystal Canyon by Marius Bodin Larsen
- Additional recording at Crystal Canyon by Marius Bodin Larsen and Emil Nikolaisen in October and November 2003
- Mastered at Cutting Room Studios by Björn Engelmann
- Tor Egil uses Demeter amplification
- Cover by Per Olav Walmann
- Photos by Rebecca Borghild Nilsen and Maria Solheim
