= Will There Be Spring =

Studio album by Maria Solheim
- Released: 2006
- Label: Kirkelig Kulturverksted
- Producer: Emil Nikolaisen

Maria Solheim chronology
Frail (2004)	Will There Be Spring (2006)	In The Deep (2012)

Will There Be Spring is an album by Norwegian singer-songwriter Maria Solheim released in 2006 by Kirkelig Kulturverksted (FXCD 309).

== Background ==
This is Solheims fourth solo album release, including a collection of original songs.

== Track listing ==
(All songs and lyrics by Maria Solheim where not otherwise noted. Arranged by – Emil Nikolaisen & Maria Solheim)

1. "Moonlight" (0:55)
2. "Wildest Day" (3:09)
3. "Where Do People Go" (2:28) – written by Olav Hynnekleiv
4. "All My Thoughts" (3:30)
5. "Ocean Needs Water" (2:31)
6. "Different Seasons" (3:33)
7. "Take My Heart Revisited" (3:44)
8. "Burn The Books" (3:29)
9. "Juice" (3:40) – middle section written by Emil Nikolaisen
10. "You – Every Morning" (3:11)
11. "Mountain Song" (2:09)

== Musicians ==
- David Wallumrød – Piano (tracks 1 & 2), Clavinet (track 3)
- Remi Christiansen – Pedalsteel Guitar (track 1)
- Emil Nikolaisen – Guitar & Percussion (track 2)
- Martin Winstad – Congas (track 2)
- Fredrik Brarud – Drums (track 3)
- Tor Egil Kreken – Double Bass & Banjo (track 3)
- Olav Hynnekleiv – Vocals (track 3)
- Maria Solheim – Solo Guitar (track 3), Guitar, Vocals

== Notes ==
- Mastered by Bjørn Engelmann
- Mixed by Christian Engfelt
- Producer Emil Nikolaisen
- Recorded by Cato Thomassen, Christian Engfelt & Nikolai Eilertsen
- Record Assistant Espen Høydalsvik
