= Manhattan Skyline =

Manhattan Skyline most commonly refers to the skyline of Manhattan, New York City

It may also refer to:

- Manhattan Skyline (band), a Norwegian mathcore band.
- "Manhattan Skyline", a 1976 John Miles song from the album Stranger in the City
- "Manhattan Skyline" (song), a 1987 song by Norwegian band A-ha
- "Manhattan Skyline", a 1977 instrumental piece by David Shire, composed for the film Saturday Night Fever
