= Hilma Nikolaisen =

Norwegian musician (born 1982)

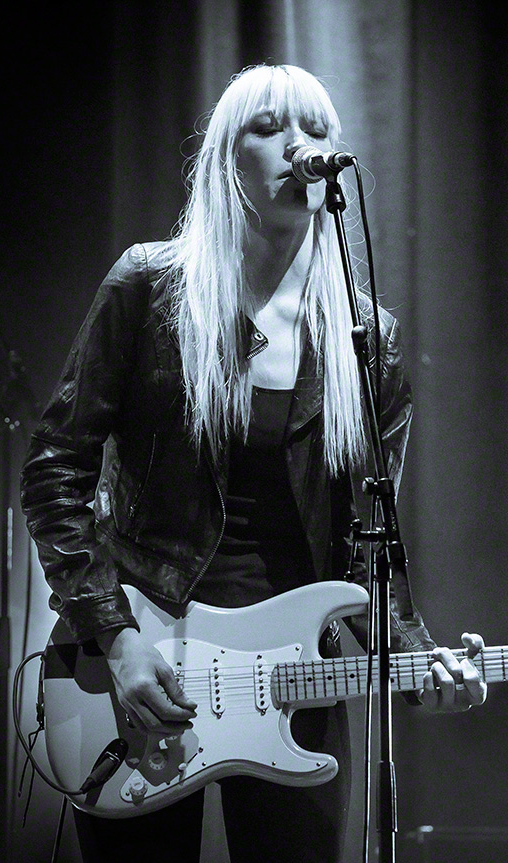
- Nikolaisen in 2016

Background information
- Born: 1 July 1982 (age 43)
- Origin: Moi, Norway
- Genres: Rock, indie, psychedelic rock
- Instruments: Vocals; guitar; bass
- Label: Fysisk Format
- Formerly of: Loch Ness Mouse; Umbrella; Serena-Maneesh

Hilma Nikolaisen (born 1 July 1982) is a Norwegian musician, best known for her work as a solo artist and as a member of the alternative rock band Serena-Maneesh. She is the sister of Emil, Ivar and Elvira Nikolaisen. Nikolaisen has released three studio albums and one live album as a solo artist.

== Career ==
Nikolaisen was previously the vocalist in the trio Umbrella and a member of the band Loch Ness Mouse with her brother Emil. She was the bassist of alternative rock band Serena-Maneesh, fronted by her brother Emil, and also contributed to studio recordings by the band. In 2016, Nikolaisen released her debut solo album, Puzzler, and was nominated for the Norwegian Spellemann Award in the indie category. Her sophomore solo album, Mjusic, was released in 2018. Nikolaisen's third studio album was released in 2021.

== Personal life ==
Nikolaisen was previously in a relationship with former Mayhem vocalist Sven Erik Kristiansen, with whom she shares a son.

== Discography ==
=== Studio albums ===
- Puzzler (2016)
- Mjusic (2018)
- Heritage (2021)

=== Live albums ===
- Limbo Jives (2020)
