= NiBiRu: Age of Secrets =

2005 video game

- Developer(s): Future Games
- Publisher(s): The Adventure Company
- Platform(s): Windows
- Release: FRA: 11 March 2005; CZE: 4 June 2005; NA: 31 August 2005
- Genre(s): Adventure
- Mode(s): Single-player

NiBiRu: Age of Secrets, also known as Ni.Bi.Ru: The messenger of the gods (Czech: NI.BI.RU: Posel Bohů), is a 2005 adventure game developed by Future Games and published by The Adventure Company. According to Future's Martin Malik, it sold roughly 200,000 units by 2009.

== Gameplay ==
Screenshot of the game

The gameplay is very similar to previous Adventure Company games, such as Syberia and its sequel, Syberia II. Another similar title is Secret Files: Tunguska. The player controls the main character, Martin Holan, in fixed-camera, third-person view.

== Plot ==
During the construction of a new highway bypass, workers discover an entrance to an old tunnel. After they enter the tunnel, they find out that it was probably a German tunnel intentionally backfilled at the end of World War II. They contact an employee of the Western Bohemian Museum who then informs the superior body in Prague about their findings. The news about the discovery is published by the regional press the next day and there is tremendous buzz in the archeology community of the new find.

Martin Holan, the main character, is a linguistics and archeology student.

== Development ==
NiBiRu is a remake of the company's first game Messenger of the Gods (1998).

NiBiRu uses the AGDS (Advanced Graphic Development System) engine that apart from standard elements enables several graphical effects like rain, lightning, fog, etc. The primary graphical mode of the gaming engine is 32 bit but there is also a less demanding 16 bit mode for older hardware. The engine was originally developed and used for The Black Mirror horror adventure game.

== Reception ==
According to Future Games president Martin Malik, NiBiRu achieved global sales of roughly 200,000 copies by April 2009. Review aggregation website Metacritic reported the game's critical reception as "mixed or average", based on 12 reviews.

NiBiRu was a nominee for GameSpot's 2005 "Best Adventure Game" award, which ultimately went to Fahrenheit.
