= Thomso (festival) =

Annual cultural festival in Roorkee, Uttarakhand, India

- Status: Active
- Genre: Cultural Festival
- Begins: 14 October 2022
- Ends: 16 October 2022
- Venue: Indian Institute of Technology Roorkee
- Location: Roorkee
- Country: India
- Years active: 1982–present
- Inaugurated: 1982
- Attendance: 40k+
- Area: Roorkee, Uttarakhand
- Major events: Cultural Festival
- Website: http://www.thomso.in

Thomso is the annual cultural fest of Indian Institute of Technology, Roorkee. Established in 1982, the festival is held over a span of three days at the end of October and the beginning of November. The 2018 edition consisted of over 150+ events and hosted 9000+ guest students from 200 colleges across India, in addition to more than 12,000 students from the hosting institution.

== History ==
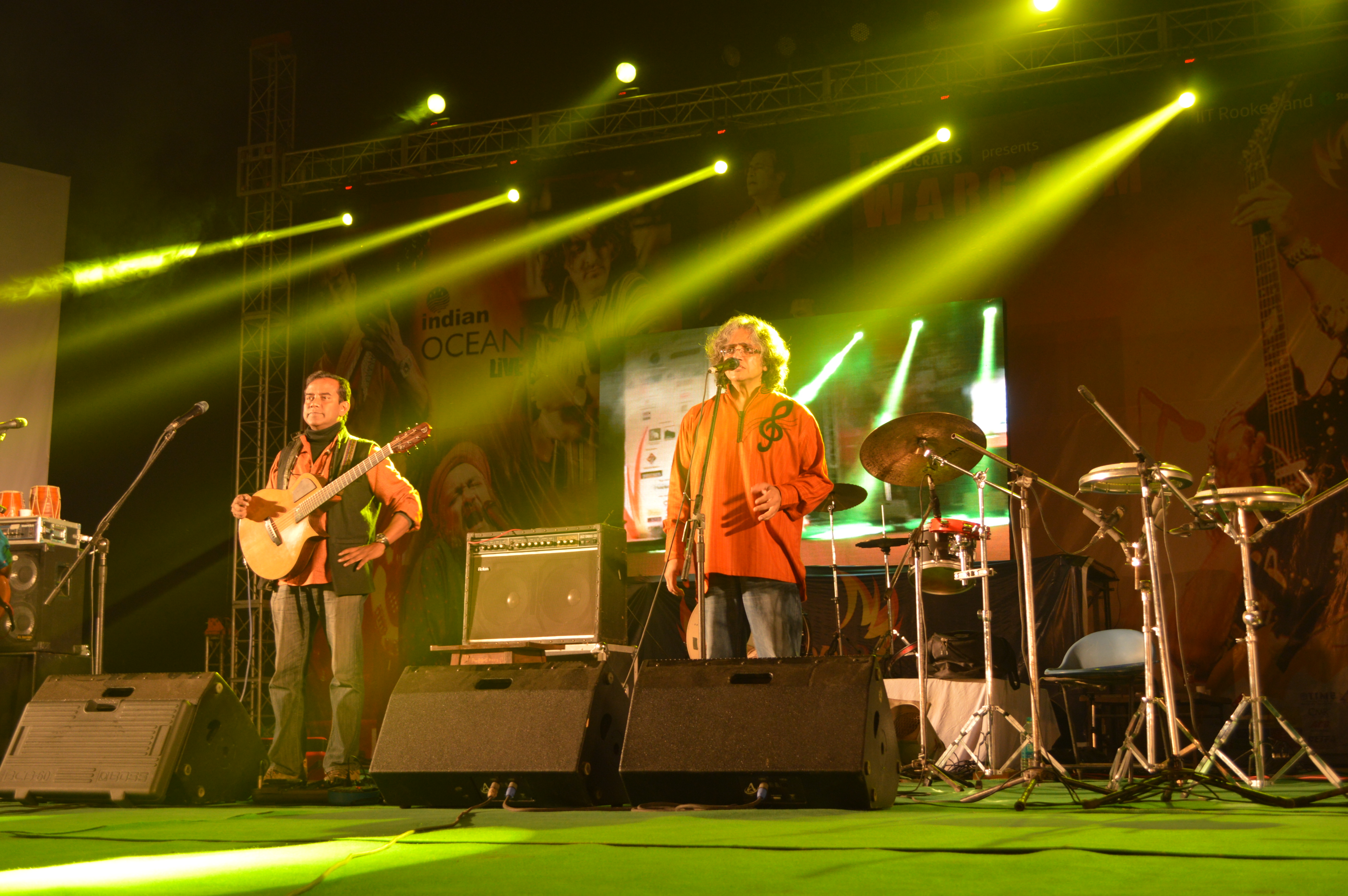
A performance by rock band Indian Ocean at Thomso

The festival is named after its founder, Sir James Thomason, lieutenant governor 1843–53, the founder of the Thomason College of Civil Engineering in 1853, which later became the University of Roorkee in 1948, and, IIT Roorkee in 2001.

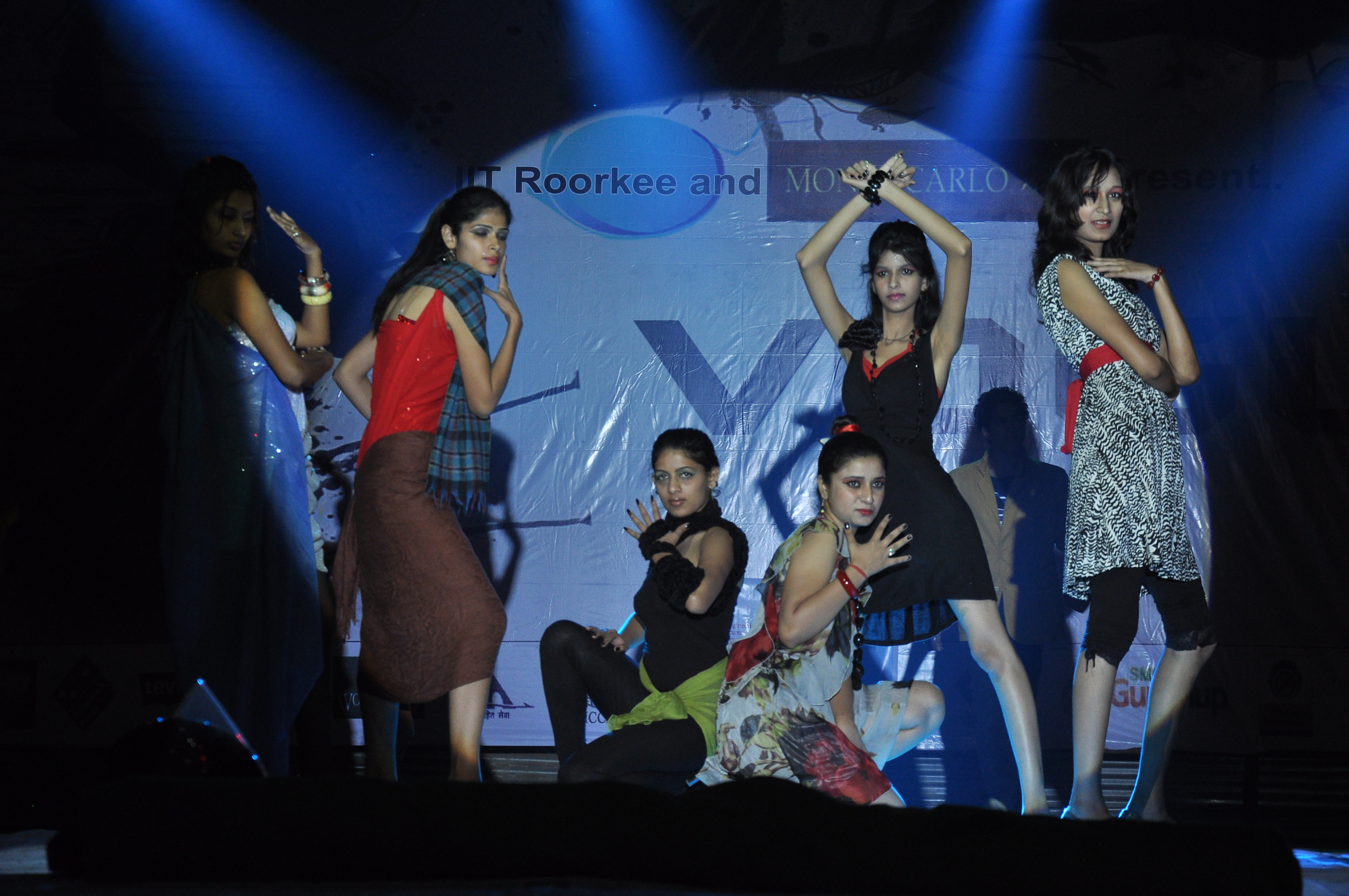
Vogue Fashion show

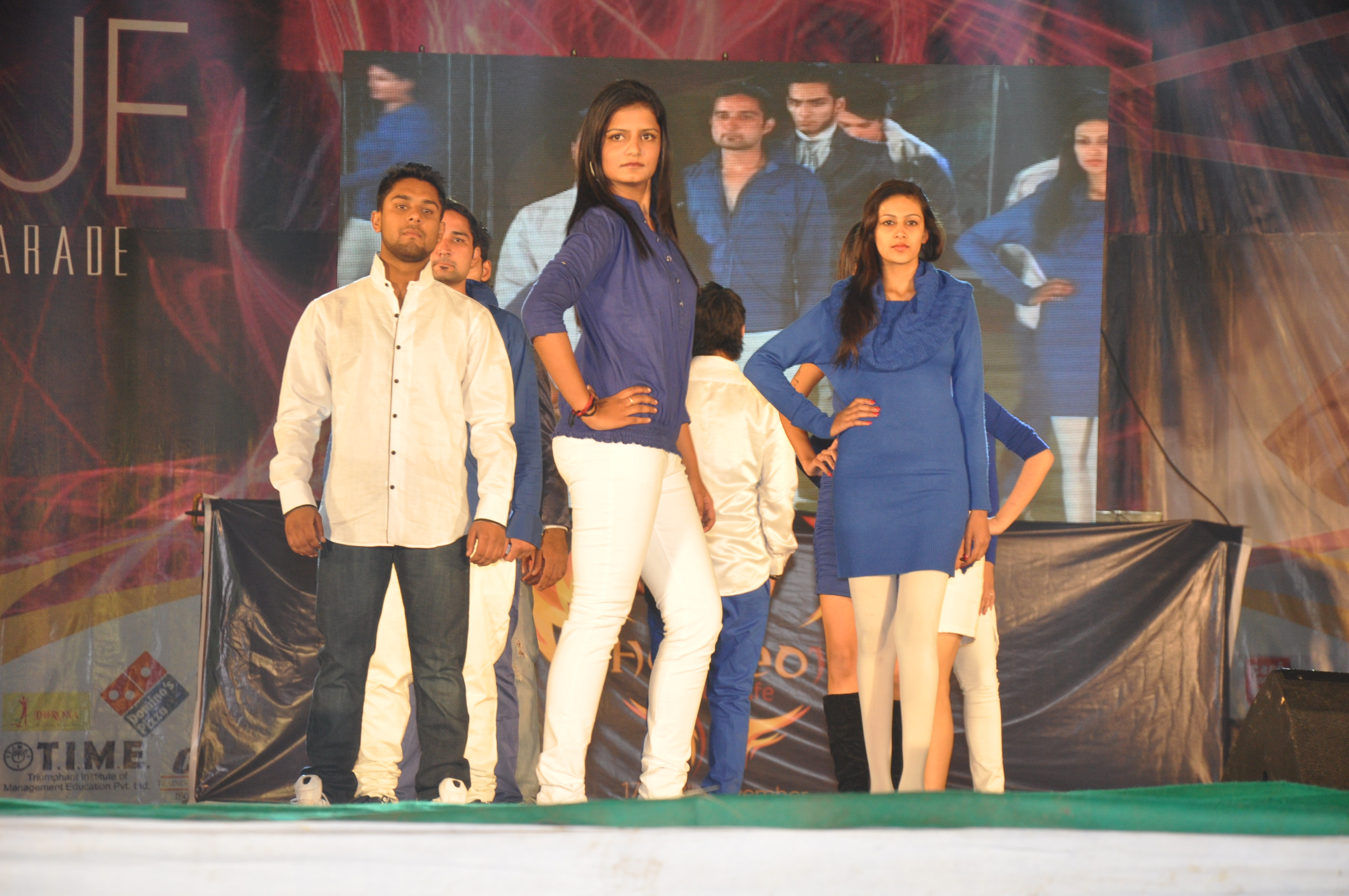
Vogue fashion show at Thomso

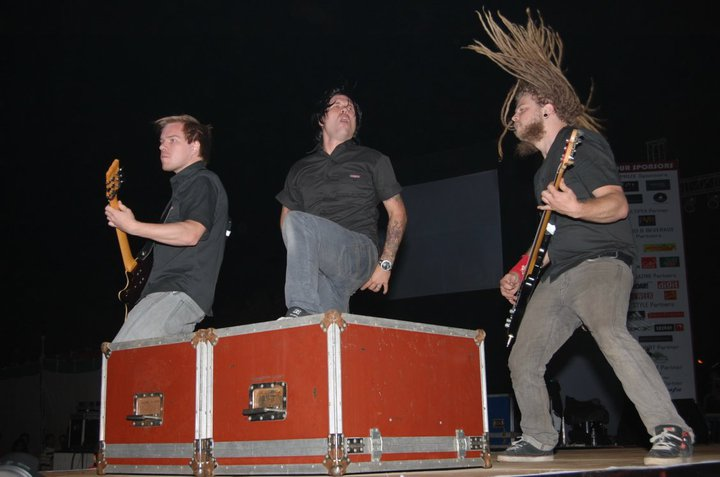
Benea Reach at Wargasm, Thomso 2009.

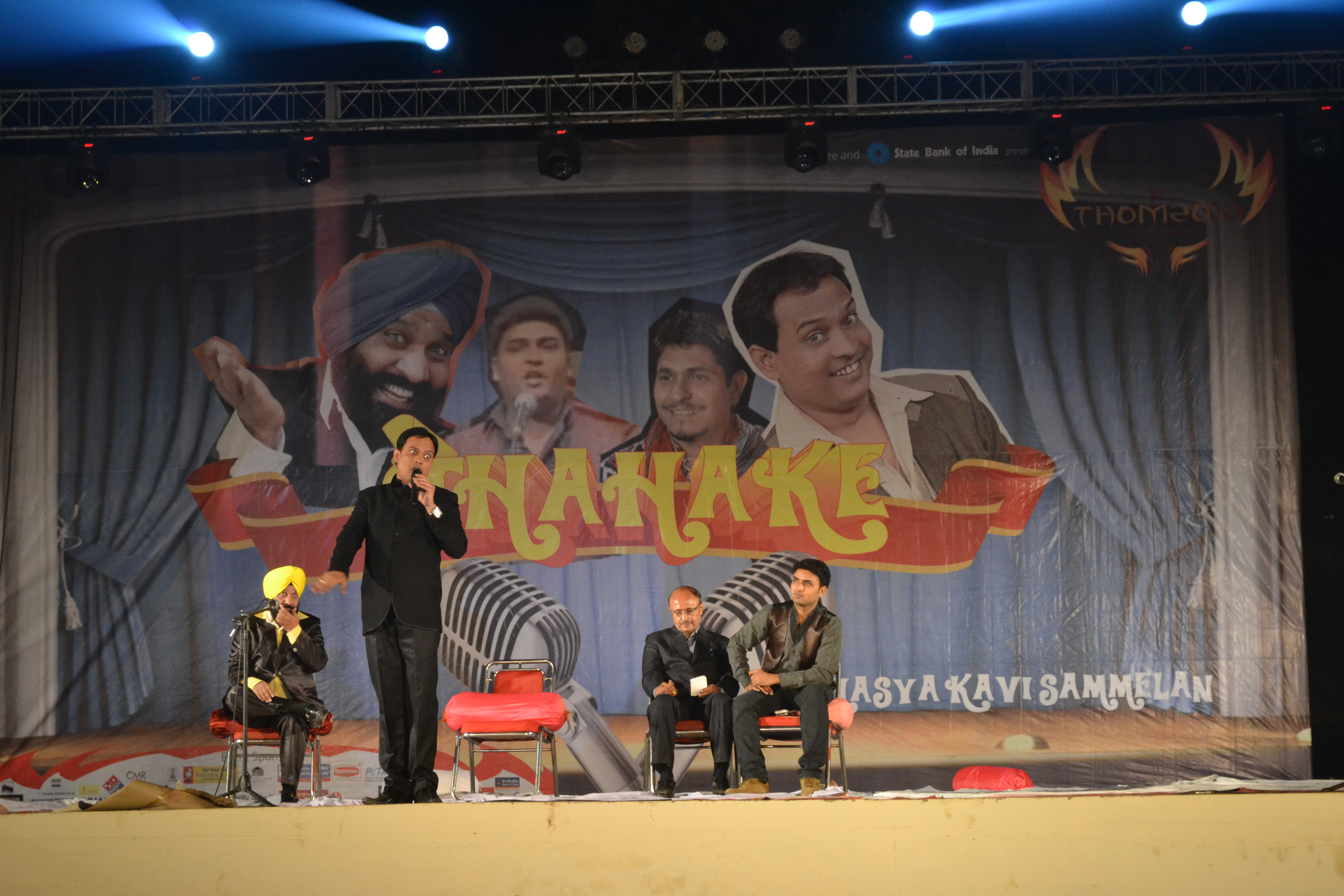
Stand-up comedian Sunil Pal at Thahake, Hasya Kavi sammelan at Thomso.

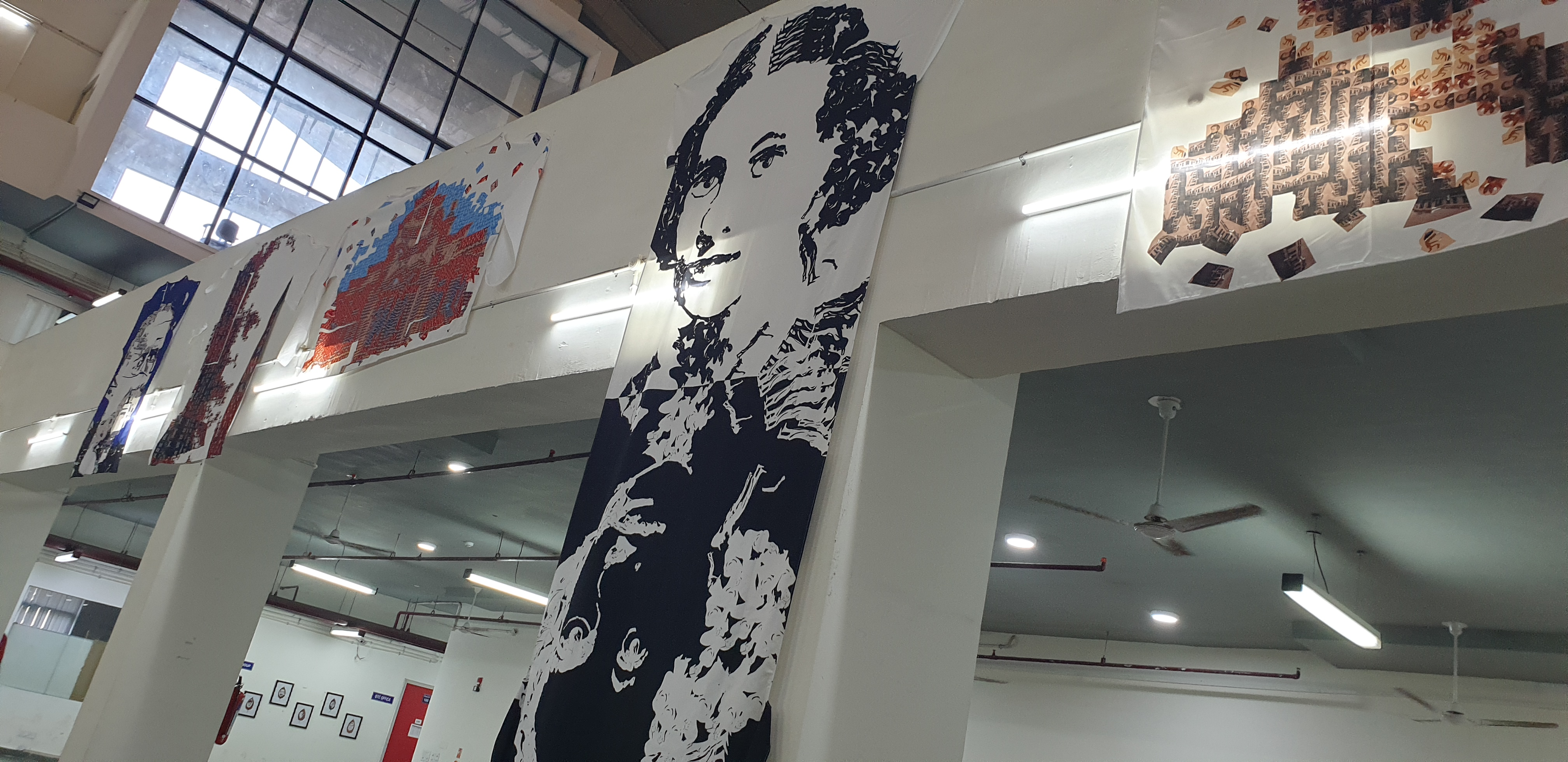
Art Exhibition Thomso 22, Garbade, 2022

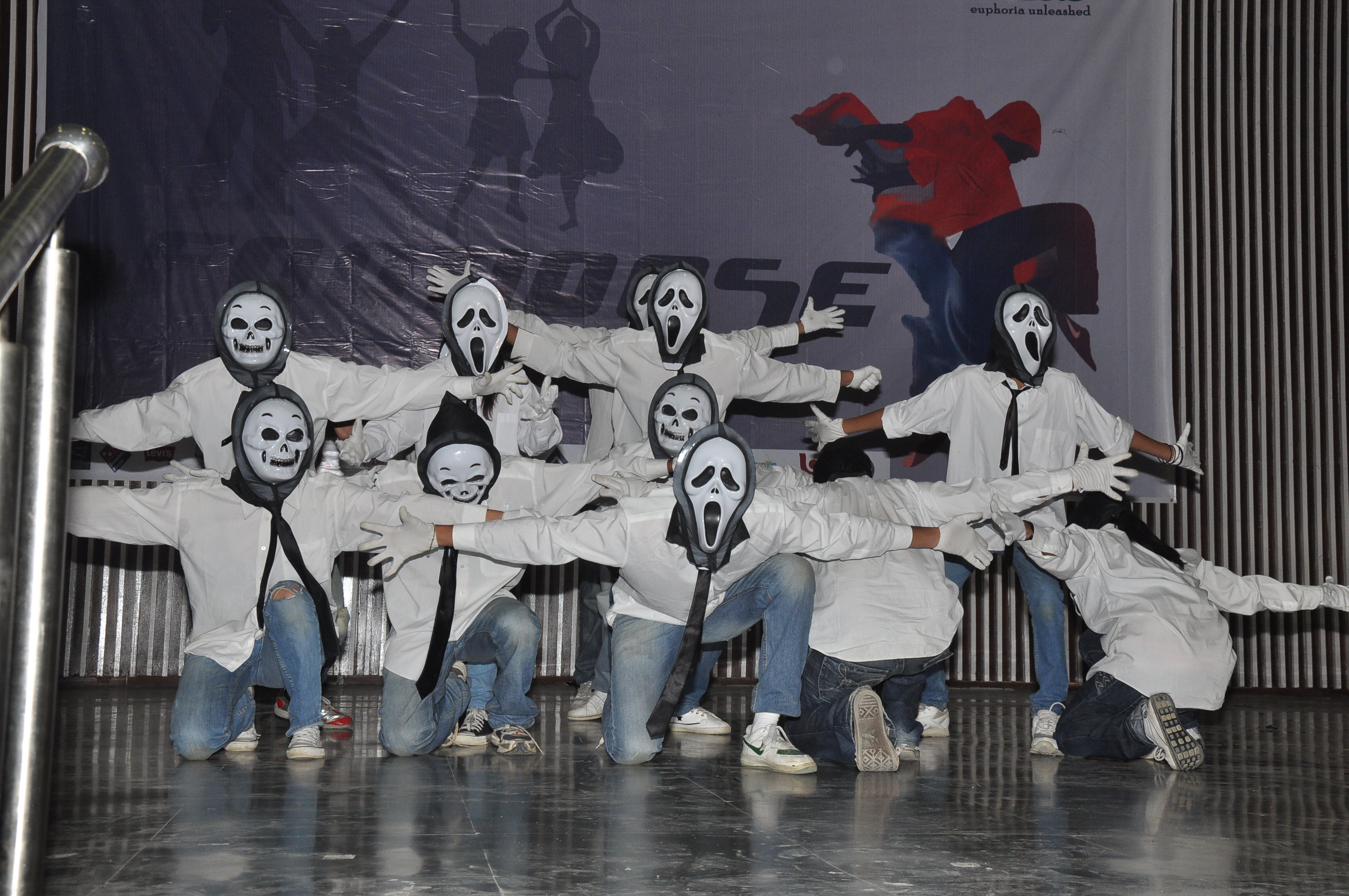
Footloose, Thomso 2010

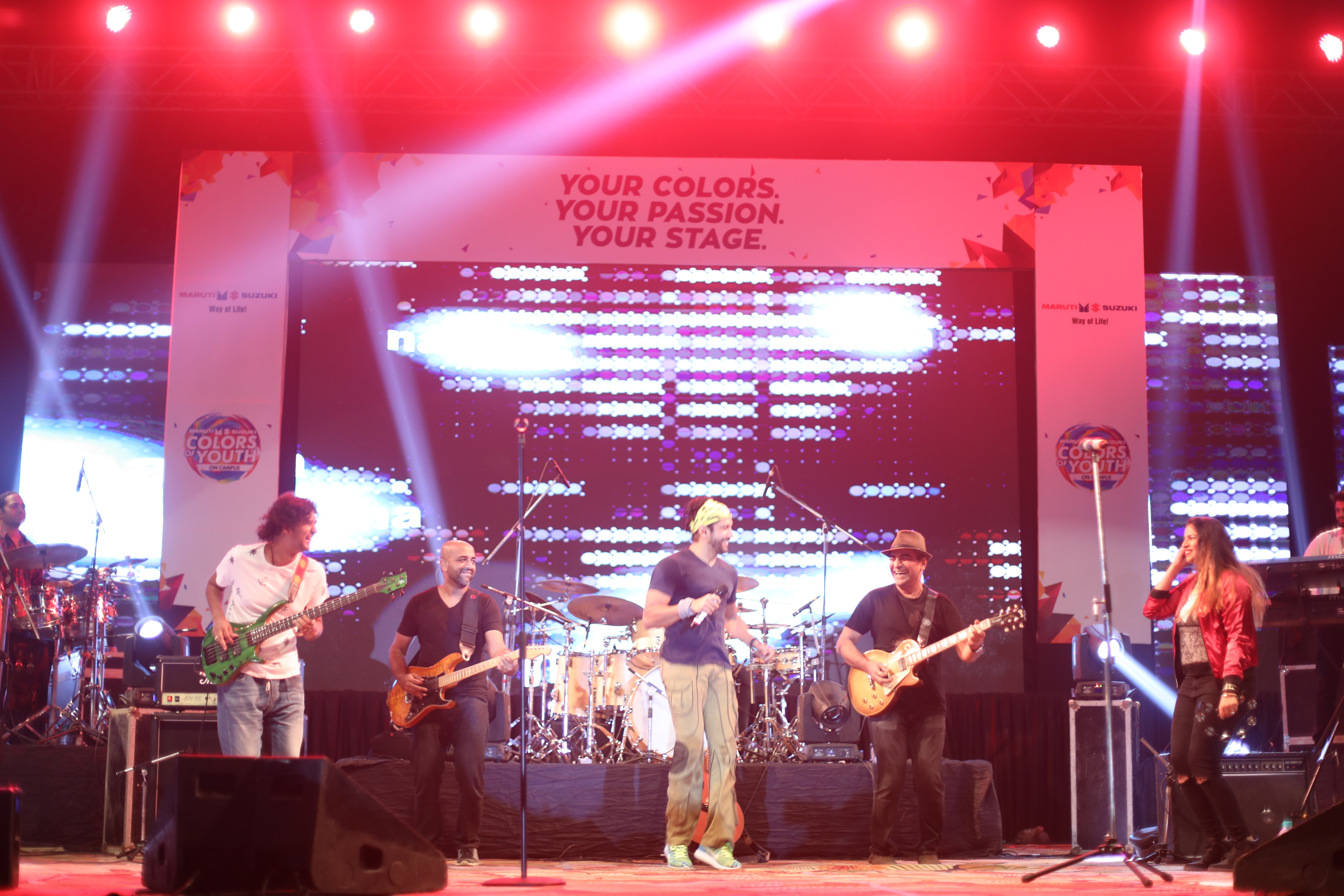
Farhan Akhtar performing at Xhileration, Thomso 2017
