= Death Is Not Glamorous =

Norwegian hardcore band

- Origin: Oslo, Norway
- Genres: Hardcore punk, melodic hardcore
- Years active: 2005–2014
- Labels: Fysisk Format
- Members: Christian Medaas; Even Skår; Espen Bjerved; Terje Moxness Kortner; Mathias Albinsson; Emanuele Lapponi
- Website: deathisnotglamorous.bandcamp.com

Death Is Not Glamorous was a Norwegian hardcore punk band from Oslo, Norway.

== History ==
In 2005, Death Is Not Glamorous released a demo, titled Demo 2005. In 2006, Death Is Not Glamorous released an EP titled Undercurrents. In 2007, the band released a split with the band The Down and Outs. The band also released a split with the band Another Year in 2007. Death Is Not Glamorous released their first full-length album in 2008, titled Soft Clicks. In 2011, the band released their second album, Spring Forward. In 2013, the band released a split with the band Shook Ones via Run for Cover Records.
