= Serena Maneesh (album) =

Serena-Maneesh

Studio album by Serena-Maneesh
- Released: August 29, 2005
- Recorded: April – October 2004
- Genres: Shoegaze, indie rock, noise pop
- Length: 58:16
- Label: HoneyMilk Records
- Producers: Emil Nikolaisen, Daniel Smith

Serena-Maneesh chronology
Zurück (2005)	Serena-Maneesh (2005)	Serena Maneesh 2: Abyss in B Minor (2010)

Singles from Serena Maneesh
- 1. "Drain Cosmetics" Released: June 12, 2006; 2. "Sapphire Eyes" Released: October 2, 2006

Serena Maneesh (or Serena-Maneesh) is the debut album by Serena Maneesh. The album was partly recorded in Steve Albini's respected Electrical Audio Recordings studio in Chicago as well as in various facilities in New York City and Oslo. Contributors to the album include Sufjan Stevens, Martin Bisi (who worked with Sonic Youth and Iggy Pop) and co-producer Daniel Smith of Danielson Famile.

The album yielded two singles: "Drain Cosmetics" in June 2006, and "Sapphire Eyes" in October 2006. "Beehiver II" is an alternative version of the song "Beehiver," first released on the band's 2002 EP Fixxations. An alternate version of "Sapphire Eyes," subtitled Serena-Maneesh Refix, was released as a digital single, as a B-side on the "Drain Cosmetics" single, and on the split single with American band Blood on the Wall.

== Reception ==
Professional ratings
Aggregate scores
Source	Rating
Metacritic	84/100
Review scores
Source	Rating
AllMusic	4/5 stars
Alternative Press	5/5 stars
Drowned in Sound	9/10
Entertainment Weekly	B+
The Guardian	4/5 stars
NME	8/10
Pitchfork	8.6/10
PopMatters	8/10
Uncut	8/10
Under the Radar	8/10

Critical reception to the album was positive. Pitchfork graded the album 8.6 out of 10 and rated the album as one of the Top 50 Albums of 2005. Norway's national newspaper Dagbladet rated it Norwegian Album of the Year, and AllMusic awarded the album 4 stars out of 5.

== Track listing ==
All tracks are written by Emil Nikolaisen.

No.	Title	Length
1.	"Drain Cosmetics"	3:41
2.	"Selina's Melodie Fountain"	5:39
3.	"Un-Deux"	1:56
4.	"Candlelighted"	6:36
5.	"Beehiver II"	4:44
6.	"Her Name Is Suicide"	3:44
7.	"Sapphire Eyes"	7:09
8.	"Don't Come Down Here"	7:20
9.	"Chorale Lick"	3:16
10.	"Simplicity"	1:56
11.	"Your Blood in Mine"	12:09
Total length:		58:16

== Personnel ==
- Emil Nikolaisen – vocals, guitar, bass, samples, organ, vibes, drums, piano, harmonium, mellotron, mandolin
- Anders Møller – percussion
- David Wallumrød – organ
- Anders Salomon Lidal – flute, analog synth
- Sondre Tristan Midttun – guitar
- Lina Holmström – vocals
- Eivind Schou – violin
- Hilma Nikolaisen – vocals
- Håvard Krogedal – cello, organ
- Harald Frøland – guitar
- Sufjan Stevens – flute, marimba
- Inge Svege – harmonica
- Hilde Bialach – cello
- Samuel Durling – Indian vibes
- Dag Stiberg – sax
- Daniel Smith – backing vocals
- Asle Eikrem – tamburin

== Production ==
- Christian Engfelt – mixing
- Marius Bodin – mixing
- Morten Lund – mastering
- Ingar Hunskaar – pre-mastering
- Tommy Akerholdt – drums, co-arranger
- Björn Engelmann – mastering
- Martin Bisi – samples, mixing
- Espen Høydalsvik – percussion, engineer
- Greg Norman – sound engineer

== Release history ==
Country	Date	Label	Format	Catalogue #
Norway	29 August 2005	HoneyMilk Records	CD	HONEY020
Norway	20 December 2005	Hype City Recordings	2LP	HCR-011
North America	9 May 2006	Playlouder Recordings/Beggars Group	CD	PLAYR4CD
North America	23 May 2006	Playlouder Recordings/Beggars Group	2LP	PLAYR4LP
United Kingdom	26 June 2006	Playlouder Recordings/Beggars Group	CD	PLAYR4CD
United Kingdom	26 June 2006	Playlouder Recordings/Beggars Group	2LP	PLAYR4LP
