= Alleviat =

Studio album by Benea Reach
- Released: February 4, 2008 (Scandinavia), January 6, 2009 (US)
- Recorded: 2007
- Genres: Metalcore, sludge metal, progressive metal
- Length: 50:22
- Label: Indie Europe/Zoom
- Producer: Christian Wibe

Benea Reach chronology
Monument Bineothan (2006)	Alleviat (2008)	Possession (2013)

Professional ratings
Review scores
Source	Rating
Metal.de	8/10
MetalReviews.com	92/100

Alleviat is the second full-length album by Norwegian metal band Benea Reach. The album was released in Scandinavia on February 4, 2008, and on January 6, 2009 in the United States.

The album was mixed at Antfarm Studios by Danish producer Tue Madsen.

== Track listing ==
All lyrics and music by Benea Reach

1. "Awakening" - 3:40
2. "New Waters" - 3:25
3. "Lionize" - 6:21
4. "Sentiment" - 3:20
5. "Reason" - 5:56
6. "Legacy" - 3:43
7. "Rejuvenate" - 4:37
8. "Illume" - 3:54
9. "Zenith" - 4:29
10. "Unconditional" - 4:33
11. "Dominion" - 6:24

== Credits ==
Benea Reach

- Ilkka Volume - vocals and lyricism
- Hakon Sagen - guitars, lap steel guitar, bass guitar on "Illume", chorus background vocals on "Legacy" and "Dominion",[composing, lyricism, additional bass guitar on "Rejuvenate"
- Martin Sivertsen - guitars, composing on "Sentiment"
- Marco Storm - drums, bass guitar on all tracks except "Illume", guitars on "Awakening", sampling, synthesizer, composing, lyricism, album art and layout
- Alwin Nedrum - Digital Audio, Noise, Keyboards, Backing Vocals
- Christer Espevoll - Guitars

Production

- Christian Wibe - Production, additional synthesizer on "Awakening"
- Tue Madsen - Audio Mixing, Additional Sampler on "Dominion"
- Maria Solheim - Vocals on "Reason"
- Mikael Wildén - vocals on "Reason"
- Marte Lavik - vocals on "Rejuvenate" and "Illume"
- Lars Pettersen - Photography
