= Possession (Benea Reach album) =

Studio album by Benea Reach
- Released: 22 March 2013
- Genre: Metalcore, mathcore, djent
- Label: Spinefarm
- Producer: Tue Madsen

Benea Reach chronology
Alleviat (2008)	Possession (2013)

Professional ratings
Review scores
Source	Rating
Metal Hammer	3.5/5 stars
It-Djents	8/9-10

Possession is the third and final album by the metalcore band, Benea Reach.

== Critical reception ==
Adam Rees of Metal Hammer wrote "However, it’s the centrepiece, Crown, that encompasses everything that makes Possession such a startling achievement, melding heaviness and haunting beauty with deft ease." Andy Synn of No Clean Singing stated "The performances are impeccable, the passion is palpable, and the end result is truly magical. A triumph of creativity over popularity."

== Track listing ==
No.	Title	Length
1.	"Woodland"	5:24
2.	"The Mountain"	3:20
3.	"Desolate"	4:04
4.	"Nocturnal"	4:07
5.	"Crown"	5:40
6.	"Empire"	4:09
7.	"Shedding Skin"	5:09
8.	"Fallen"	4:10
9.	"Constellation"	3:45
10.	"The Dark"	5:21
11.	"Aura"	5:00
Total length:		50:09

== Personnel ==
Benea Reach

- Ilkka Viitasalo - Vocals, Backing Vocals
- Marco Storm - Drums, Percussion, Guitar, Keyboards, Programming, Backing Vocals
- Mikael Wildøn - Bass, Guitar, Keyboards, Programming, Backing Vocals
- Martin Silverstein - Guitar
- Thomas Wang - Guitar, Keyboards, Backing Vocals

Additional musicians

- Bruce Fitzhugh - Vocals
- Ingvild Østgård - Vocals, Choir Vocals
- Elisa Herbig - Cello
- Ombeline Chardes - Violin, Viola
- Maria Solheim - Vocals, Choir Vocals
- Elisabeth C. Berglihn - Choir Vocals

Production

- Tue Madsen - Producer, Mixing, Mastering
