= Zurück =

EP by Serena Maneesh
- Released: June 20, 2005
- Recorded: 1999–2003
- Genres: Shoegaze, noise pop
- Length: 21:24
- Label: HoneyMilk Records

Serena Maneesh chronology
Fixxations (2002)	Zurück (2005)	Serena Maneesh (2005)

Professional ratings
Review scores
Source	Rating
AllMusic	3.5/5 stars

Zurück is a retrospective enhanced EP by Norwegian band Serena Maneesh, recorded during the period from 1999 to 2003. It was released in 2005 by HoneyMilk Records. "Zurück" and "Sehnsucht" are German words respectively for "back" and "desire".

== Track listing ==
1. "Introspection" – 4:49
2. "Leipziger Love" – 3:04
3. "Degenerate" – 3:02
4. "Sehnsucht" / Drag Me Upstairs – 4:13
5. "Never – 6:16"
6. "Drive Me Home the Lonely Nights" (promo video) – 3:11
7. "Ich Bin Geil" – 0:69
8. "Ich Bin Ein Fettes Grosses Schwein"

== Personnel ==
- Lina Holmström
- Sondre Tristan Midttun
- Eivind Schou
- Håvard Krogedal
- Morten Øby
- Tommy Akerholdt
- Emil Nikolaisen

== Media links ==
- Drive Me Home The Lonely Nights promo video
