= Messenger of the Gods =

1998 video game

Messenger of the Gods (a.k.a. Posel bohů) is a 1998 Czech adventure game developed and published by Future Games. It would be remade in the 2005 as NiBiRu: Age of Secrets, released by Future Games.

== Production ==
The game began to be developed in 1996 by two graphic designers and one programmer who met at school: Pavel Pekárka, Michal Pekárka, and Jan Hilgard. The musician Zdeněk Houb was added to the team as co-author of the screenplay. Work on the game initially took place at home on older PCs. Unlike other Czech adventures of the period, this one did not have a humorous element. In addition, the game was notable for having the player see the action through the player's eyes like in Asmodeus, rather than a third-person view. The developers sought inspiration from the LucasArts' series of Indiana Jones games.

The game was premiered at the 1998 Invex, and entered into the JRC distribution network.

It became one of the most successful Czech games.

== Plot and gameplay ==
The player is archaeological expert Stanislav Novotny, who is on a mission to discover a Mayan mystery.

The game contains many logical-themed puzzles. It contains 100 game screens, VGA graphics, professionally dubbed dialogue, and 50 scenic tracks.

== Reception ==
This game was overlooked in many of the local gaming magazines such as Score and Excalibur. It sold over 1,500 units in the Czech Republic, which Future Games called "relatively enough for Czech conditions".

According to Petr Ticháček of Bonusweb.cz, the title is the largest and most difficult game he had ever played.
