= Alter Ego (2010 video game) =

2010 video game

- Developer: Future Games
- Publisher: Viva Media
- Platform: Windows
- Release: RU: 18 February 2010; GER: 26 March 2010; NA: 3 August 2010
- Genre: Adventure
- Mode: Single-player

Alter Ego is an adventure game developed by the Czech company Future Games in 2010. The game uses the AGDS Engine. It was the last game by Future Games.

== Story ==
The story takes place in Plymouth of 19th century. Sir William, who is a suspected serial killer, dies. His body disappears and people in town start to disappear. The story revolves around police investigator Briscol and thief Timothy Moor who is involved in the case against his will.

== Gameplay ==
Screenshot

Alter Ego is a 2.5D point'n'click adventure game. Three-dimensional characters act in front of pre-rendered 2D backgrounds. With their mouse the player can move the two main characters around and examine and manipulate the game world. With the story progressing, new parts of the game world are unlocked.

== Reception ==
The game's reception has been average. The game was praised for its graphics and atmosphere but was criticized for its difficulty, story and ending.
