= Fixxations =

EP by Serena Maneesh
- Released: December 2002
- Recorded: February – May 2002
- Genres: Shoegaze, noise pop
- Length: 14:57
- Labels: HoneyMilk Records, Hype City Recordings
- Producer: Emil Nikolaisen

Serena Maneesh chronology
Fixxations (2002)	Zurück (2005)

Fixxations is the debut EP by Norwegian band Serena Maneesh, released in 2002 on CD by HoneyMilk Records and on 12" vinyl by Hype City Recordings.

== Track listing ==
1. Drive Me Home the Lonely Nights – 3:16
2. Blues Like Beehive – 3:23
3. Ballad of Jeze Ballet – 5:25
4. Hear Bleed Philharmonic – 2:52
5. Oxygene, Please! (bonus track on 12" vinyl edition)

== Production ==
The EP was recorded at Spendless during February–March 2002.

The songs were composed by Emil Nikolaisen, Lina Holmström and Håvard Krogedal. "Blues Like Beehive" was re-recorded as "Beehiver II" for the band's full-length debut album Serena Maneesh (2005).

== Personnel ==
- Lina Holmström: bass, organ, vocals
- Håvard Krogedal: organ, bass
- Emil Nikolaisen: guitar, vocals
- Marko Hautakoski: drums
- Marcus Forsgren: guitar
- Eivind Schou: violin, "space sounds"
- Harald Frøland: guitar (track 3)
- Sondre Tristan Midttun: guitar (track 1)
- Arve Paulsen: flute (tracks 3 and 4)
- Ole Johannes Åleskjær: backing vocals (track 1)
- Thor Eivind Nordgarden: vocals (track 3)
- Johnny Skalleberg: mix
- Christian Engfelt: mix
