= Serena Maneesh 2: Abyss in B Minor =

Serena-Maneesh 2: Abyss in B Minor

Studio album by Serena-Maneesh
- Released: March 22, 2010
- Recorded: 2008–2010
- Genre: Shoegazing, indie rock, noise pop
- Length: 37:25
- Label: 4AD (CAD 3X07)
- Producer: Emil Nikolaisen

Serena-Maneesh chronology
Serena Maneesh (2005)	Serena-Maneesh 2: Abyss in B Minor (2010)

Singles from Serena Maneesh 2: Abyss in B Minor
- 1. "Ayisha Abyss" Released: January 18, 2010

Professional ratings
Review scores
Source	Rating
Allmusic	4/5 stars
Contactmusic.com	(positive)
The Daily Telegraph	4/5 stars
Drowned in Sound	(8/10)
The Independent	4/5 stars
Pitchfork Media	(6.4/10)
Sputnikmusic	4.5/5 stars

Serena-Maneesh 2: Abyss in B Minor (stylized as either S-M 2, #2, or No. 2) is the second studio album by Serena Maneesh. The album was recorded over a period of two years, and was partly recorded in a cave outside of Oslo, Norway, according to frontman Emil Nikolaisen:

Studio environments often get on my nerves... and I love the underworld, you can silently head down there and do as you please, leave the world behind. So we found this huge cave with stone walls, it looked like a refugee hideout from World War II, with a huge, undiscovered treasure of sound.

The album features the single "Ayisha Abyss," released as a limited edition 12" single (backed with the exclusive B-side "Call-Back from a Dream") on January 18, 2010. A music video for the song "I Just Want to See Your Face" premiered on 4AD's website on March 12, 2010.

== Track listing ==
All tracks are written by Emil Nikolaisen.

No.	Title	Length
1.	"Ayisha Abyss"	7:47
2.	"I Just Want to See Your Face"	2:19
3.	"Reprobate!"	3:39
4.	"Melody for Jaana"	5:53
5.	"Blow Yr Brains in the Mourning Rain"	4:28
6.	"Honeyjinx"	4:25
7.	"D.I.W.S.W.T.T.D."	2:51
8.	"Magdalena (Symphony #8)"	6:06
Total length:		37:25

== Production credits ==
- Produced and edited by Emil Nikolaisen.
- Recorded and overdubbed by Christian Engfelt in the bunker and at CSX.
- Mixed by Nick Terry at The Strongroom, except:
  - "Reprobate!" mixed at Harry's Gym Recording Studios.
  - "Blow Yr Brains" and "D.I.W.S.W.T.T.D." mixed at Grandsport.
- Additional overdubbing, editing, and productive ideas by Nick Terry.
- Additional recording and overdubbing by Bjarne Stensli at Harry's, René Tinner at Grandsport, Daniel C. Smith in his NJ recreation room, and Emil Nikolaisen at CSX.
- Gong recorded by Don Dons at Hangaround Sounds.
- Mastered by Ray Staff at Air.
- Master edit by Tom Kvålsvoll at Strype.
- Sleeve design by Dangermüz; assistance by PDW.
- Photography by Lars Petter Pettersen and Ghostkamera.
