= Benea Reach =

Norwegian progressive metal band

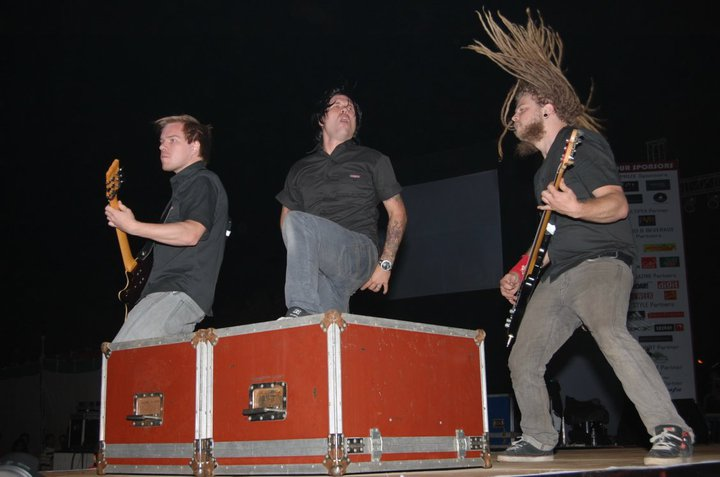
- Benea Reach at "Xhileration", Thomso '09 Cultural Festival of IIT Roorkee

Background information
- Origin: Oslo, Norway
- Genres: Metalcore; sludge metal; progressive metal
- Years active: 2003–2014
- Labels: Tabu, Candlelight
- Members: Ilkka Volume; Mikael Wildén; Martin Sivertsen; Andreas Berglihn; Marco Storm; Thomas Wang
- Past members: Christer Espevoll; Håkon Nakken; Tor Magne Glidje; Anders Lidal; Tor Erik Drangsland; Morten Holmquist; Håkon Sagen; Alwin Nedrum
- Website: beneareach.com

Benea Reach was a Norwegian progressive metal band based in Oslo. The band was nominated for a Spellemannsprisen Award in the metal category, and at one time included guitarist Christer Espevoll of progressive metal band Extol.

== History ==
Drummer Marco Storm and vocalist Ilkka Volume of Selfmindead formed Benea Reach on 22 March 2003. Morten (bass guitar), Tor (guitar), Erik (guitar), and Anders (digital audio) joined them. This incarnation of the band lasted for a year and disbanded. During this time, a live demo EP was recorded. In 2004, the pair recruited four new members, including Christer Espevoll, formerly of Extol. The band recorded a demo of the song "Pandemonium", which was distributed among different record labels. After receiving good responses, the band signed a deal with Tabu Recordings and released their first full-length, Monument Bineothan, which earn the band a nomination at the 35th Annual Spellemannsprisen in the metal category against Enslaved, Gorgoroth, and Keep of Kalessin. In August 2007, the band's website announced that they would record their follow-up to "Monument" with Danish producer Tue Madsen.

On 26 December 2007, the band's official Myspace announced their forthcoming album, Alleviat, released in Scandinavia in February 2008. Around October until November 2008, Benea Reach toured with The Chariot and The Satire.

In October 2009, the band toured India, with concerts at The Great Indian Rock Festival in Pune, Delhi and Bangalore from 23 to 26 October and at Thomso '09 Cultural Festival of IIT Roorkee on 31 October. On 11 January 2014, Benea Reach announced that they would disband after their last scheduled shows in March.

== Influences ==
Marco Storm, drummer and primary spokesperson for the band, has mentioned in multiple interviews bands such as Meshuggah, Neurosis, and Botch as primary influences for their sound. More specifically the Meshuggah EP None. Other influences include The Dillinger Escape Plan, My Bloody Valentine, Cult of Luna, Tool, and Mastodon.

== Members ==
Final line-up

- Ilkka Volume - vocals (2003-2014) (Selfmindead)
- Marco Storm - drums (2003-2014) (Selfmindead, ex-Serena-Maneesh)
- Martin "Heddal" Sivertsen - guitars (2003-2014) (Mantric [Live])
- Andreas Berglihn - guitars (2010-2014)
- Mikael Wildén - bass guitar (2010-2014)
- Thomas Wang - guitars, keyboards (2011-2014)

Former

- Håkon Sagen - guitar (2003-2009) (Shining, ex-Marty Friedman [Live])
- Christer Espevoll - guitar (2003-2011) (ex-Extol, ex-Absurd²)
- Håkon Nakken - bass guitar (2003-2010) (Selfmindead)
- Morten Holmquist - bass guitar (2003) (ex-Selfmindead)
- Tor Erik Drangsland - guitars (2003) (ex-Selfmindead)
- Alwin Nedrum - programming, guitars (2008-2011)
- Tor Magne Glidje - guitars (2003) (Lengsel, ex-Extol, Mantric, ex-Ganglion)
- Anders Lidal - programming, keyboards (2003) (Mantric)

Live musicians

- Tommy Hjelm - guitars (2009)

Timeline

== Discography ==
Studio albums

- Monument Bineothan (2006)
- Alleviat (2008)
- Possession (2013)

Demo

- Pandemonium (2004)
