= Behind Closed Doors (Maria Solheim album) =

Studio album by Maria Solheim
- Released: 2002
- Label: Kirkelig Kulturverksted
- Producer: Bengt Egil Hanssen

Maria Solheim chronology
Barefoot (2001)	Behind Closed Doors (2002)	Frail (2004)

Behind Closed Doors is an album by Norwegian singer-songwriter Maria Solheim, released in 2002 by Kirkelig Kulturverksted (FXCD 253).

== Track listing ==
(All lyrics and compositions by Maria Solheim)

1. Two Minutes and Ten Hours
2. Kingdom
3. Hiding Place
4. It's Not a Matter Of
5. Beauty Queen
6. Train Underwater
7. The Man Who Left His Past
8. Richard
9. You Want to Buy It Instead
10. Behind Closed Doors
11. Late at Night

== Musicians ==
- Vocals and guitars: Maria Solheim
- Guitars, Pedalsteel: Kjetil Steensnæs
- Fender Rhodes, vocals, Wurlitzer, Hammond: David Wallumrød
- Drums and Percussion: Torstein Lofthus
- Bass, Fender bass: Tor Egil Kreken
- Keyboards: Bengt Egil Hanssen

== Notes ==
- Producer: Bengt Egil Hanssen
- Photo: Elisabeth Sperre Alnes
- AD photo, styling: Iram Haq
- Cover design: Camilla Skår Sletten
- Recorded at Lydlab a/s by George Tanderø
- Mixed at Lydlab a/s by Ulf W. Ø. Holand
- Mastered at Cutting Room Studios, Stockholm by Björn Engelmann

The song "Train underwater" has been dedicated to SOS Children's Villages Norway. All income of this song will be given in full to the organisation.

== Trivia ==
- Richard, the eighth track on the album, has appeared in the anime BECK: Mongolian Chop Squad.
