= Future Games (video game developer) =

Czech video game developer

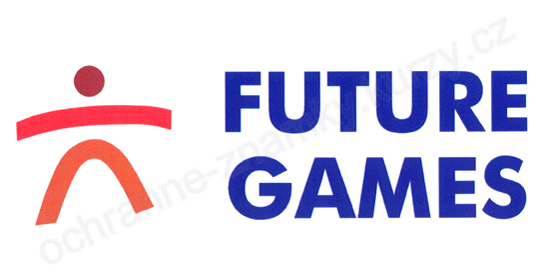
- Industry: Game development
- Founded: 1996
- Defunct: 2011
- Headquarters: Beroun, Czech Republic
- Key people: Martin Malik

Future Games was a video game company based in Beroun, Czech Republic. The company focused mostly on adventure games. The studio was closed in 2011 due to financial problems after release of Alter Ego.

== Released titles ==
All games by Future Games
Title	Original title	Date of release	Description
Boovie	Boovie	1998	Puzzle game inspired by Flappy.
Bloodie	Bloodie	1998	Action freeware game released to promote Boovie.
Messenger of the Gods	Posel bohů	1998	Adventure game.
The Black Mirror	Posel smrti	2003	The most successful game by Future games. Horror adventure game. It is considered to be the best Czech adventure video game ever.
NiBiRu: Age of Secrets	NI.BI.RU: Posel Bohů	2005	Remake of Messenger of the Gods. Also known as Ni.Bi.Ru: Messenger of the Gods.
Next Life	Reprobates / Zatracenci	2007	Horror sci-fi adventure game.
Tale of a Hero	Tale of a Hero	2008	Fairy tale adventure game.
Alter Ego	Alter Ego	2010	The last game by company. The game was largely unsuccessful.
