= Fysisk Format =

Norwegian record label

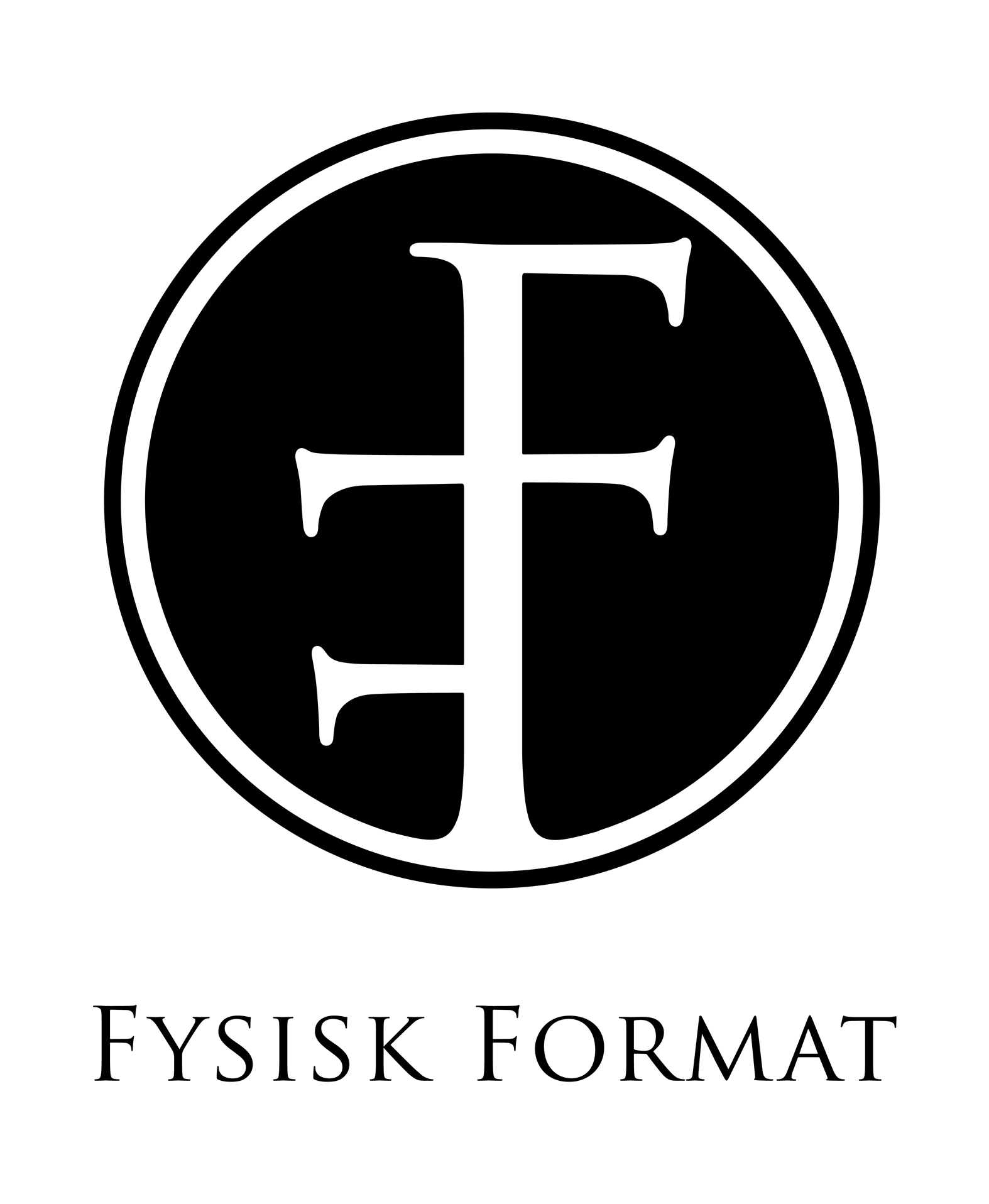
- Founded: 2008
- Founder: Kristian Kallevik
- Distributors: Red Eye Distribution, Cargo Records (UK)
- Genre: punk rock, hardcore punk, metal, indie rock
- Country of origin: Norway
- Location: Oslo
- Official website: http://www.fysiskformat.no

Fysisk Format is a Norwegian record label specialising in the underground music scene of Oslo. The label was created in 2008 by Kristian Kallevik, with members from Okkultokrati, Årabrot, Aristillus (band) and Snöras also working there throughout the years. Fysisk Format has its headquarters in the basement of renowned underground record store Tiger Records in the centre of Oslo. They also distribute records for other labels under the name of Diger.

== Artists ==
- Agenda
- Årabrot
- Aristillus
- Attan
- Beachheads
- Beglomeg
- Bjørn Hatterud
- Black Blood World
- Blood Command
- Conrad Schnitzler
- Daufødt
- Death Is Not Glamorous
- Di Kjipe
- Dominic
- Duvel
- Eskatol
- Frøkedal & Familien
- Furze
- Golden Core
- Haraball
- Haust
- Heave Blood & Die
- Hilma Nikolaisen
- Hope I Die Virgin
- Human Error
- HYMN
- Ieatheartattacks
- Insomniac Bears
- Jagged Vision
- Kaospilot
- Killl
- King Midas
- Knuste Ruter
- Kollwitz (band)
- Korrupt
- Kyrre Bjørkås
- La Casa Fantom
- Le Corbeau (band)
- Leonov
- Livstid
- Manhattan Skyline
- MoE
- Moon Relay
- Misty Range
- NAG
- Nernes/Skagen
- Next Life
- New World Vulture
- Nils Bech
- Obliteration
- Okkultokrati
- Ondt Blod
- PRTLVX
- Pow Pow
- Quiritatio
- Timeworn
- Sex Judas feat. Ricky
- Trist Pike
- SIBIIR
- Silver
- Siste Dagers Helvete
- Snöras
- Spurv
- Svarte Greiner
- The Good the Bad & the Zugly
- Vestindien
