= Monument Bineothan =

Studio album by Benea Reach
- Released: 31 July 2006 (Scandinavia); 20 March 2007 (US)
- Recorded: 2006
- Genre: Extreme metal
- Length: 67:06
- Label: Tabu / Candlelight
- Producers: Rolf Yngve Uggen; Marco Storm

Benea Reach chronology
2004 Pandemonium Demo (2004)	Monument Bineothan (2006)	Alleviat (2008)

Professional ratings
Review scores
Source	Rating
AllMusic	3/5 stars
About.com	3.5/5 stars

Monument Bineothan is the first studio release by Norwegian metalcore/mathcore band Benea Reach. It was released in Europe in July 2006 on Tabu Records. It was released in the U.S. on 20 March 2007 through Candlelight Records. The album was nominated for the 35th annual Spellemannprisen in the Metal category.

Music Videos were recorded for the songs "Inheritor" and "Pandemonium".

== Style ==
The album features a technical and experimental style of extreme metal which contains a diverse blend of metalcore, mathcore, death metal, sludge metal, black metal, doom metal, alternative metal, and avant-garde, and drew comparisons to The Dillinger Escape Plan, Meshuggah, Mastodon, and Tool.

== Track listing ==
All music written and lyrics written by Benea Reach.

1. "Ground Slayer" – 6:56
2. "Inheritor" – 3:25
3. "Transmitter" – 5:24
4. "Purge" – 5:06
5. "Pandemonium" – 4:30
6. "River" – 3:53
7. "Torch" – 4:42
8. "Conflux" – 3:56
9. "Emperor" – 5:59
10. "Immaculate" – 6:10
11. "Venerate" – 12:18
12. "Drapery" – 4:47

== Personnel ==
Benea Reach

- Ilkka Volume – vocals
- Christer Espevoll – guitars, backing vocals on "Inheritor"
- Hakon Sagen – guitars
- Martin Sivertsen – guitars
- Hakon Nakken – bass guitar
- Marco Storm – drums, synthesizer, piano, bass guitar

Other personnel

- Peter Espevoll of Extol – backing vocals on "Inheritor", chorus background vocals on "Emperor"
- Ole Halvard Sveen of Extol, Lengsel, and Mantric – backing vocals on "Inheritor", chorus background vocals on "Emperor"
- Betty Brunick – voice on "Conflux"
- Remi Christiansen – pedal steel guitar on "Drapery"
- Rolf Yngve Uggen – co-production
- Johnny Skalleberg – audio engineering and mixing
- Espen Høydalsvik – audio engineering and mixing

== Notes ==
- The CD booklet was original printed with the wrong pantone color.
- There is not one specific lyricist for the band. Six of the songs' lyrics were provided by Marco Storm. Four of the songs' lyrics were provided by Ilkka Volume. One of the song's lyrics were provided by Christer Espevoll.
