= Tale of a Hero =

2009 video game

- Developer(s): Future Games
- Platform(s): Microsoft Windows
- Release: 2009
- Genre(s): Puzzle, adventure

Tale of a Hero is a fantasy puzzle point-and-click adventure game developed by Czech company Future Games. It was released in 2009. The game uses AGDS Engine. The story was influenced by myths about King Arthur and Beowulf. The game has never been released in English-language markets, but the Italian version includes full English voice acting and an English subtitle patch was later released.

== Plot ==
The game tells the story of Olaf who is a son of the great dragonslayer Halvard. He lives a calm and peaceful life with his friend Alia. That changes when he meets the witch Pripogala. She orders him to kill the snow giant Krugell who just woke up and wants to avenge his brother, who was killed by Olaf's father.

== Characters ==
- Olaf – the main protagonist of the story. His family was expelled from Green Kingdom even though his father was the greatest hero of the kingdom. He lives as a fisherman but dreams to become a hero like his father.
- Alia – Olaf's bride. She is very jealous.
- Pripogala – witch from the swamps and the main antagonist. She is possibly the last living citizen of city Thor.
- Krugell – snow giant and titan. His brother Arioch was killed by Olaf's father. He was forced to make an armistice with Halvard.
- Erea – princess of Green Kingdom. She is a childhood friend of Olaf. She was the only one who defended his family. She became a witch. Pripogala said that Erea was abducted by Krugell.

== Critical reception ==
Gry Online praised the game's subtle, slightly ironic sense of humor. Onet.gry felt the game design was addictive, logical and well-thought out.
