= Manhattan Skyline (band) =

Norwegian mathcore band

- Origin: Oslo, Norway
- Genres: Mathcore, hardcore
- Years active: 2002–present
- Labels: Audio Is a War, Fysisk Format
- Members: Even Bekkedal; Hans Marius Midtgarden; Fredrik Melby; Steffen Sæther-Larsen; Sigurd Mæle

Manhattan Skyline is a Norwegian mathcore band based in Oslo, Norway. They are influenced by metal, hardcore, contemporary music, jazz, fusion and electronica.

After their performance at the 2005 Bodø Hardcore festival, The Faceless Masses website praised them as "one of the fastest and most technical bands in Norway today." After releasing an EP, they began recording a full-length debut album which was intended for an early 2007 release, but due to illness within the band, this release was postponed until 2008.

== History ==
Manhattan Skyline was formed in Oslo in 2002 by drummer Steffen Sæther-Larsen, guitarist Fredrik Melby and vocalist Hans Marius Midtgarden. Subsequently, members of Kaospilot, Slingshot Idol, The Break Quintet, and Next Life joined and left.

In October 2003, they recorded their debut EP, Tarantula Arms, a 3" MCD of seven songs featuring off-time rhythm patterns.

Upon the departure of bassist Anders Braut Simonsen and guitarist Christian Johansen, the band used several part-time bassists while searching for a permanent member. A long search resulted in the selection of Sigurd Mæle.

Jørgen Waag began playing bass with the band and then played guitar for approximately a year before leaving. Following his departure, Even Bekkedal, formerly with In Dialogue With Radiometer, joined the band.

Manhattan Skyline contributed a song called "A) Spitting Milk or B) Swallow or Drown" to React With Protest's Emo Armageddon 7" compilation, which was released in February 2005 and included bands such as Funeral Diner, The Birds Are Spies They Report to the Trees, Suis La Lune, and Catena Collapse.

== Members ==
Current members as of 2007

- Hans Marius Midtgarden - vocals
- Fredrik Melby - guitar
- Even Bekkedal - guitar
- Sigurd Mæle - bass
- Steffen Sæther-Larsen - drums

Former members

- Anders Braut Simonsen - bass
- Jørgen Waag - guitar, bass
- Christian Johansen - guitar
- Hai Nguyen - bass

== Discography ==
Released	Title	Label	Type
October, 2008	Curses	Fysisk Format	Album
October, 2003	Tarantula Arms	Audio Is a War	EP
February 11, 2005	V/A Emo Apocalypse	React With Protest	12" compilation featuring "A) Spitting Milk or B) Swallow or Drown"
