= Next Life (band) =

Norwegian band

Next Life is a Norwegian progressive, electronic- and rock-based band led by guitarist and composer Hai Nguyen Dinh, together with Tormod Christensen on bass and Anders Hangård on drums.

== Biography ==
Formed by Dinh in 1999 in Tønsberg, Norway, their first show was at The Royal Oak (now called Total) in which the band only used an electric guitar, synth and Amiga computer for drums, bass, and melody lines. The sounds derived, and what is partially still called a "chip-instrument", or precisely, the audio-chip of Amiga 1200 and Commodore 64. As Dinh described in many interviews, from early on as a child did he cultivate his love of computer sounds and Commodore 64.

Though broadly classified as electronic, Next Life has self-professed roots in hardcore punk, metal and game music. They mostly cite music from games as their musical influences, along with bands such as Zeni Geva, Dazzling Killmen, Colossamite and Jean Michel Jarre, but combine their very aggressive, visceral sound with typical RPG/science-fiction themes such as digital technology, astrology, and mythology. Through the years the band has involved new contributors. The band has also been noted for use of live visuals in their shows—spastic video projections and an intensive, programmed lightshow.

In 2010, the band toured the UK in support of Canadian composer Owen Pallett (a.k.a. Final Fantasy). In the same year, Next Life provided the opening act for Mayhem in Berlin, Germany.

The band has released their music solely on independent labels; primarily a label spawned from Oslo's oldest independent record store, Fysisk Format. Both the album artwork to Electric Violence (2006) and The Lost Age (2009) is by the Norwegian artist Are Mokkelbost. Next Life's latest album entitled, "Artificial Divinity" was released in Summer 2011 and received good reviews in national papers.

Next Life is currently supported by the Arts Council Norway (Kulturrådet).

== Band members ==
- Hai Nguyen Dinh - guitar, lights, video, audio programming

Past members:

- Tormod Christensen (2000-2017) - synth, vocal
- Christian Augustin (2015–2017) - drums
- Anders Hangård (2008-2013) - drums
- Trond Jensen (2008–2009) - samples, programming
- Katrine Bølstad (2004–2006) - vocal
- Petter Snekkestad (1999–2000) - keyboard
- Unn Fahlstrøm (2002) - video

== Discography ==
=== Albums ===
- 2006: Electric Violence CD released, 14 tracks. Cock Rock Disco, CRD008
- 2009: The Lost Age CD released, 16 tracks. Fysisk Format, FY008
- 2011: Artificial Divinity CD/LP released, 12 tracks. Fysisk Format, FY044

=== EPs and singles ===
- 2000: First demo tape, "Face Cassette". Lobster-Attack, LA000
- 2000: Red End 7" vinyl, 6 tracks. Lobster-Attack, LA001
- 2010: Resurrection CD/split 12" with Haust. Fysisk Format, FY025
- 2012: Year of the Metal Monkey, EP/CD. Norwegianism Records, NOR003

=== Compilations ===
- 2003: Sivil Ulyd 2 CD, Passive Fist Records
- 2004: Yabasta Beats CD, 2002, Yabasta
- 2006: Free Compilation 2006 CD, Cock Rock Disco
- 2008: Free Compilation 2008 CD, Cock Rock Disco
- 2009: Bransjevelter 1, Fysisk Format
- 2010: Bransjevelter 2, Fysisk Format
- 2010: Bransjevelter 3, Fysisk Format

== Other contributions ==
In 2006, Next Life composed the theme for the trailer to computer game, Metal Slug: Mobile Impact.

Dinh has also worked extensively with theatre, set-design and sound installation. In 2010, he toured Europe and China as a performer and composer in Verdensteatret, an avant-garde theatre collective sponsored by the Arts Council Norway, the Norwegian Office for Contemporary Art, and the Norwegian Ministry of Foreign Affairs. Their performance, "And All the Questionmarks Started to Sing", received critical acclaim in Norwegian newspapers. The project is described as, "a composition in the form of a hybrid between performance, concert and installation. A transparent though complex work with an overwhelming richness of details. It might be described as an art-machine played by musicians, performers and robots." In 2011, the company will debut Stateside in New York City's Future Perfect Festival; also coinciding with Next Life's first US tour there.

Anders Hangård has also played drums in Norwegian metal bands NoPlaceToHide and Saprophyth.
