= Maria Solheim =

Norwegian singer-songwriter (born 1982)

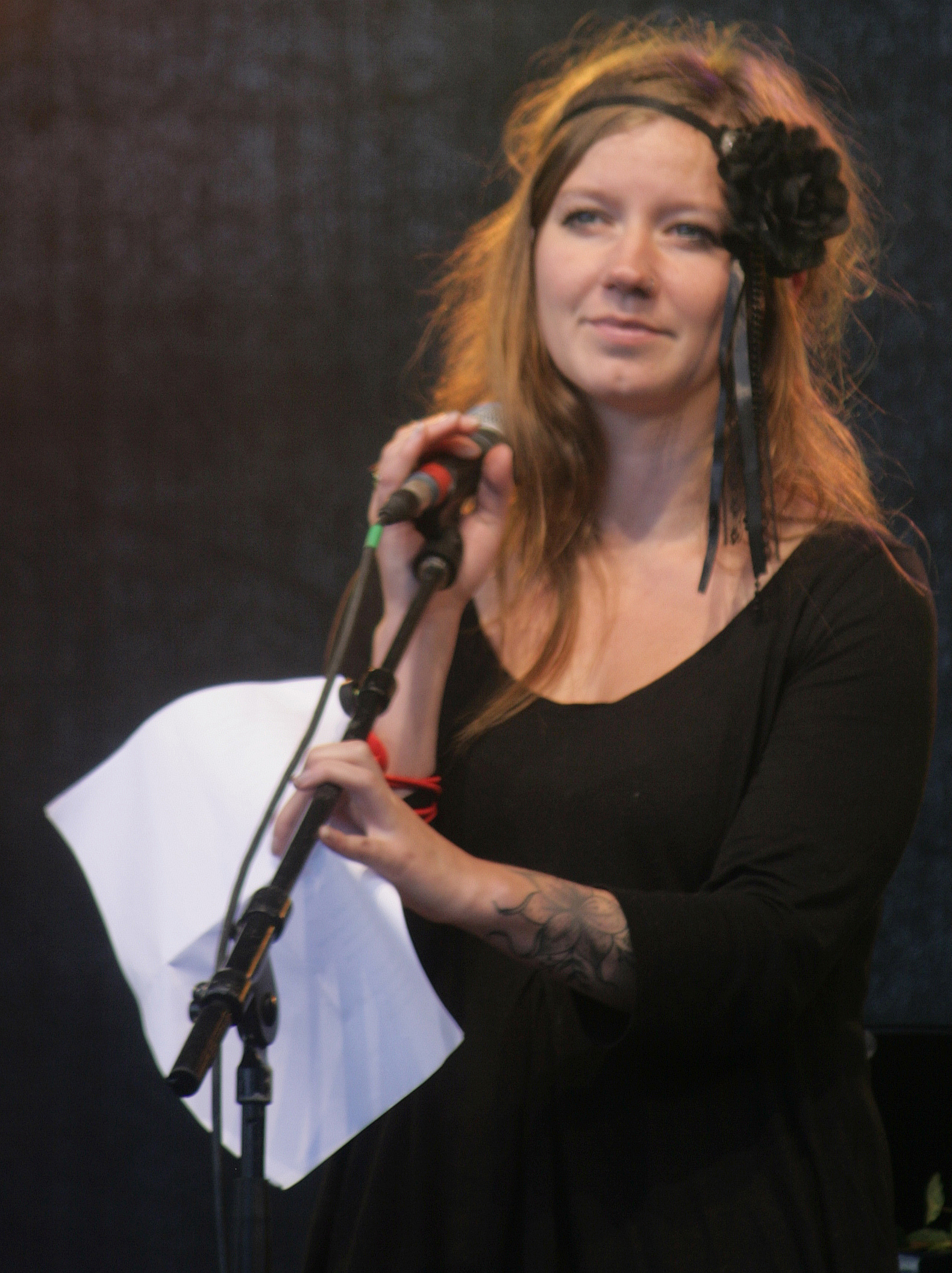
- Maria Solheim, 2011

Background information
- Born: 19 January 1982 (age 43); Alsvåg, Øksnes, Vesterålen
- Origin: Norway
- Genres: Pop, folk, rock
- Occupation: Singer-songwriter
- Instrument(s): Vocals, guitar
- Years active: 1999–present
- Labels: Universal Music, Kirkelig Kulturverksted
- Website: mariasolheim.no

Maria Solheim (born 19 January 1982 in Alsvåg, Øksnes Municipality, Vesterålen) is a Norwegian singer-songwriter. She was discovered at 15 years old, by a travelling musician, singing her own songs in a small fishing village. She has released 7 solo albums.

== Career ==
Solheim signed her first record deal with the label Kirkelig Kulturverksted in 1999 at the age of 17, and her first album was released two years later. She frequently tours Norway and Germany. Her music was featured at the 'Grateful Sound' event in the anime adaptation of the manga series BECK.

In 2006 Solheim chose to withdraw from the limelight for a period, getting married and having a daughter. Then in 2009, she had a joint No. 1 hit alongside Hans Erik Dyvik Husby in the Norwegian Singles Chart with "Rom for alle". The song stayed at No. 1 for 3 weeks including the Christmas chart for 2009.

After the horrific bomb attack in Oslo and massacre at Utøya on 22 July 2011, Solheim was a part of the «Rosetogmarkeringen», in Oslo singing «Mitt lille land» and «Barn av regnbuen».

She released her fifth solo album In The Deep in 2012. Solheim participated in Melodi Grand Prix 2021 with the song "Nordlyset".

== Discography ==
=== Solo albums ===
- 2001: Barefoot (Kirkelig Kulturverksted)
- 2002: Behind Closed Doors (Kirkelig Kulturverksted)
- 2004: Frail (Kirkelig Kulturverksted)
- 2006: Will There Be Spring (Kirkelig Kulturverksted)
- 2012: In The Deep (MBN / Universal)
- 2018: Stories Of New Mornings (Kirkelig Kulturverksted)
- 2021: The Bird Has Flown (Kirkelig Kulturverksted)

=== Singles ===
- 2007: Wildest Day (Strange Ways Records)
- 2009: Rom for alle (a duo with Hans Erik Dyvik Husby)

=== With other artists ===
- 2011: Mitt lille land (Sony Music)

== Appears on ==
- 2002: Bagateller (Folk & Røvere)
- 2002: Stolpesko (Various artists)
- 2003: Paradigms (Extol)
- 2003: Salmer for Gud og hvermann (Various artists)
- 2004: Kind Of Cold (Meister)
- 2005: On a Bridge Between Clouds (Mujaji)
- 2008: Alleviat (Benea Reach)
- 2013: Aura (Benea Reach)
