= Human Error =

Human Error may refer to:

- Human error, not intended, not desired, or that led the task or system outside its acceptable limits

== Film and television ==
- Human Error (film), a 2004 American film
- Human Error (TV series), a 2024 Australian crime drama
- "Human Error" (House), a 2007 TV episode
- "Human Error" (Star Trek: Voyager), a 2001 TV episode

== Literature ==
- Human Error, a 1985 novel by Paul Preuss
- Human Error, a 1990 nonfiction book by James Reason
- Human Error, a 2026 YA novel and book series by J.J. Oates

== Music ==
- Human Error (musician) (Rafał Kuczynski, born 1982), Polish electronic musician
- Human Error (punk rock band), a Swedish band
- Human Error (album), by Unseen Terror, or the title song, 1987
- Human Error: Ways to Selfdestruction, an album by Crionics, 2002
- "Human Error" (song), by Oh Land, 2019
- "Human Error", a song by the Datsuns from Headstunts, 2008
- "Human Error", a song by Droideka, 2013
- "Human Error", a song by Viagra Boys from Cave World, 2022

== See also ==
- Human error assessment and reduction technique
