= Kjetil Steensnæs =

Norwegian musician

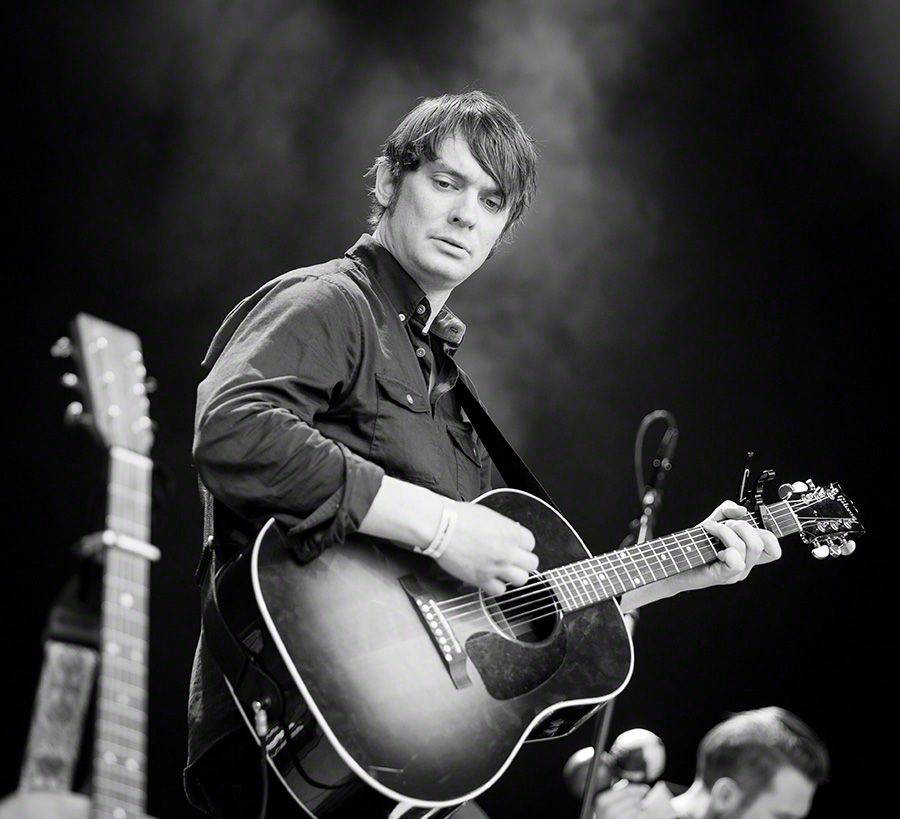
- Kjetil Steensnæs performs with 'Die with Your Boots On' at Piknik i Parken in Oslo on 24. June 2016.

Background information
- Born: 17 April 1976 (age 50); Haugesund, Rogaland
- Origin: Norway
- Genres: Jazz
- Occupation: Musician
- Instruments: Guitar, dobro, pedal steel guitar, banjo

Kjetil Steensnæs (born 17 April 1976, in Haugesund, Norway) is a Norwegian musician (handling various string instruments, such as guitar, dobro, pedal steel guitar and banjo) known from a number of collaborations with musicians like Rita Eriksen, Maria Mena, Beady Belle, Morten Harket, Herborg Kråkevik, Sissel Kyrkjebø, Maria Solheim, Thomas Dybdahl, Sigvart Dagsland, Kari Bremnes, Anja Garbarek, Bjørn Eidsvåg, The Cardigans, Torun Eriksen, Unni Wilhelmsen, William Hut and Tom Roger Aadland.

== Career ==
Steensnæs is a highly demanded musician, and has collaborated with many of the greatest Norwegian artists like Morten Harket, Thomas Dybdahl, Sissel Kyrkjebø, Maria Mena and Bjørn Eidsvåg to mention but a few. His musical roots are based in American rock and folk music, and he has explored bluegrass and related genres in several ensembles, including the trio Darling West.

He alsoruns the record company 'Grand Slam Happy Time' in Oslo.

== Discography ==
=== The Holstein United Bluegrass Boys ===
- 2007: The Brightest Morning (Grand Slam Happy Time)
- 2009: Cattle Tracks (Grand Slam Happy Time)

=== Other collaborations ===
- 2001: Talkin' Talk, with D'Sound
- 2002: Behind Closed Doors (Kirkelig Kulturverksted), with Maria Solheim
- 2003: Glittercard, with Torun Eriksen
- 2003: Såret Fugl
- 2003: Jake Ziah EP, with Jake Ziah
- 2004: Vanilla Kiss, with Silje Hrafa
- 2004: These Days Do You No Justice, with Jake Ziah
- 2004: Frail (Kirkelig Kulturverksted), with Maria Solheim
- 2004: Mellow, with Maria Mena
- 2005: Briefly Shaking (EMI Music, Norway), with Anja Garbarek
- 2005: On Every Corner, with Kjetil Fredriksen
- 2005: When Worlds Collide, with Paperboys
- 2005: Last Days And Nights, with Simone
- 2005: Mitt Hjerte Alltid Vanker, with Mosaic
- 2006: Bridges Or Walls, with Jan Groth
- 2006: Fagert Er Landet, with Solveig Leithaug
- 2006: This Is Life, with Anette Vedvik
- 2006: Elisabeth Yndestad EP, with Elisabeth Yndestad
- 2006: Spesiell, with Bjørn-Peder Johansen
- 2006: Bedehusland Country – Sanger Fra Bedehusland 8
- 2007: Sanger Fra T.B. Barratts Salmebok, with Jan Groth
- 2007: Et Rom I Huset (Kirkelig Kulturverksted), with Sigvart Dagsland
- 2007: Vengespenn, with Sølvi Helen Hopland
- 2007: Forandring (Kirkelig Kulturverksted), with Sigvart Dagsland
- 2008: Great White (Park Grammofon), with Sarah Nebel (Elisabeth Endresen b. 1967)
- 2008: The Good Or Better Side of Things (Kirkelig Kulturverksted), with Garness
- 2008: Letter from Egypt (Polydor), with Morten Harket
- 2008: Cause and Effect (Columbia/Live Nation), Maria Mena
- 2009: Andagassi, with Ann Mari Andersen
- 2009: Thank You, with Safari
- 2009: Sørg Ei For Dager Som Kommer, with Øyslebø Sangsøstre
- 2009: I Know (Eccentric Music/Universal Music Group), with Tone Damli Aaberge
- 2009: Too Damn Late, with Kjetil Fredriksen
- 2009: Deg, with Ole Reinlund
- 2009: This Gig Almost Got Me Killed, with Ovidiu Cernăuțeanu
- 2010: Barnas Supershow – Hytta Vår
- 2010: Til Skogen, with Bergen Mandolinband
- 2010: Beste Fra Bedehusland
- 2010: Honestly, with Cecilie Duus
- 2010: Passage (Jazzland), with Torun Eriksen
- 2010: Mrs. Robinson's Pantry, with Sigrun and the Kitchen Band
- 2010: Rett Hjem – Country Gospel, with Martin Alfsen and Reflex
- 2010: Toner Fra Bedehusland – Salmer Og Sanger I Instrumentalutgaver
- 2010: Til Deg, with Sissel Kyrkjebø
- 2010: Seeds of Joy, with Trine Rein
- 2010: Sigvart Dagslands Bryllups- og Begravelsesorkester (Kirkelig Kulturverksted), with Sigvart Dagsland
- 2011: Det Du Aldri Sa, with Tom Roger Aadland
- 2011: Ryktet, with Trang fødsel
- 2012: Looking-back (Eccentric Music/Sony Music), with Tone Damli Aaberge
- 2012: Jeg Har Vel Ingen Kjærere (Plush Badger Music), with Anne Gravir Klykken
- 2012: Fløyel Og Stål, with Tom Roger Aadland
- 2013: Ikke Gi Deg, Jente! (HK Productions), with Hanne Krogh

== Eksterne lenker ==
- Media related to Kjetil Steensnæs at Wikimedia Commons
- Groove.no – Kjetil Steensnæs
