= Human Error (punk rock band) =

Swedish punk rock band

Human Error is a Swedish Punk rock band.

== History ==
Human Error was formed in Stockholm the summer of 1994 by guitarist Magnus Hjort and singer Jim Farula with bassist Per Gradén. In the fall of 1994 they tried various drummers and guitarists. For one short period they even tried to play rap metal. Early 1995, though, they were joined by drummer Lutten Larsson and guitarist Mats Larsson both formerly with Stockholms Negrer. Mats Larson also played in the revival line up of the legendary Swedish punk band KSMB.

The musical direction was also clearer now and could be described as high energy punk rock with noise and melodies. Late in 1995 Human Error signed a publishing deal with Sweden Music and also hooked up with Birdnest Records. By that time Lutten Larson had left the band being replaced by Anton Olemyr whose previous bands included early punkers Revolt and Irish styled outfit Bang The Drum.

1996 saw Human Error recording and releasing their debut album Pain, produced by Johan Johansson and also playing some live dates in Stockholm and Köping. A couple of members of Human Error also appeared in the Swedish spaghetti western The Return of Jesus Part II, and the band contributed one song for the soundtrack.

In 1997 Human Error, together with Bates Motel, embarked on the first ever club level tour in St. Petersburg by a western band. Early 1998 Human Error were back in Russia. This time to play in Moscow and also to headline the 7th Grand Freak Show in Bryansk. The gig in Bryansk was also the first in that city by a western act. Mats Larson left the band in 1998 and was replaced by Jocke Nilsson, who also plays guitar in The Pushers. In 1999 the band was back in Russia to do gigs in Moscow, St. Petersburg and Bryansk, once again to headline the Grand Freak Show.

Their second album, No One Ever Said It Was Easy, was released in 2017.

== Current line up ==
- Jim Farula (vocals)
- Per Gradén (bass guitar)
- Magnus Hjort (guitar)
- Jocke Nilsson (guitar)
- Tobias Bertell (drums)

== Discography ==
=== Albums ===
- Pain (1996)
- Pain RE: Visited (2017)
- No One Ever Said It Was Easy (2017)

=== Compilation albums ===
- Definitivt 50 spänn 5 (Understand) (1996)
- The Return Of Jesus Part II (soundtrack) (Lesson) (1997)

=== DVD ===
- Definitivt Birdnest Dvd Part 1 (2004)
