= Next Life =

2007 video game

- Developer: Future Games
- Publisher: The Adventure Company
- Engine: OGRE
- Platform: Windows
- Release: NA: November 20, 2007
- Mode: Single-player

Next Life (Czech: Reprobates) is an adventure game developed by Czech company Future Games and published by The Adventure Company designed for Microsoft Windows-based computers. The game engine is OGRE.

== Premise ==
The main character Adam Reichl possibly dies in a car accident and wakes up on unknown island in the middle of nowhere. He starts to explore and tries to find out where he is, only to find that there are other people in the island seemingly from different time periods.

== Reception ==
Reception

Aggregate score
Aggregator	Score
Metacritic	56/100

Review scores
Publication	Score
GameSpot	4.5/10
GameZone	6.0/10
IGN	4.5/10

Next Life received mixed to negative reviews from critics. On Metacritic, the game received a score of 56/100 based on 13 reviews, indicating "mixed or average reviews".
