= Serena-Maneesh =

Norwegian alternative rock band

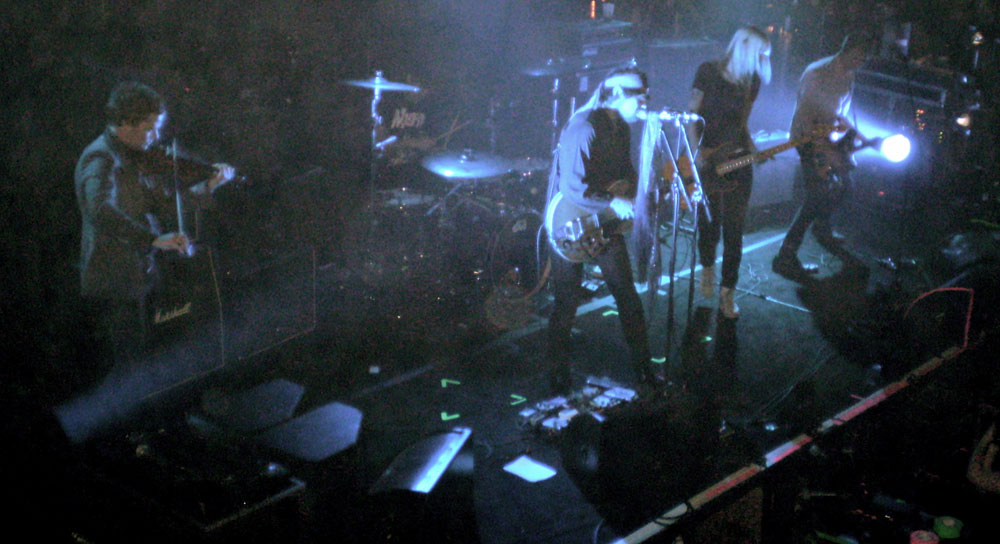
- Serena-Maneesh performing in Australia in 2007. From left: Eivind Schou, Einar Lukerstuen, Emil Nikolaisen, Hilma Nikolaisen, Øystein Sandsdalen

Background information
- Origin: Egersund, Norway
- Genres: Alternative rock, shoegaze, indie rock, noise pop
- Years active: 1999–2010 (hiatus)
- Labels: 4AD, Smalltown Supersound, HoneyMilk, Hype City, Playlouder, Low Transit Industries
- Members: Emil Nikolaisen
- Past members: Full list
- Website: www.serena-maneesh.com/

Serena-Maneesh (previously spelled Serena Maneesh, sometimes shortened to S-M) is a Norwegian alternative rock rock band formed in Egersund in 1999. The band is led by founder and multi-instrumentalist Emil Nikolaisen and has had several different musicians contribute to studio recordings and live performances. Serena-Maneesh released two studio albums before going on hiatus in 2010.

== History ==
The team of musicians who each contribute to the band's sound is organized around frontman and songwriter Emil Nikolaisen. Important sources of musical inspiration have been The Velvet Underground, The Stooges, AC/DC, Amon Düül, Gainsbourg/ Vannier, many greats of bossanova and anything beyond. In late 2005, the band toured Europe in support of The Dandy Warhols. In early 2006, Serena-Maneesh opened for British band Oasis during its UK tour. The band supported Nine Inch Nails on the Australia/Japan leg of their 2007 world tour.

Serena-Maneesh's self-titled debut album was released on the Norwegian record-label HoneyMilk in the autumn of 2005. In December of that same year, the Norwegian vinyl label Hype City released an LP print featuring two exclusive tracks. In March 2006, the band announced its transfer to the Playlouder branch of the Beggars Group established in Europe, North America and Oceania. In June 2006, the band released an international edition of their self-titled album through Playlouder.

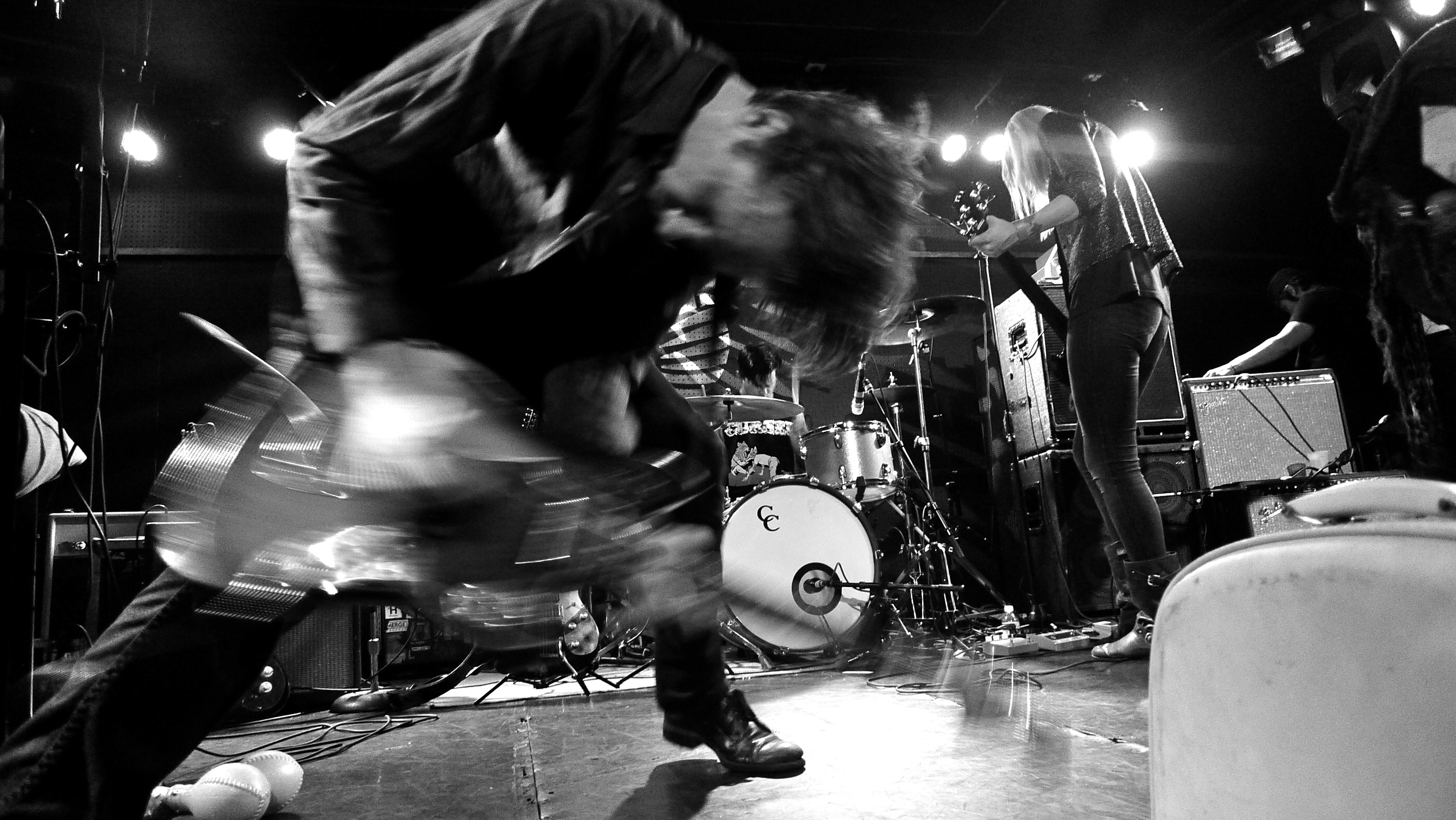
Serena Maneesh performing live in 2010

The band's sophomore album, Serena Maneesh 2: Abyss in B Minor, was released in March 2010 on the British independent label 4AD. Following tours of Europe and North America in support of the album, the band went on hiatus later that year. (Note: The band's Facebook page description lists them as being in "Hibernation since 2010.") In 2013, frontman and songwriter Nikolaisen stated that he had started working on a new album, but it has remained unreleased.

== Band members ==
=== Final lineup ===
- Emil Nikolaisen – vocals, guitar
- Øystein Sandsdalen – guitar
- Hilma Nikolaisen – bass
- Ådne Meisfjord – electronics
- Tommy Akerholdt – drums

=== Former members and live personnel ===
- Elvira Nikolaisen – vocals
- Lina Holmstrøm – vocals, bass, organ
- Sondre T. Midttun – guitar
- Ann Sung-an Lee – organ, percussion, vocals
- Marco Storm – drums
- Håvard Krogedal – bass, organ
- Eivind Schou – violin
- Einar Lukerstuen – drums
- Anders Møller – drums

== Discography ==
=== Studio albums ===
- Serena Maneesh (2005)
- Serena Maneesh 2: Abyss in B Minor (2010)

=== EPs ===
- Fixxations (2002)
- Zurück: Retrospectives 1999-2003 (2005)
