= Emil Nikolaisen =

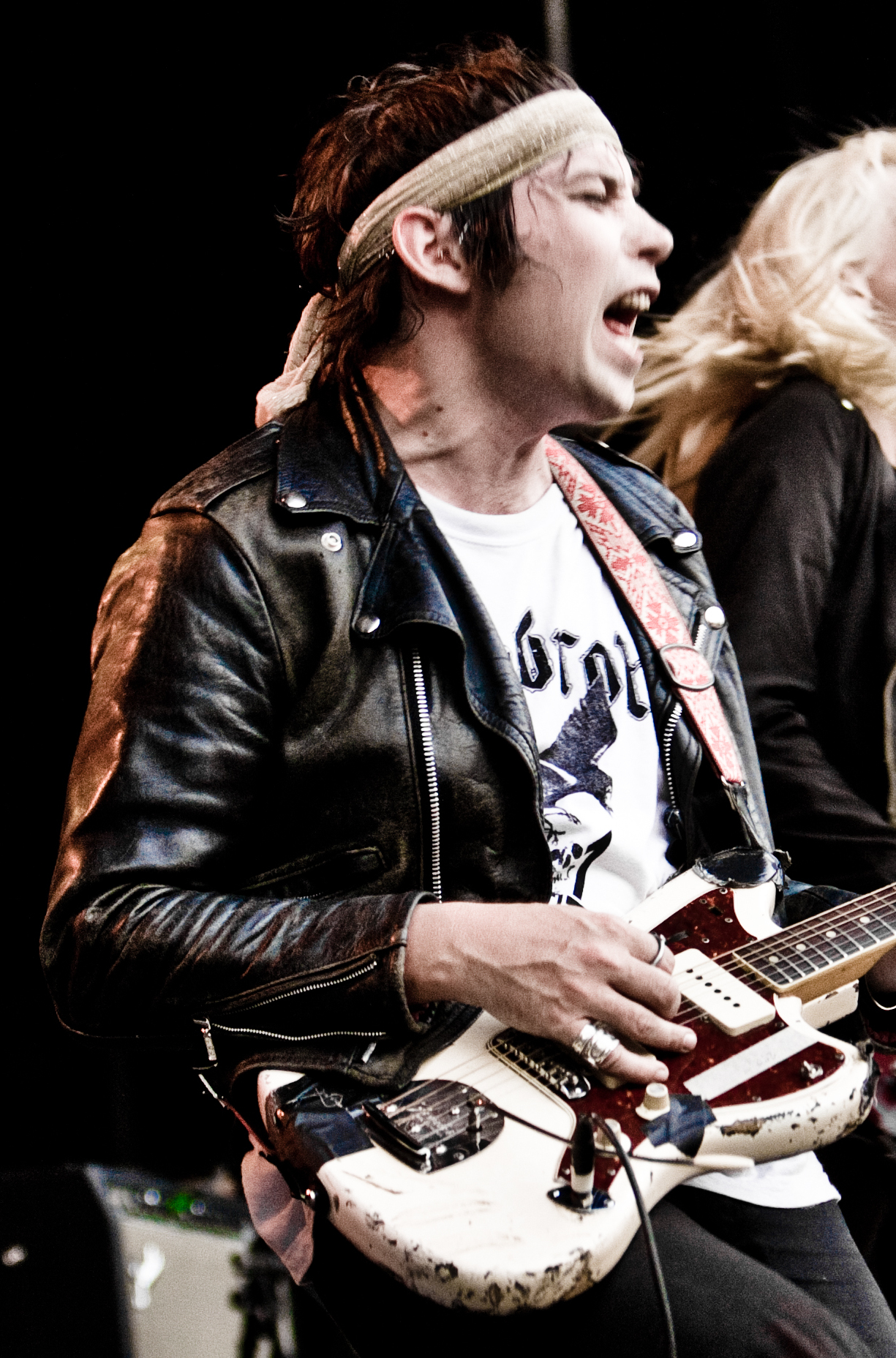
- Nikolaisen performing with Serena-Maneesh in 2010.

Background information
- Also known as: Katz, Rattlesnake, Melchior
- Born: 4 February 1977 (age 49); Moi, Norway
- Genres: Extreme metal, glam punk, indie pop, indie rock, jangle pop, noise pop, noise rock, shoegazing
- Occupations: Musician, singer, record producer, recording engineer
- Instruments: Vocals, guitar, drums, percussion, bass, keyboards
- Years active: 1995-present
- Labels: 4AD, Playlouder, Smalltown Supersound, Honey Milk, Perfect Pop, Tooth & Nail, Bad Afro
- Member of: Serena-Maneesh
- Formerly of: Silver; The Loch Ness Mouse; Royal; Extol; Animal Town

Emil Nikolaisen (born 4 February 1977) is a Norwegian musician, record producer and recording engineer. He's best known as the frontman and songwriter of alternative rock band Serena-Maneesh and former drummer of punk rock band Silver. Nikolaisen was previously the drummer of pop group The Loch Ness Mouse, guitarist and songwriter for indie rock band Royal, and guitarist for metal band Extol.

As a producer, engineer and guest musician, Nikolaisen has worked with The Brian Jonestown Massacre, Madrugada, Årabrot, Carmen Villain, Elvira Nikolaisen, Maria Solheim, Wovenhand and A Place To Bury Strangers.

== Selected discography ==
=== With Serena-Maneesh ===
Studio albums

- Serena Maneesh (2005)
- Serena Maneesh 2: Abyss in B Minor (2010)

Studio EPs

- Fixxations (2002)
- Zurück: Retrospectives 1999-2003 (2005)

=== With Silver ===
Studio albums

- White Diary (2004)

Studio EPs

- Billboard Blackout (2000)
- Riot 1-2-3 (2001)

=== With The Loch Ness Mouse ===
Studio albums

- Flair For Darjeeling (1999)
- Key West (2002)
- Cargo (An Introduction To The Loch Ness Mouse) (2004)
- 11-22 (2005)

Studio EPs

- Ceylon Sailor EP (2000)

=== With Royal ===
- My Dear (1998)

=== With Todd Rundgren, Emil Nikolaisen and Hans-Peter Lindstrøm ===
- Runddans (2015)
