= C. M. Seehuus =

Norwegian Pentecostal pastor (1864–1951)

Carl Magnus Seehuus
- Born: 20 May 1864; Kristiansund, Norway
- Died: 4 April 1951 (aged 86); Skien, Norway
- Occupation: Pastor
- Movement: Pentecostal
- Spouse: Inga Johanne Aasen (died 1890) Ida Berthea Hanson
- Children: Esther Karoline Elisabeth Seehuus; Inga Marie Seehuus; Carl Rein Seehuus; Aida Margaret Seehuus

Carl Magnus Seehuus, commonly known as C.M. Seehuus (20 May 1864 – 4 April 1951) was a pioneering Norwegian Pentecostal pastor. Seehuus was initially a Baptist pastor of the Baptist church in Skien, Telemark, Norway. He later broke away from the Baptists and founded a new church, Pinsekirken Tabernaklet Skien, which became the first Pentecostal congregation in Norway and the Nordic countries.

== Life, beliefs, education, and work ==
Carl Magnus Seehuus was born 20 May 1864 in Kristiansund, Norway. As a 16-year-old, Seehuus became a Baptist and was baptized. He later studied at Baptist Union Theological Seminary in Morgan Park, Chicago from 1885 to 1888. In Norway he was employed as a travel secretary in the Norwegian Sunday School Union (Norsk Søndagsskoleunion, today called the Frikirkelig Barne- og Ungdomsunion) where he worked from Kristiania, now Oslo, and Moss.

Seehuus came to Skien in 1895, where he became pastor of Norway's first Baptist church, which later became known as Skien Baptist Church (Skien baptistmenighet), in 1899.

In the early 1900s, the Christian revival in Wales was at a peak. Building on the earlier dissenter revival in the Skien area sparked by Gustav Adolph Lammers and inspired by the Welsh revival, a revival began in Norway, including Skien, in 1905. Some of the church's members began to speak in tongues, a new and unknown phenomenon. Seehuus' wife also began to speak in tongues while in private prayer. Many were skeptical, including Seehuus himself initially. After reading the supernatural reports of Norwegian-British Pentecostal pioneer Thomas Ball Barratt and studying the Bible, he was convinced otherwise. Seehuus addressed the topic at a meeting on 10 March 1907. The notes from the meeting stated, "never before has a more serious issue been addressed and at the same time a strongly awakening movement; for us a new direction of the Spirit has manifested, which in connection with a visible filling of the Spirit, is a phenomenon like in the 14th chapter of Paul's letter to the Corinthians describing speaking in tongues, about which the congregation has had differing opinions." There was a divide in the church over the issue and there were suggestions to forbid speaking in tongues.

=== Church split ===
On 27 January 1908, Seehuus gave his resignation, to take effect on 1 February. His reasoning was stated to be "a disagreement between him and a number of church staff and members regarding the spiritual gifts and their use in the service." The Seehuus family and approximately 25 other people left Skien Baptist Church. On 14 April 1908, Seehuus founded a new church in Skien, Menigheten i Totalen; it was later renamed Tabernaklet ('the Tabernacle') and is now known as Pinsekirken Tabernaklet Skien. It was the first church in what was to become the Norwegian Pentecostal movement.

=== Family ===
Seehuus' first wife Inga Johanne Aasen, with whom he had daughter Esther Karoline Elisabeth, died when their daughter was young. He later married Ida Berthea Hanson, who was born in 1868 in Concord, Wisconsin, USA, and died in 1928 in Skien; she was baptized in a Baptist church in Oconomowoc, Wisconsin, as a teenager. Together they had daughters Inga Marie Hansen née Seehuus and Aida Margaret Seehuus, as well as son Carl Rein Seehuus (1900–1975). Carl Rein was also a well-known pastor in the Norwegian Pentecostal movement, speaking at the Filadelfia Oslo church at 12 years of age and later leading the church Pinsekirken Tabernaklet Bergen.

Seehuus died 4 April 1951 in Skien.

== See also ==
- Pentecostalism in Norway
- Baptist Union of Norway
- Erik Andersen Nordquelle, another early Norwegian Pentecostal figure
- Aage Samuelsen, a pastor who split from Tabernaklet Skien and started the charismatic movement Maran Ata in the 1950s
