= Ole Børud discography =

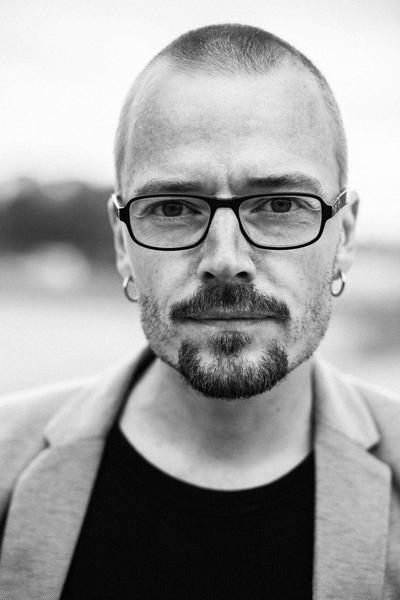
- Studio albums: 8
- EPs: 2
- Live albums: 1
- Compilation albums: 5
- Singles: 20
- Music videos: 4
- Guest appearances: 11
- Compilation contributions: 9
- Additional appearances: 2
- Video EPs: 1

The discography of Ole Børud, a singer, songwriter, and multi-instrumentalist from Hamar, Norway, consists of eight studio albums, including one collaborative album, an EP, five compilation albums, five of which were collaborative, a collaborative EP, twenty singles, including four collaborative singles and eight as a featured artist, eleven additional guest appearances, nine contributions to compilation albums, a live video album as a featured performer, a video EP as a featured performer, two additional song appearances, a music video, one collaborative music video, and two music videos as a featured performer. The son of gospel singer Arnold Børud, Ole began a career in music at age five as a member of the family musical group Arnold B. Family, a group which would participate in the Melodi Grand Prix three times. In 1988 at age twelve, Børud released a studio album of Christian children's music, Alle Skal Få Vite Det!. In the mid- and late-1990s, Børud forayed into heavy metal music: He co-founded the death-doom project Schaliach in 1995 before joining the progressive death metal band Extol in 1996.

In 2002, he released a studio album as a solo artist, Chi Rho, in which he performed covers of hit songs by various Christian contemporary musicians. In 2008, Børud released Shakin' the Ground, a studio album in which he established a West Coast style that he has continued on subsequent albums. Børud considers Shakin' the Ground his true debut as a solo performer as his previous release was entirely of unoriginal music. The same year, he collaborated with Kåre Conradi and Ingelin Reigstad Norheim along with girls from the Jeløy Church's Children's and Youth Choirs to release Takk, gode Gud, for alle ting: 20 sanger fra Barnesalmeboka, a compilation album of 20 hymns. In 2009, he recorded a cover of Chaka Khan's "Through the Fire" for the compilation album Fly Away – Songs of David Foster.

In 2011, he released Keep Movin, which peaked at no. 27 on the Norwegian charts and no. 15 on the Swedish charts. That same year, he performed live with Santa Fe and the Fat City Horns, a concert which was later released on DVD in 2013. In 2013, he collaborated with Samuel Ljungblahd on a Christmas album, Someday at Christmas. The album charted at no. 39 in Norway and no. 13 in Sweden. That year Børud also released a best-of compilation, The Best. His next studio release was Stepping Up, released on 24 November 2014.

On 18 January 2019, Trine Rein featured Børud on her single "Where Do We Go". His seventh studio album, Outside the Limit, was released on 20 September 2019. Børud also was featured as a vocalist and guitarist on the progressive death metal band Cognizance's single "Malignant Domain", released 22 August 2019. On 22 November 2019, he appeared, in collaboration with Lewi Bergrud and Maria Solheim, on the Christmas EP Blåtoner. The next year the same trio recorded a music video performing the hymn "En krybbe var vuggen" ("Away in a Manger") and a single, "Julefred", the latter featuring Frøydis Grorud. On 13 April 2020, Børud was featured along with Kine L. Fossheim on the single and music video "Together We Stand". The song was released by Gospel Explosion, a choral project led by Leif Ingvald Skaug. As a result of the COVID-19 pandemic, Leif began holding online choir rehearsals, in which individuals from 70 different countries participated. Many of these choral members then collaborated from around the world to create the song. On 27 June 2020, Børud accompanied Ander Buaas on "Alfr. Andersen" from Buass' album Larvik Improvisations. In 2021, he featured on the Sullen song "Skylines" from the album Nodus Tollens Act I: Oblivion. Børud's eighth studio album, Soul Letters, was released on 11 February 2022. On 21 April 2023, he guest featured on the song and accompanying music video for "Mouthless Embassy" by Kallias. In December 2023, he guest featured on A Hill to Die Upon's rendition of "What Child Is This?" on their Christmas album The Black Nativity. A second EP of his, Revisited Sessions, was released on 10 May 2024.

== Studio albums ==
List of studio albums, with selected chart positions
Title	Details	Peak chart positions	
Title	Details	NOR	SWE
Alle Skal Få Vite Det!	January 1988; Tvers	—	—
Chi Rho	Released: 15 May 2002; Label: Master	—	—
Shakin' the Ground	Released: 5 February 2008; Label: Connection	—	—
Keep Movin	Released: 7 September 2011; Label: Village Again	27	15
Someday at Christmas (with Samuel Ljungblahd)	Released: 23 December 2013; Label: Connection	39	13
Stepping Up	Released: 24 November 2014; Label: Connection	—	—
Outside the Limit	Released: 20 September 2019; Label: Connection	—	—
Soul Letters	Released: 11 February 2022; Label: Connection	—	—
"—" denotes a recording that did not chart.

== Extended plays ==
List of extended plays with selected details
Title	Details
Blåtoner (with Lewi Bergrud and Maria Solheim)	Released: 22 November 2019; Label: Grammofon; Format: X
Revisited Sessions	Released: 10 May 2024; Label: Connection; Format: X

=== Video extended plays ===
List of video extended plays with selected details
Title	Details
Pages Special (featuring Ole Børud)	Released: 27 June 2021; Creator: Songs I Want to Play; Title: 19 - "The Music of Pages"

== Compilation albums ==
List of compilation albums with selected details
Title	Details
Den Fyrste Song (with Iselin Alme, Trond Kjelsås, Silje Husan, Maj Britt Andersen, Tripp Trapp Koret, Rasmus Høgset, Inga Marie Hansen, Rita Kjelsås, Live Husan, and Anne Kjersti Hansen)	Released: 2002; Label: IKO-Forlaget
Sanger Fra Jesusfolket (with Arnold Børud, Jan Groth, Frisk Luft, Knut Anders Sørum, and Stina Helgestad)	Released: 2002; Label: Master
Takk, gode Gud, for alle ting: 20 sanger fra Barnesalmeboka (with Kåre Conradi and Ingelin Reigstad Norheim)	Released: 2008; Label: IKO-Forlaget
Søndagsskolen Synger (with Ann Kristin Wenneberg, Marianne Bondevik, Hans Esben Gihle, and Voxkids)	Released: 2008; Label: Grammofon
The Best	Released: 2013; Label: Village Again

== Live albums ==
List of live video albums with selected details
Title	Details
Live with Ole Børud (with Santa Fe and the Fat City Horns)	Released: 2013; Label: Strokeland

== Compilation singles ==
List of compilation singles with selected details
Title	Year	Album
"Takk, Gode Gud, For Hjem Og Brød" (with Iselin Alme and Trond Brænne)	1987	Takk, Min Gud, For Hele Meg
"Jesus, du er glad i meg"	1994	Nå lukker seg mitt øye
"Lovsyng Herren, han er nær" (with Bård Bratlie, Kåre Conradi, Heine Fagervik, Ingeborg Hansen-Bauer, Geir Hegerstrøm, Ingelin Reigstad Nordheim, and Anine Kruse Skatrud)	1998	Hvem har skapt alle Blomstene?
"Through the Fire" (cover version)	2009	Fly Away – The Songs of David Foster
"Måne og sol"	2011	Alle synger Takk!
"Vi synger med takk og glede"	2011	Alle synger Lyset
"Kjærligheten Seirer"	2011	Kjærligheten Seirer
"Here I Am to Worship"	2014	Adoremus
"Breathe"	2014	Adoremus

== Singles ==
=== As primary artist ===
List of singles as a primary artist with year released, selected peak chart positions and album
Title	Year	Peak chart positions	Album
Title	Year	JPN Over.	Album
"She's Like No Other"	2011	—	Keep Movin'
"Mary's Boy Child" (with Samuel Ljungblahd)	2013	—	Non-album single
"Maybe"	2014	—	Stepping Up
"O Holy Night" (with Samuel Ljungblahd)	2017	—	Non-album single
"Good Time"	2018	—	Outside the Limit
"Fast Enough"	2019	—	Outside the Limit
"Outside the Limit"	2019	—	Outside the Limit
"Julefred" (with Maria Solheim and Lewi Bergrud featuring Frøydis Grorud)	2020	—	Non-album single
"Just for a Little While"	2021	—	Soul Letters
"At My Best"	2021	—	Soul Letters
"Love Remedy"	2022	—	Soul Letters
"Find a Way" (featuring Bill Champlin, Michael Omartian, and Jay Graydon)	2023	—	Non-album single
"Keep Movin (Revisited)"	2024	—	Revisited Sessions
"Sleepwalking Again"	2025	6	Non-album single

=== As a featured artist ===
List of singles as a featured artist with year released and album
Title	Year	Album
"The Mission Field" (Joakim Arenius and Praise Unit featuring Samuel Ljungblahd, Ole Børud, and Miriam Gardner)	2009	The Mission Field
"Barrytown" (Waverform Five Mix) (Lars-Erik Dahle featuring Ole Børud)	2017	Non-album singles
"Where Do We Go" (Trine Rein featuring Ole Børud)	2019	Non-album singles
"Malignant Domain" (Cognizance featuring Ole Børud)	2019	Malignant Domain
"Together We Stand" (Gospel Explosion featuring Kine and Ole Børud)	2020	Non-album singles
"Mouthless Embassy" (Kallias featuring Ole Børud)	2023	Non-album singles
"We Are Here" (Hans Christian Jochimsen featuring Ole Børud	2024	Non-album singles

== Guest appearances ==
List of non-single guest appearances with year released, other artist(s) featured, and album name
Title	Year	Other artist(s)	Album
"Alle Kan Hjelpe Noen"	2009	Linda Børud	Linda Børud Synger Med Barn
"Live and Move"	2011	Krik	I Alt
"Get Ready"	2012	INC the Choir	Higher
"Barrytown"	2013	Lars-Erik Dahle	Step into the Water
"All Shook Up"	2013	Rune Larson, Arnold Børud	Tidens Gate
"Rain Checks"	2016	The Loch Ness Mouse	The Loch Ness Mouse
"Rosetta"	2019	Umpfel	As the Waters Cover the Sea
"Are You Real?"	2020	Tomi Malm	Coming Home
"Skylines"	2021	Sullen	Nodus Tollens Act I: Oblivion
"What Child Is This?"	2023	A Hill to Die Upon	The Black Nativity
"Tomorrows Girl"	2024	Aspen Creek, Lars Säfsund	Tomorrow Take You Home

== Additional appearances ==
List of additional appearances with year released, other artists, and album
Title	Other artist	Album	Year
"Dine hender er fulle av blomster"	Geir Hegerstrøm	Alle Synger Glede	2016
"Alfr. Andersen"	Anders Buaas	Larvik Improvizations	2020

== Music videos ==
=== As primary artist ===
List of music videos as primary artist with other artists, year released, and director
Title	Other artist(s)	Released	Director
"En krybbe var vuggen"	Maria Solheim, Lewi Bergrud	2020	—N/a
"Find a Way"	Michael Omartian, Bill Champlin, Jay Graydon	2023	—N/a

=== As featured artist ===
List of music videos as featured artist with other artists, year released, and director
Title	Other artist(s)	Released	Director
"Together We Stand"	Gospel Explosion, Kine	2020	Trym Gulla Dyrnes
"Mouthless Embassy"	Kallias	2023	—N/a
