= Vi skall fara bortom månen =

Song by Carl Öst

from the album Carl Öst sjunger till gitarr
- Language: Swedish
- Released: 1966
- Genre: Christian
- Label: Hemmets härold
- Songwriter: Carl Öst

Vi skall fara bortom månen is a Christian song written by Carl Öst, describing the importance of faith with references to the Space Race between the United States and the USSR. The song was recorded by him on the EP record Carl Öst sjunger till gitarr, released in 1966.

The song was also recorded by Fjugestapojkarna in 1967 and by Donald Bergagård in 1971

In 1979, the song was recorded by Jeja Sundström and Bengt Sändh on the album Sockerdrick svänska pekoral.

The song has also been recorded by Jard & Carina Samuelson.

A live performance by Larz-Kristerz was included on their 2012 video album Dansen inställd pga krogshow.
