= Odd Børresen =

Norwegian linguist and missionary

Odd Børresen (August 19, 1923 – January 22, 2010) was a Norwegian linguist, preacher, and missionary in the present-day Democratic Republic of the Congo, where he was involved with schools and education.

== Life ==
Børresen was born in Sætre in the municipality of Hurum, where he and his seven siblings grew up in a Christian home. In 1942, at the age of 19, he moved to Oslo for further education. He studied history and learned several languages: French, English, and Swahili. He was particularly accomplished with languages, especially Swahili, and had a master's degree in Swahili.

He experienced radical salvation in 1942 and participated in the Pentecostal meetings at the Filadelfia Church in Oslo, where he also worked as a preacher.

His eldest sister, Gudrun Lindstad, was also a missionary in Congo. He was married to missionary Inger-Marie Børresen, who died in 1981, and the couple had two children. Their daughter Thordis Børresen is a missionary in Niger, but previously worked in Congo and Mali.

After a long illness, Børresen died in Oslo on January 22, 2010. He was buried next to his wife at the Høybråten cemetery.

== Work in Congo ==
During a meeting at the Filadelfia Church in Oslo, where new missionaries were being appointed to serve the mission's work in Congo, missionary John Brynhildsen approached Børresen and told him, "You must go there and run a school for mission children."

At the time, Børresen was engaged to Inger-Marie Bastrup. The day before their departure from Norway was both a wedding and a farewell gathering at the church. Odd was 23 years old, and Inger-Marie was 21. The Børresens left as missionaries in 1946 from the Filadelfia Church in Oslo to what was then the Belgian Congo (later Zaire and now the Democratic Republic of the Congo). They were part of the first group of Norwegian missionaries sent to Congo after the Second World War. Both of them worked as schoolteachers.

In 1951, the Børresens were engaged at a teachers' training school in Lemera near Lake Tanganyika. The teachers' school was a collaborative effort between the Norwegian and Swedish Pentecostal movements. Børresen became the director of the school in 1961.

In 1964 the family had to evacuate the area when the teachers' school was occupied by rebels led by Pierre Mulele, backed by Che Guevara. The rebels were based in the mountains above the school. The school's students also had to flee, traveling over the mountains to the provincial capital Bukavu. Because of the turbulence in Lemara during the rebellion, it was decided to move the teaching school to Bukavu, where Børresen again served as director from 1970 to 1971.

== In Norway ==
During his time in Norway, between periods abroad as a missionary, Børresen took various university courses, usually one during each period spent in Norway. In 1977 he received a master's degree in Swahili at Uppsala University, which he earned in conjunction with teaching at Lambertseter High School. Børresen held a permanent position at Lambertseter High School, with extended leaves for the periods he spent in Africa; he held this position until his retirement. In Norway, Odd Børresen was a teacher for the Bible school at Filadelfia Church in Oslo. He also traveled as a preacher.

Børresen was also engaged in integration of immigrants to Norway, particularly Romani. The Norwegian authorities also made use of him as an interpreter for French and Swahili.
