= Erik Andersen Nordquelle =

Erik Andersen Nordquelle (22 June 1858 – 1938) was the leader of the Free Evangelical Fellowship (De Frie Evangeliske Forsamlinger) in Norway, also known as the Free Friends, regarded by many as part of the Pentecostal movement.

== History ==
Thomas Ball Barratt was in the United States when he was baptised in the Holy Spirit. When he returned to Norway, his preaching attracted great attention. In the spring of 1907 Barratt held revival meetings in Oslo, where he preached about the baptism of the Holy Spirit, sanctification and speaking in tongues. He had difficulty in finding a suitable venue for his preaching. Nordquelle and the Free Friends in Torvgaten lent his pulpit to Barratt and there was soon close collaboration between the two.

Many Christians there were skeptical of Barratt, and the new revival met with strong resistance. The people who received baptism in the Holy Spirit were ridiculed as religious fanatics, and satirical cartoons lampooning them appeared in the newspapers. Despite the resistance, or as a result of media attention and gossip, the meetings were well attended. Revivals in Oslo spread with greater speed than in the rest of Norway, and several already established congregations joined the movement. Cooperation between Barratt and Nordquelle went on for some time, but when Barratt rented a separate room in Møllergata, conflict between them arose, with the Free Friends complaining that Barratt had started competing meetings. This conflict ended with a split, and Nordquelle became pastor of the Free Evangelical Fellowship (De Frie Evangeliske Forsamlinger).

== See also ==
- Free church – Christian denomination independent of the state
- Pentecostalism in Norway – Norwegian Christian denomination
- C. M. Seehuus – another early influential Norwegian Pentecostal pastor
