= Egil Svartdahl =

Norwegian Christian minister (born 1954)

Egil Lund Svartdahl
- Egil Lund Svartdahl in 2026
- Born: Egil Svartdahl; 16 August 1954 (age 72); Sarpsborg, Østfold county, Norway
- Occupation: Christian television host
- Spouse: Turid Lund Svartdahl
- Children: Caroline Svartdahl
- Father: Hans Svartdahl

Egil Lund Svartdahl (born 16 August 1954) is a Norwegian Christian minister active in the Pentecostal movement. He has been the pastor of several Pentecostal churches as well as the host of several Norwegian television programs; he is known as the "TV pastor" on TV 2. Svartdahl often speaks about the renewal of the church and taking risks. Fish and fishing are also a common theme in his sermons. He is the son of preacher Hans Svartdahl and brother of Aril Svartdahl.

== Life ==
Svartdahl grew up in Drammen and was educated as a confectioner and worked in the industry for a short time. He felt a call to spread the gospel, and in 1972 completed a five-week Bible school course at the Pentecostal church Filadelfia Oslo.

At an early age he became involved in the church's work and started as a youth worker. In 1976, he took a leadership role when the first youth festival at Hedmarktoppen Folk High School in Hamar was arranged. The festival then became an annual tradition and grew in size. He ended his work as a youth worker at Filadelfia in 1983.

For a year Svartdahl worked at recycling company Jahr og sønner before becoming pastor of Filadelfia Kristiansand. He had a number of ideas and to reach the city's population with the gospel, the church founded local radio and television stations. After eight years as pastor, he took a break, and in 1995 became the head pastor of Filadelfia Oslo. In 2008 he began full-time televangelism.

Svartdahl received the Medierosen prize in 2005, awarded by the Christian organization Tro & Medier.

== TV 2 ==
In 1992, the family moved back to Oslo, where he focused on creating and hosting television programs. The programs were produced by Pentecostal television corporation TV Inter and included Under åpen himmel, Gudesens konditori, and later Søndagsåpent. Søndagsåpent became quite popular and had hundreds of thousands of viewers; the program featured Svartdahl visiting people in Norway to discuss Jesus Christ in their lives. Regarding Svartdahl's employment and future with the station, TV 2's program director Dan Børge Akerød stated in 1992: "There should be room for pure preaching and pure entertainment."

In the fall of 2008, Svartdahl hosted the program Pastor på prøve. He visited people at their workplaces and worked alongside them for several days. The program is based on conversations between Svartdahl and the employees.

From 2013 to 2018 he hosted Reisen hjem on TV 2, which lasted for a total of nine seasons and 33 episodes. The series portrayed the lives and faith of Norwegian celebrities, its portraits providing a glimpse into the until then-unknown faith of many. Svartdahl's guests included Geir Lippestad, Maria Arredondo, Per Fugelli, Siv Jensen, Hans Olav Lahlum, Helene Bøksle and Venke Knutson. Geir Lippestad, who lost his 17 year-old daughter in 2013, spoke on the program about his final hours with her. He had openly asked God for help, saying, "What I remember praying for was simply for him to help me to be here now for Rebekka until tomorrow." Film director and artist Aune Sand commented in 2013 that "...it is more personal to talk about faith than about sex." All of the episodes were made available on TV Inter's YouTube channel in 2018.

== Social media ==
Since November 2019, Svartdahl has been the host of PlussOrd. Every day for a year starting October 28, 2019, Svartdahl gives short, minute-long "words for the day" which are posted on Facebook and Instagram. Each devotional contains a thought, Bible verse, and prayer, and ends with the priestly blessing from Numbers 6:23–27. Each Sunday a longer devotional is posted summarizing the week's theme.

== TV host ==
- 1991–1992 Under åpen himmel (local TV)
- 1993–1995 Gudesens Conditori
- 1998–2004 Søndagsåpent
- 2005–2007 TV-pastoren
- 2008–2011 Pastor på prøve
- 2012 Fyrlyset
- 2013–2018 Reisen hjem

== Awards ==
- 1995 – Petter Dass award
- 2005 – Medierosen, for the program Søndagsåpent
- 2011 – Økumenikkprisen from Norges Kristne Råd
