= Parley Gulbrandsen =

Norwegian missionary (1889–1959)

Parley Birger Eugen Gulbrandsen (Chinese: 金寶立, pinyin: Jīn Bǎolì, born October 30, 1889, in Christiania, died 1959 in Norway) was a Norwegian missionary to China affiliated with the Norwegian Evangelical Mission (NEM) which belonged to the Pentecostal movement. He was the brother of Henry Gulbrandsen, who was also a missionary to China.

After coming in contact with a Pentecostal meeting at the Filadelfia Assembly in Christiania, Gulbrandsen studied their teachings at the mission's home in Stabekk in 1909. Afterwards he studied at the Bible Training Institute in Glasgow, Scotland. In September 1910, he went to China, and worked in the North Chihli Mission in North Zhili (romanized as Chihli at the time) until 1914. He was active in the Longmen district (龍門縣). In 1916, he joined the Norwegian Free Evangelical Mission Association (Norges Frie Evangeliske Missionsforbund, NFEH), launched by the Pentecostal movement in Norway the previous year. When this mission was dissolved in 1934, the former Norwegian missionaries of the NFEH were directly supported by local churches in Norway. Parley Gulbrandsen was in charge for the work at Xinbao'an (新保安) in Zhili (later part of Chahar). This work, which was begun in 1916, became known as the Norwegian mission in Sinpaoan. In Norway, the work was supported by the Filadelfia church at St. Olavs gate 24 in Oslo. Gulbrandsen later worked in the Xuanhua District, Longguan and Beijing. He returned to Norway in 1948; he was awarded the King's Medal of Merit in 1952. Gulbrandsen died in 1959.

Parley Gulbrandsen married Christina "Chrissie" Beruldsen in China in 1911.

== Works ==
- Greetings from China (Hilsen fra Kina), 1926
- Thoughts about the outer mission and a brief overview of Pentecostal mission field (Noen tanker om den ytre misjon og en kort oversikt over pinsevennenes misjonsfelt) Oslo: Filadelfia, 1939

== Literature ==
- Johansen, Oddvar; Hagen, Kjell; Nyen, Astrid Neema; Kolbjørnsrud, Paul and Filberg, Trond. 2010. I all verden. Pinsemisjon i 100 år. PYM 100 år 1910-2010 (jubileumsskrift) De norske pinsemenigheters ytremisjon (PYM).
- Norsk Misjonsleksikon, Volume 2, sp. 143.
