= Børud =

Børud is a surname. Notable people with the surname include:

- Arnold Børud (born 1947), Norwegian singer, musician and record producer
- Ole Børud (born 1976), Norwegian singer, songwriter, musician, producer, and audio engineer
