= Maranata movement =

Swedish Pentecostal movement

The Maranata movement (Maranatarörelsen) is a Swedish Christian Pentecostal free church movement.

== History and beliefs ==
The word Marana'ta! is Aramaic and means approximately "come, O Lord!"; it is taken from the Apostle Paul's First Epistle to the Corinthians in the New Testament in the Christian Bible, chapter 16, verse 22. It was used by the first Christians, especially in connection with communion, as a prayer for the imminent return of Jesus.

In 1959, Pentecostal pastor Donald Bergagård visited Norwegian Aage Samuelsen's Maran Ata meetings in Oslo. He was captivated by the revival and resolved to spread it in Sweden. The Swedish Pentecostal Movement thus experienced a split. In 1960, Bergagård helped found the first Swedish Maranata congregation in Örebro. Several spectacular revival meetings around Sweden gathered large numbers of people. For example, the well-known singer-preacher Målle Lindberg landed in Örnsköldsvik hanging from a helicopter.

The movement was met with controversy. In the 1960s, a 13-year-old diabetic boy from Vaggeryd died after his parents, members of the Maranata movement, refused the use of insulin and medical treatment. Their television broadcasts, featuring ecstatic speaking in tongues, crying, and the laying on of hands, were described in the media as "unpleasant" or "creepy" (Norwegian: uhyggelig). Other articles mention a member being harassed by others in the church after she refused to claim on television that she had been healed by the laying on of hands; she instead called for the media to warn the sick about the church.

From the beginning the movement was loosely organized; in 1967 it splintered in different directions. Donald Bergagård and Erik Gunnar Eriksson broke with the Stockholm congregation led by Norwegian Arne Imsen. In 1968 there were 15 Maranata congregations in Sweden, the largest number in the history of the movement. The following year it had halved to seven.

In 1981, only two congregations remained in the inner circle around Imsen and the newspaper Midnattsropet. Imsen was strongly polemical against all other denominations and congregational movements than his own. He and his followers formed communities or extended families, as well as planning to form a colony in the Dominican Republic. They demonstrated for many years from the 1980s onwards, most recently in the early 2000s, outside Stockholm's Storkyrkan when Kärlekens mässa ('the Love Mass', an LGBT mass) was held there.

The Maranata movement believes that homosexual acts are contrary to Christian doctrine (but not that the orientation itself is sinful). The Maranata movement is against abortion. They do not believe that evolution has occurred. The Maranata movement also advocates that corporal punishment of one's children should be permissible because they believe that God's commandment in this case is above the law. In a 2016 statement from the Maranata congregation in Stockholm, it was stated that the movement does not use corporal punishment on children, but questions the substance of any legislation aimed at weakening the role of the family in society.
