= Donald Bergagård =

Swedish singer, accordionist and evangelist (1936–2026)

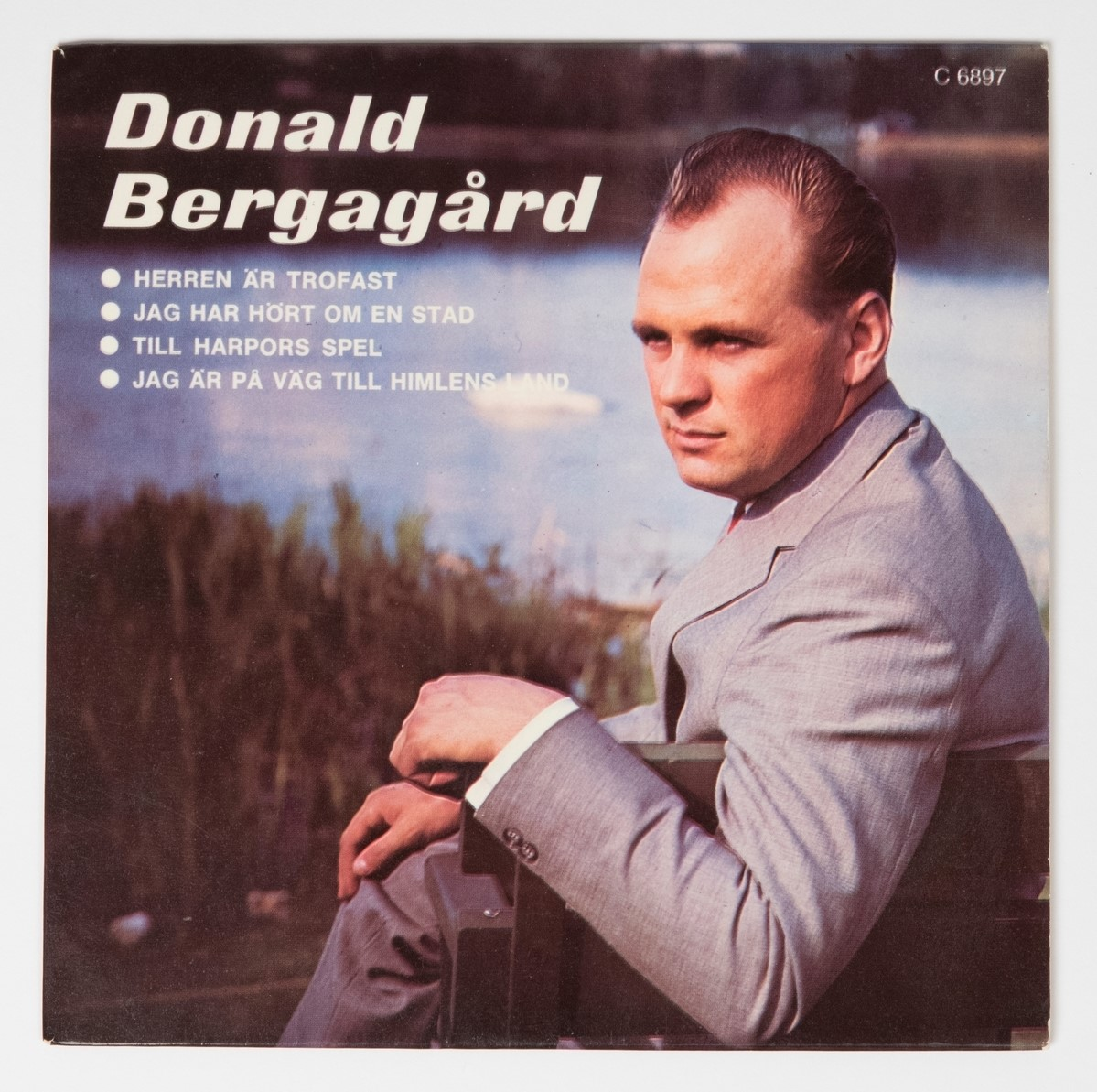

Jack Donald Lennart Bergagård (13 February 1936 – 29 September 2026) was a Swedish singer, accordionist and evangelist.

== Life and career ==
Jack Donald Lennart Bergagård was born in Öckerö on 13 February 1936. In the late 1950s Bergagård was employed as a pastor in the Pentecostal congregation Elim in Örebro. After visiting Aage Samuelsen's Maran Ata meetings in Oslo in 1959, he resolved to spread the movement in Sweden, becoming one of the founders of the Maranata movement there. He founded the first Swedish Maranata congregation in Örebro in 1960.

He was one of the founders of Maran Ata in Oslo, where he was also a pastor from 2001 to 2004. Later that year, he moved to the United States.

Bergagård wrote the Swedish text to the song där rosor aldrig dör/Till en stad jag är på vandring, dit där rosor aldrig dör. The tune was written by Jack & Jim Elsie, under the original title I am going to a city, where the roses never fade.

In March 1963, Bergagård led a Maran Ata meeting in Jönköping, where a 13-year-old boy with diabetes was prayed for. His parents withdrew his insulin shots; the boy died a week later, drawing media attention.

Bergagård died on 29 September 2026, at the age of 90.

== Discography ==
- 1971 – Vi ska fara bortom månen
- 1972 – Jag tänker på staden
- 1977 – Gud kan
- 1978 – Jesus har berett en himmel
- 1982 – Andliga sånger & country
- 1983 – Min kung och jag
- 1984 – Paradiset väntar
- 1985 – Det finns en kärlek
- 1988 – Halleluja, Hosianna, Jesus kommer
- 1993 – Vid havet av kristall
- 1999 – Viloplats i ljusa staden
- 2001 – Den Gud som är på höjden, Han är också i dalen
