= Ivar Skippervold =

Norwegian singer and musician (born 1949)

Ivar Skippervold (born 14 March 1949) is a Norwegian singer and musician.

He hails from Oslo, but moved to Lillesand as an adult. He took up music at an early age, and his first self-made music was protest songs. He became Christian out of a "religious yearning", and his protest songs got a Christian tinge. His first solo record, Hiroshima og spurven, came in 1975. He had already, in 1972, formed the gospel group Frisk Luft together with Rune Larsen, Arnold Børud and Kjell Fjalsett. The group formed by coincidence when Larsen and Børud, performing at Hedmarktoppen, spotted Fjalsett and Skippervold in the audience and invited them onto the stage. Frisk Luft released two LPs in the 1970s, and participated in a television show named Gospelkveld ('Gospel Evening'). Frisk Luft was said to be the first Christian supergroup in Norway.

In the mid-1980s, he was a part of the musical duo Skipper Schei together with Hans Erik Schei. They duo staged a show called "Skipper Schei drar vest". Skippervold also ran a small publishing house Skippers Forlag, and worked at the musical school in Lillesand. In the 1990s, Skippervold made two advent television shows for children, so-called "advent calendars" with 24 episodes for each day in December. Julestua was aired on TVNorge in 1989 with Skippervold and Trygve Wikstøl, and På låven followed in 1992 on TV 2. His song Flere slike dager became the opening song of the popular TVNorge show Reisesjekken. He also made bible-inspired plays for release on cassette, As well as two musicals in 1995, 1997 and 2000. The three musicals were about Ansgar, Saint Nicholas and Jesus respectively. He also continued releasing albums, amassing about 40 releases. Also, Frisk Luft made a public comeback in 1998, and released the record Lifetime Friends in 2000. In 2004 they followed with I'll Never Find Another You. The group performs live every now and then.

He has been called the "Thorbjørn Egner of church music". In 2001, he was awarded the Bible Prize of Norway.
