= Kjell Fjalsett =

Norwegian singer and musician

Kjell Sigurd Fjalsett (born 1952) is a Norwegian singer and musician.

He made a name for himself in the Norwegian gospel and Christian pop scene as a teenager in the choir Believe, covering the song "Oh Happy Day" among other things. He later formed the gospel group Frisk Luft together with Rune Larsen, Ivar Skippervold and Arnold Børud. The group formed by coincidence in 1972, when Larsen and Børud, performing at Hedmarktoppen, spotted the already-known Fjalsett and Skippervold in the audience and invited them onto the stage. They released two LPs in the 1970s, and participated in a television show named Gospelkveld ('Gospel Evening'). It was said to be the first Christian supergroup in Norway. They made a public comeback in 1998, and released the record Lifetime Friends in 2000. In 2004, they followed with I'll Never Find Another You. The group performs live every now and then.

He has also cooperated with songwriter and composer Rolf Løvland, among others on his solo debut record En dag (1976). The record was certified as silver, as one of the few gospel records until then in Norway. Fjalsett emphasized the importance of song lyrics over music, but also stated that the songs needed a commercial appeal beyond the Christian listener segment. Fjalsett cited Andrae Crouch, David Gates and Bread as inspirations. In 2007, Løvland was behind the single Reis meg opp, a cover version of "You Raise Me Up", which Fjalsett performed. The single charted on the list of Norwegian-language songs, Norsktoppen. In 1982, Fjalsett won the contest for the official FIS Nordic World Ski Championships 1982 song. The song, titled Gullfeber ('Gold Fever') was written by Tore Aas and Jan Linnsund, performed by Kjell Fjalsett and Anne Lise Gjøstøl, and selected by a jury of three. Gullfeber narrowly edged out VM på ski, performed by Hanne Krogh.

In 2007, Fjalsett participated in the anti-piracy campaign Piracy Kills Music. He resides at Jar in Bærum, is married and has three children.
