= Stanley Frodsham =

British pastor

- Born: 1882; Bournemouth, England
- Died: 1969 (aged 86–87)
- Occupations: Minister, editor, author
- Religion: Pentecostalism

Stanley Howard Frodsham was a British pastor, editor, author and teacher and one of the founding figures of the Pentecostal movement in Europe. He was the editor of the Pentecostal Evangel and the author of 15 books.

== Life and ministry ==
Frodsham was born in 1882 in Bournemouth, England in a Christian home. As a young man he read a history of Hudson Taylor which he found inspirational. He later attended a YMCA in London, where he described a conversion experience. He then travelled to Johannesburg, South Africa, where he worked for the YMCA for a year in a secretarial role – a work that had just been established there. After this he travelled to Canada in 1906.

On his return from Canada in 1908, Frodsham visited Alexander Boddy in his church in Sunderland, where a series of Pentecostal meetings had been taking place. Frodsham describes receiving the baptism in the Holy Spirit and speaking in tongues. He returned to Bournemouth where he hosted the British-Norwegian Pentecostal pioneer, T. B. Barratt in 1909. Frodsham began publishing a Pentecostal paper, Victory, that year.

The following year, in 1910, Frodsham returned to Canada where he met and married Alice Rowlands. By 1916, he became a pastor for the Assemblies of God, and was elected general secretary within five years. By 1921, he was also elected as editor of the Pentecostal Evangel and all other publications of the Assemblies of God.

In 1928, Frodsham wrote a history of the Pentecostal movement to date, called With Signs Following. In all, he wrote 15 books during his ministry.

Controversy arose in the 1940s when Frodsham became involved in the Pentecostal offshoot Latter Rain Movement. This led to debate and criticism among Pentecostals of the period and eventually led to his retirement. A resolution of the Assemblies of God was adopted reinforcing their official disapproval of the movement and a statement to that effect was published in The Pentecostal Evangel in 1949, after Frodsham's retirement. He remained, for the rest of his life, in the Latter Rain movement.

Owing to his writing and editing, Frodsham was affectionately known as "God's prophet with a pen".

== Bibliography ==
1. Around the World with the Boomerang Boy (1926)
2. With Signs Following (1928)
3. The Spirit-filled Life: A word to those who desire to live a victorious life (1949)
4. Smith Wigglesworth. Apostle of Faith (1969)

== Sources ==
- Anderson, Allan (24 October 2013). An Introduction to Pentecostalism: Global Charismatic Christianity. Cambridge University Press. ISBN 978-1-107-03399-3.
- "Reverend Stanley Frodsham Prophecy: "Coming Deception"". Abiding Place. Archived from the original on 9 June 2010.
- Frodsham, Stanley Howard (1928). With Signs Following: The Story of the Latter-Day Pentecostal Revival. Gospel Publishing House.
- Gee, Donald (1941). The Pentecostal Movement. Elim Publishing. pp. 21–23.
- Gee, Donald (3 December 2014). The Pentecostal Movement - A Short History And An Interpretation For British Readers. Read Books Ltd. ISBN 978-1-4474-9398-3.
- "Stanley Frodsham 1882-1969". Revival Library.
- Wentroble, Barbara (1 September 2009). Removing the Veil of Deception: How to Recognize Lying Signs, False Wonders, and Seducing Spirits. Chosen Books. ISBN 978-1-4412-0477-6.
