= Rune Larsen =

Norwegian journalist, musician, and TV presenter

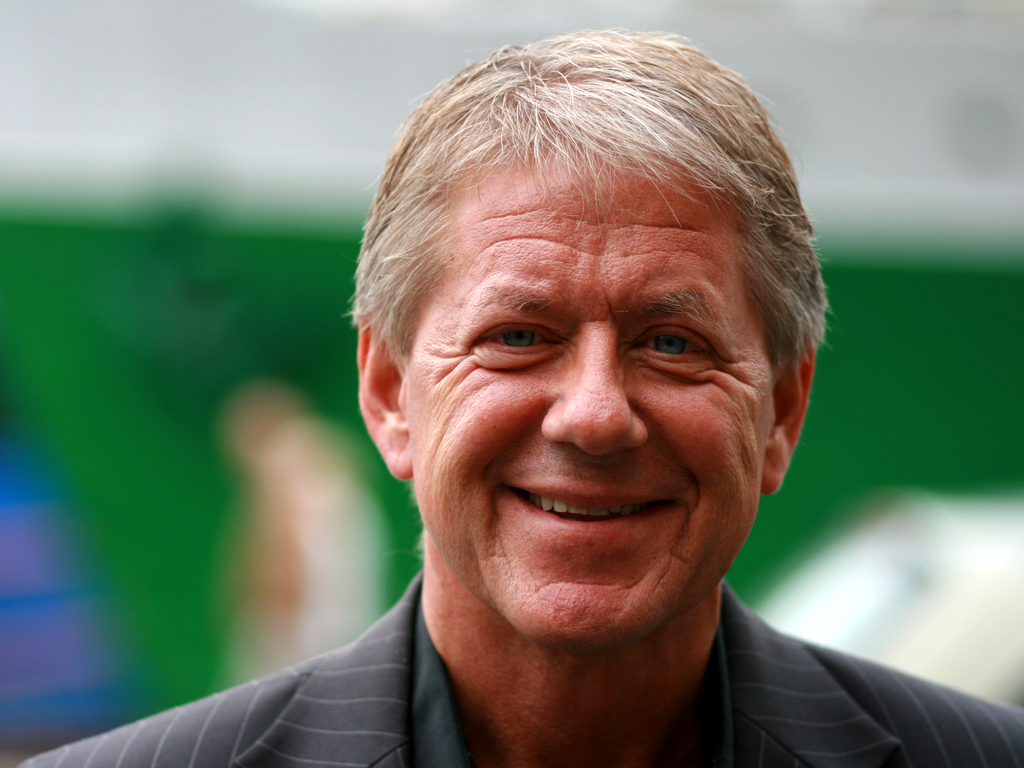
- Rune Larsen in Stavanger in August 2008
- Born: 8 August 1948; Bergen
- Awards: King's Medal of Merit (2013)

Rune Larsen (born 8 August 1948) is a Norwegian journalist, singer, musician, record producer and television presenter.

He was born in Bergen. He made his stage debut in 1957, and his television debut in 1964. By that time, he had already played with two bands, The White Shirts and The Black Diamonds, and rejected a contract offer for a solo career. After appearing on television, however, he bumped into Philips Records manager Per W. Kilde at a concert, and was promptly offered a solo contract. Larsen accepted, and released his first single with Teen Beats ("Cinderella/Y'arriva") in October of the same year (Philips 353.264 PF). Not long after, Larsen joined the group The Stringers. He succeeded Helge Nilsen, who soon rejoined.

Larsen started working as a journalist in Bergens Arbeiderblad in 1967. He came to refer to himself as a Christian socialist. He became involved in the YMCA in 1968, and was a devout Christian from 1969. He did not leave music as he founded a choir in Bergen named Gospel. In July in the same year he also married nurse Edle Tornes, born 1947. Gospel released LPs in 1970 and 1972. With the choir, Larsen made his debut as a television presenter in 1970, in the Norwegian Broadcasting Corporation show Gospel synger gospels.

In 1972, Larsen formed the gospel group Frisk Luft together with Kjell Fjalsett, Ivar Skippervold and Arnold Børud. The group formed by coincidence in 1972, when Larsen and Børud, performing at Hedmarktoppen, spotted the already-known Fjalsett and Skippervold in the audience and invited them onto the stage. Frisk Luft released two LPs in the 1970s, and participated in a television show named Gospelkveld. It was said to be the first Christian supergroup in Norway. Larsen's third television show aired from 1975, and was Hele menigheten synger, a copy of the Swedish Hela kyrkan sjunger. Songs from the show were released on LP and sold well.

Larsen had left the journalist job to become secretary for the YMCA in Trondheim from 1974. He held the same job in Bergen from 1976 to 1978 before returning to journalism, working in Bergens Tidende from 1978 to 1981. He still performed sporadically, trying himself in the national Melodi Grand Prix event with the song Robåtrock in 1977. In 1981, he founded the record company Noah. He also released the album Sweet Mints together with Helge Nilsen, under the name Helge & Rune. The album was produced by Trygve Thue of the band Saft. Several releases followed. In 1983 Larsen discovered later world-famous singer Sissel Kyrkjebø via the television show Syng med oss presented by Nils Abrahamsen. Her first three records (Sissel, Glade jul, Soria Moria) were released on Noah. In 1984 Larsen discovered Karoline Krüger.

Larsen presented the show Lollipop from 1989, together with Trygve Thue, Tor Endresen and the backing band The Lollipops. The signature song was "Lollipop" by The Chordettes, 1958, and the material was taken from that time. Three records were released following the show, and all sold well. Later shows during the 1990s were Scala, Casablanca (TV 2, 1992), Noteknekk, Larsen spesial and Absolutt norsk, the latter co-hosting with Jan Eggum. Another outing in Melodi Grand Prix came in 1993, when Larsen performed Det skulle vært sommer together with Helge Nilsen. In 1997, he released Nære ting with Tor Endresen. Also, Frisk Luft made a public comeback performing live in 1998, and released the record Lifetime Friends in 2000. In 2004, they followed with I'll Never Find Another You.
