= Aage Samuelsen =

Norwegian Christian evangelist and musician

Aage Samuelsen, also known as "Broder Aage" 'brother Aage', (23 January 1915 – 29 November 1987) was a Norwegian Pentecostal Christian evangelist, singer and composer.

== Biography ==
He was the son of factory worker and navvy Karl Hjalmar Samuelsen and Anna Samuelsen née Hansen, a cleaner. He was the third of eight siblings, and grew up in a poor environment in the Bakken neighborhood of Skien. As a child he was often ill and did not learn to walk until he was five or six years old. His mother was musical and bought him a guitar when he was 15. Samuelsen learned to play both harmonica and guitar and sang and composed songs all his life. At the age of 18, he helped start a dance band/jazz band that traveled and performed, including with Excelsior Band. Samuelsen had problems with alcohol abuse at times.

In 1931 a revival swept through the town, started by Thor Sørlie, who had worked closely with Norwegian Pentecostal founder Thomas Ball Barratt. Samuelsen discovered the Pentecostal movement at a revival meeting but did not maintain his newfound faith. In the meantime he worked as a musician. Samuelsen married Elisabeth (Lisa) Olsen in 1938, and together they had five children. In the summer of 1944 he experienced a new conversion and eagerly joined the Pentecostal church Tabernaklet ('The Tabernacle') in Skien, experiencing baptism in the Holy Spirit and speaking in tongues. He participated eagerly in revival work with singing and testimonies. Samuelsen soon became a central figure in the congregation, but was very controversial because of his belief in faith healing. His style of preaching was very informal, personal, direct and humorous.

Samuelsen attracted attention with his style. Meetings he led were well attended and often covered by the press. Samuelsen was interviewed several times in the press and on the radio. He maintained his personal style and was not afraid to speak out. He also took part in humorous features, including the radio program Har du lyst, har du lov, where he sang a self-deprecating song with Leif Juster to the tune of Vi var arbeidskamerater, frøken Johansen og jeg.

A visit to a church in the United States in 1956 left its mark on him, giving him a new self-confidence.

His controversial behavior and his views on healing caused divisions among the Pentecostals. This led to an open conflict and break with the Pentecostal movement. Samuelsen left the church in 1957 after a dispute with the elders' council. After this, he founded his own charismatic movement called Maran Ata, which soon became well-known due to Samuelsen's popularity and style and the congregation's frequent use of speaking in tongues. He made the movement nationally known with extensive activity, his own church magazine, etc. Maran Ata was also the source of the Swedish Maranata movement, founded in 1960 by Donald Bergagård. Later, there was also a split between Samuelsen and Maran Ata, and he formed Vekkeropet Maran Ata, which, however, never became anything other than an apparent organizational foundation for the person of Aage Samuelsen.

Samuelsen believed that he was the inspiration for the main character in the 1966 feature film Broder Gabrielsen, and took great offense at this.

In his later years, a new interest in Samuelsen as a person and in his singing emerged. He was invited to perform at the Momarkedet festival and similar events, but it was primarily the artist and entertainer Aage Samuelsen people wanted to hear, not the preacher. He recorded about 30–40 singles, 15 78-records and 17 LP records. His albums sold well, and his religious recordings even entered the Norwegian official charts.

The most famous of his songs, O, Jesus, du som fyller alt i alle, is included in the hymnals Norsk Salmebok and Norsk salmebok 2013. It has been recorded many times and by many artists, including Samuelsen's grandson Raymond Rissmann. His music has also been performed by others in new styles.

In Samuelsen's autobiography Herrens glade trubadur ('The Lord's merry troubadour') he wrote of his life as an artist, preacher and also about his long-term alcohol abuse.

Towards the end of his life he bought the Dalen Hotel in Telemark, and had great plans to turn it into a center for Christian activities. Inexperienced as he was in business, he fell victim to several dubious "investors", and the whole project ended in financial chaos.

Samuelsen died of a heart attack in 1987. He was buried at Nordre Gravlund in Skien. Politician Kåre Kristiansen officiated at the funeral.

== Discography ==
- Herrens Glade Jubelgut
- Aage Samuelsens Beste
- Det Er Vekkelsesluft Over Landet
- Vi Møter Åge På Møte
