= Hedmarktoppen Folk High School =

Folk high school in Hamar, Norway

Coordinates: 60.8197°N 11.0453°E

Hedmarktoppen Folk High School Norwegian: Hedmarktoppen Folkehøgskole
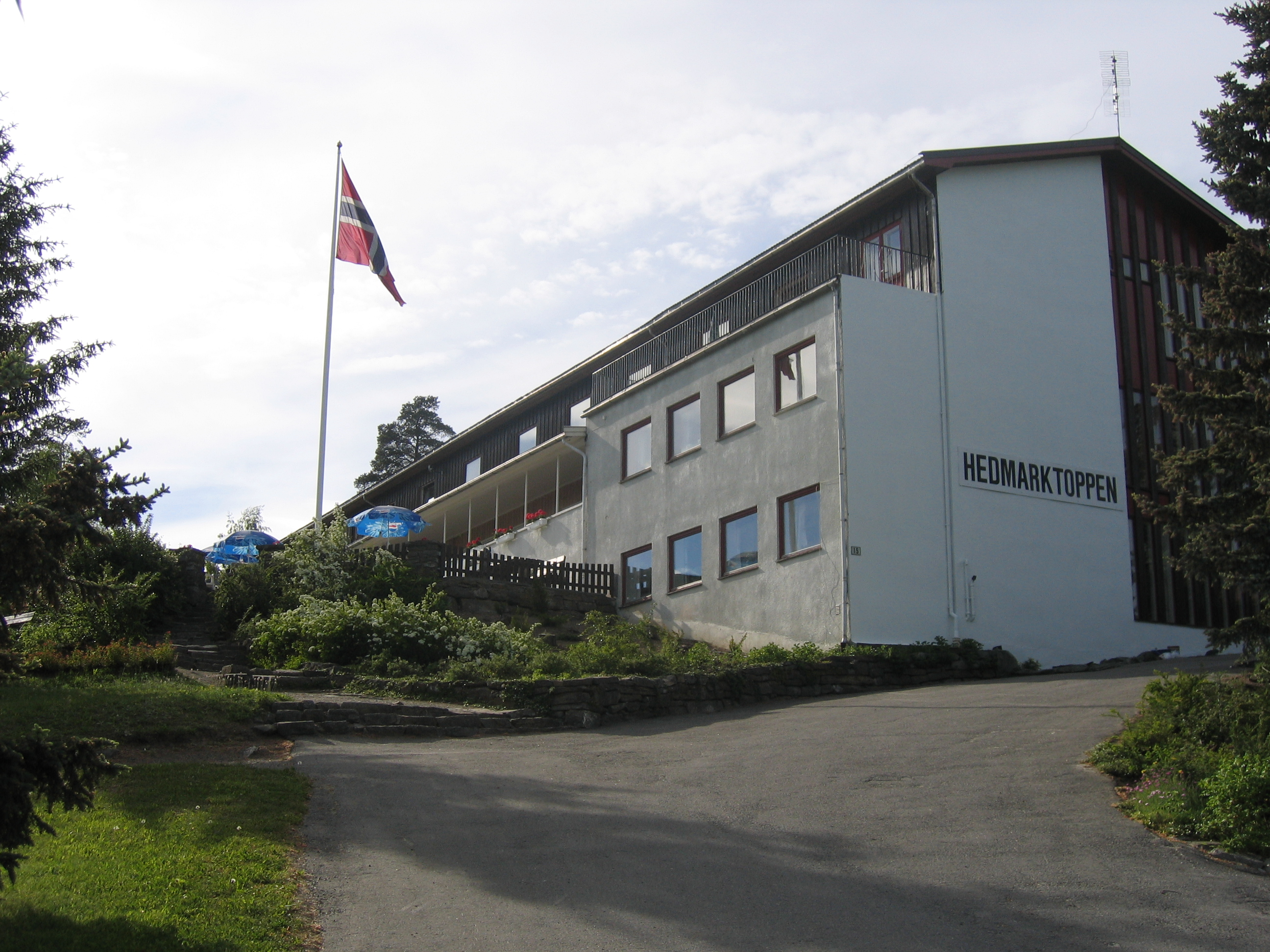

Information
- Established: 1970; 55 years ago

Hedmarktoppen Folk High School (Norwegian: Hedmarktoppen Folkehøgskole) is a folk high school in Hamar.

It was established in 1970, and is owned and run by the Norwegian Pentecostal movement.

Gospel music events are held there, and the gospel supergroup Frisk Luft was formed during such an event by Kjell Fjalsett, Rune Larsen, Ivar Skippervold and Arnold Børud in 1972.

The Pentecostals at Hedmarktoppen were also the first to broadcast radio outside of the Norwegian radio monopoly. This happened on 16 December 1981, before Willoch's first cabinet actually implemented its liberalizing broadcasting policies, which were enacted on 1 January 1982.
