= Carl Öst =

- Born: 19 January 1908; Alfta Parish, Sweden
- Died: 13 February 1988 (aged 80) Ovanåker Parish, Sweden
- Occupations: Singer, musician
- Instruments: Violin, guitar

Carl Öst (19 January 1908 in Alfta Parish – 13 February 1988 in Ovanåker Parish) was a Swedish singer and musician playing the violin and guitar. Originally playing folk music, he later switched to Christian music.

== Discography ==
=== Albums ===
- 1968 Hemmakväll hos familjen Carl Öst
- 1971 Carl Öst sjunger och spelar; Theofil Engström sjunger och spelar
- 1973 Calle Östs bästa
- 1975 Sånger för stora och små
- 1978 Stugmöte

=== Singles and EP records ===
- 1957 Vi har kommit ombord
- 1958 Nu är jag lycklig
- 1959 Jag får räkna med Jesus i allt
- 1959 Jag vill ha mycket, mycket mer
- 1960 Han gör inga misstag
- 1961 Härliga morgon
- 1964 Jag seglar hem
- 1963 Pelle
- 1965 Sången om Jesus
- 1966 Vi skall fara bortom månen
- 1967 Han står vid rodret
