= Filadelfia Oslo =

Pentecostal church in Oslo, Norway

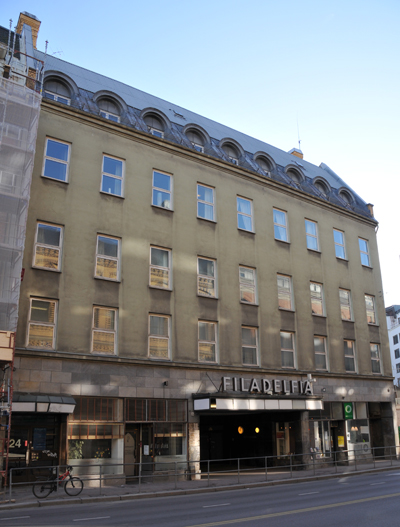
Filadelfia on St. Olavs gate, Oslo, as the building looked before a complete renovation from 2010-2012. Credit: J. P. Fagerback

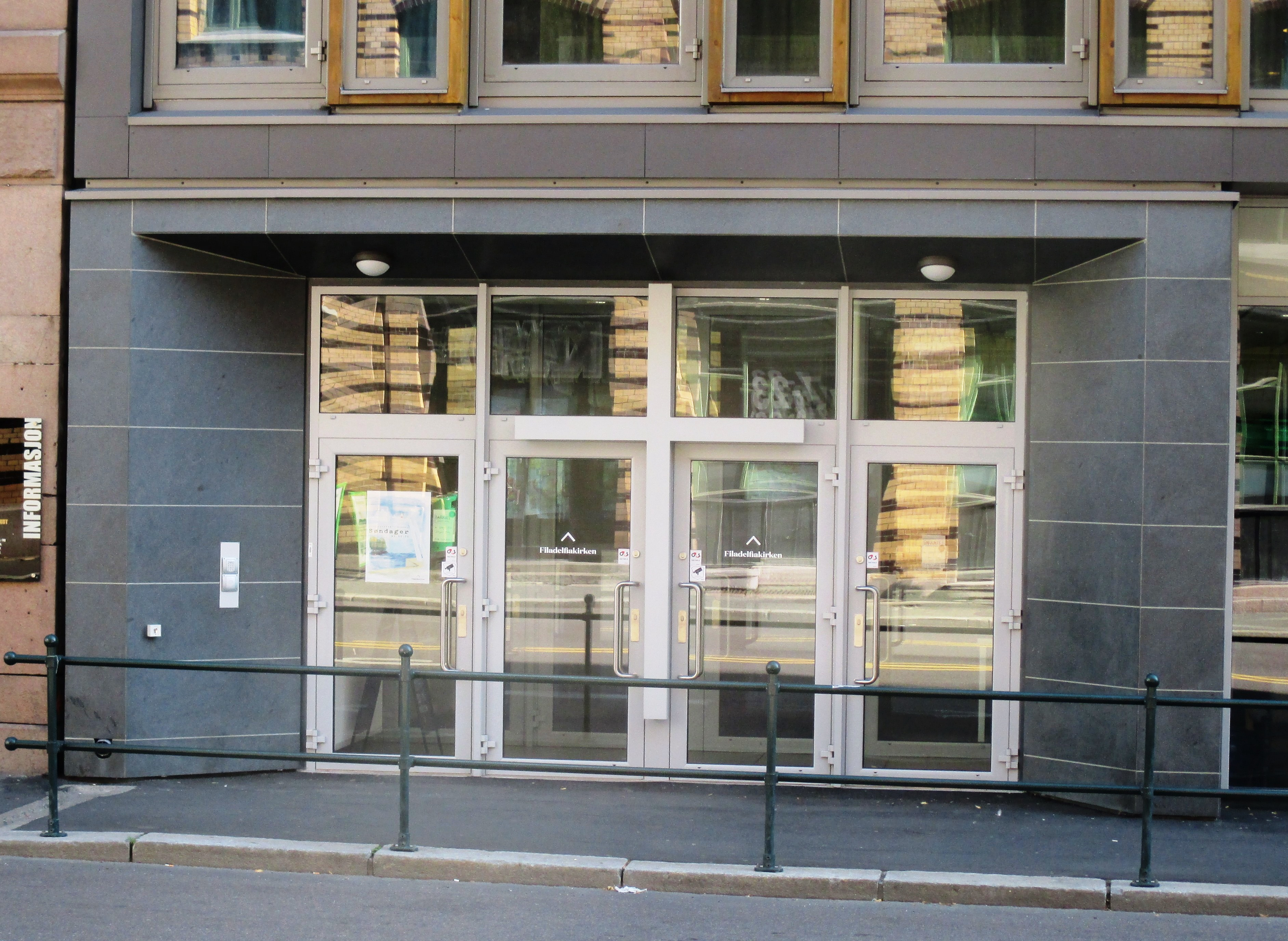
After remodeling, the facade has been changed significantly and the entrance moved to the left. Credit: Jan-Tore Egge

Filadelfia Oslo or Filadelfia Church Oslo (Norwegian: Filadelfiakirken Oslo) is a Christian church associated with the Pentecostal movement in Norway. It is the largest Pentecostal congregation in Norway with 2,092 members in 2019. It conducts extensive work both at home and abroad.

== History ==
Filadelfia Oslo was founded by pastor Thomas Ball Barratt in 1916 and was the first church in Kristiania (now Oslo) which was part of the Pentecostal movement. He was pastor until 1940. Although the church was formally established in 1916, almost ten years after the beginning of the movement in Norway, it had already been holding services in a number of rented locations since 1910. At its founding, Filadelfia had approximately 200 members; in 2012 there were approximately 2,000 members, with 1,825 baptized members and 538 tilhørige ('belonging' unbaptized members [children]).

The church has always held a central place in the Norwegian Pentecostal movement due to its origins and size.

The church's building on St. Olavs gate, the so-called "new" Filadelfia, was consecrated in 1938, after an extensive renovation. According to Thomas Barratt's memoir, architect Thomas Strandskogen was the building committee's chairman.

In 2010 a new renovation was begun, resulting in a new front building with a foyer, coffee bar, and offices.

As of January 2020, the church consists of six congregations in six locations:

- Filadelfia Church City Center (St. Olavs gate, Oslo)
- Microfila Children's Church (St. Olavs gate, Oslo)
- Ungfila (St. Olavs gate, Oslo)
- Filadelfia Church Majorstuen
- Filadelfia Church Lillestrøm
- Filadelfia Church Enebakk

=== Pastors (chronological) ===
- Thomas Ball Barratt
- Osvald Orlien
- Knut Petersen
- Paul Paulsen
- Erling Strøm
- Morgan Kornmo
- David Østby
- Egil Svartdahl
- Daniel Egeli
- Andreas Hegertun, Håkon Jahr, Daniel Egeli (current members of the leadership team)

== Programs ==
Filadelfia's most important programs are:

- Sunday services with Sunday school
- Møtepunkt – ('meeting point') Sunday service
- Ungfila – youth group
- Filadelfia Bible School
- Alpha course – course in the basics of Christianity
- Småfellesskap – cell groups that meet at home
- Filos – youth club at Sagene
- Center for prayer and spiritual care

== Mission ==
From its beginning, Filadelfia has been responsible for missionaries around the world. Through the Pentecostal Foreign Mission of Norway, the church supports mission work in the Democratic Republic of the Congo (through Communauté des Églises libres de Pentecôte en Afrique or CELPA, the Association of Free Pentecostal Churches in Africa), the Philippines, India, and the Middle East, among other areas.

Some of the most active missionaries sent or supported by the church have been Robert Bergsaker (India), Laura Strand (South Africa), Odd Børresen (Congo), Torborg Larsen (Israel), Solvor and Geir Hande (Niger), Unni and Werner Haugen (Congo), and Heidi and Roberto Enconado (the Philippines).

== Leadership ==
The church has both administrative and spiritual leadership. Spiritual leadership consists of a leadership board (also called board of elders), pastors with various areas of responsibility, and the leadership team. The board of elders is chosen by the church's highest body, its members.

Pastors:

- Daniel Egeli (pastor)
- Andreas Hegertun (pastor)
- Håkon Jahr (head of the leadership team)
- Egil Svartdahl (pastor)
- Tore Deila (pastor)
- Kristin Hauge Roaldsnes (pastor)
- Halvard Hauge Roaldsnes (pastor)
- Chris-Michael Børud Gustavsen (youth pastor)
- Linn Lindtveit (children's and family pastor)
- Laila Egeli Austeng (children's pastor)
- David André Østby (worship music pastor)

== Mother church ==
Filadelfia Blaker in Blaker is a branch of the Filadelfia Church.

Filadelfia Church is the mother church of many international, non-Norwegian ethnic churches in Oslo:

- Church of Pentecost
- Shalom Eritrean Pentecostal Church
- Shekinah Church
- Filipino Christian Church
