= Thomas Ball Barratt =

Norwegian Pentecostal pastor (1862–1940)

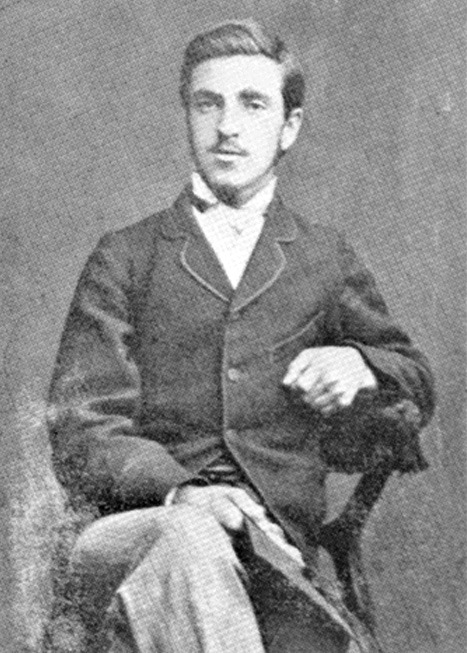
- Thomas Ball Barratt in 1878, 16 years old.
- Born: 22 July 1862; Cornwall, England
- Died: 29 January 1940 (aged 77); Oslo, Norway
- Occupation: Minister
- Spouse: Laura Jakobsen (m. 1887)
- Children: 8; 4 survived to adulthood, including Mary Barratt Due
- Religion: Methodism, Pentecostalism

Thomas Ball Barratt, also known as T. B. Barratt, (22 July 1862 – 29 January 1940) was a British-born Norwegian pastor and one of the founding figures of the Pentecostal movement in Europe, bringing the movement, or baptism in the Holy Spirit, as it became known, to Norway and Europe in 1906. He was originally a Methodist pastor but later left the church and went on to establish the Pentecostal movement in Norway.

Close to his heart were the matters of salvation, his social engagement (charitable work), and "fight against alcohol." He was seen as one of the founders and leaders of the European Pentecostal movement. His motto was "Fram til urkristendommen," 'onward to ancient Christianity'. He was interested in art, singing, and music, and translated songs to Norwegian. He was a sought-after preacher and wrote several books and a number of theological articles in Christian publications.

On 10 May 1887, Barratt married Laura Jakobsen. They had eight children, though only four survived to adulthood. Daughter Mary Barratt Due was a pianist; together with her husband Henrik Adam Due they founded the Barratt Due Institute of Music in 1927. Musicians Cecilie Barratt Due and Stephan Barratt-Due are Thomas Ball Barratt's grandchildren.

Barratt died 29 January 1940. On his deathbed he stated, "There was more land to conquer."

== Life and ministry ==
Barratt was born in Albaston, Cornwall. His father, Alexander Barratt, led the sulfur mining operation at Varaldsøy in Hardanger and moved there alone in 1867. The rest of the family came to Norway in 1868, when Barratt was five years old. He grew up to be fluent in English and Norwegian.

His parents were highly active in the Methodist movement. As an eleven-year-old, Barratt was sent to a Methodist school in England and received salvation at twelve years of age. He received his theological education at Wesleyan Collegiate Institute in Taunton, now known as Queen's College, where he also studied art and music. He also studied under composer Edvard Grieg in Norway.

=== Methodism ===
After Barratt began preaching at age 17, he pastored several churches in the Methodist Episcopal Church of Norway. In 1885, he went to Kristiania (now Oslo), where he worked as a preacher for a year at the Second Methodist Church. In 1886, he moved back to Voss. In western Norway, he met Laura Jakobsen, who would become his wife in 1887, at the Free Evangelical Fellowship free church in Bergen. At 27 years old, in 1889, he returned to Kristiania as pastor of the Third Methodist Church, Centralkirken, where he worked until 1902. His work there eventually led to him taking on a number of other tasks. He founded Byposten ('The City Mail'), now Korsets Seier ('Victory of the Cross'), which was first published on 27 February 1904. The newsletter featured edifying articles and reports on Christian work around the world. In 1902 Barratt founded Kristiania Bymisjon ('Kristiania city mission'), a social work organization. He desired to help alcoholics and the downtrodden. The annual Methodist conference had given him its blessing, but without particular enthusiasm. After three years, in 1905, he planned to build a large new building in Oslo, Håkonsborg, as the current building was becoming too cramped. The new building was to be a center for the mission. He travelled to New York in 1906 to raise money.

=== In the United States ===
Barratt rented a room in preacher A.B. Simpson's guesthouse in Manhattan. The guesthouse was a temporary residence for missionaries waiting to travel by ship to their mission fields on other continents; today the organization is known as the Christian and Missionary Alliance. Barratt's attempts to raise money for his planned building, Håkonsborg, were unsuccessful. During his stay in New York, he sent reports about Christian life in America to Norway, which were published in the newsletter Byposten.

=== Speaking in tongues and baptism in the Holy Spirit ===
In New York, he heard about the Azusa Street Revival occurring in Los Angeles. Barratt had long desired baptism in the Holy Spirit, and in September 1906 he came across the newsletter The Apostolic Faith, published by the Azusa Street Mission. He never made it Los Angeles to attend the Azusa Street Revival as he lacked the money. He did, however, send a letter there; the reply he received changed his life. It challenged him to give his life and plans to God, so he prayed and experienced a breakthrough on 7 October 1906, being baptised in the Holy Spirit. On 15 November 1906, he experienced another breakthrough as he spoke and sang in tongues.

I was, like Daniel, completely helpless during God's divine touch and had to support myself with a table on the platform where I sat and slid down onto the floor. Again my speech organs began to move, but no sound could be heard. I asked a brother (a Norwegian) who had often heard me preach in Christiania, and the doctor's wife, to pray for me yet again. 'Try to speak', said the Norwegian. But I answered that if the Lord wanted to speak through a human being, then he would have to make me do it with his Spirit! This would have to be real! While I prayed, they saw a crown of fire above my head and a cloven tongue of fire in front of the crown. Many saw the supernaturally strong red light. Of course I didn't see it. But at the same moment my entire being was filled with light, and an indescribable power, and now I started to speak in a foreign language with all my might....

— Thomas Ball Barratt, Erindringer

He said further that at four o'clock in the morning, he was speaking in tongues in several languages. He sang in the Spirit and his voice was different, clear, strong, and pure. In 1906, in the newsletter Byposten, in Norway, Barratt wrote about what had happened to him in the United States. His articles from New York told of a "Pentecost anew. Los Angeles has been visited by an awakening reminiscent of the one described in the second chapter of Acts" and "A flash of light from the west. When I received my baptism in the Spirit." According to Barratt, he was the first in New York to have experienced baptism in the Spirit like those in Los Angeles.

=== Back in Norway ===
Barratt returned to Norway in December 1906 without funds or church support. With his return, his baptism in the Spirit caused a stir. Others had heard about it from Byposten and he began to hold meetings in Oslo. This was the beginning of several revival meetings which included speaking in tongues. He rented Turnhallen (a gymnastics hall) in Oslo, across the street from where the congregation he founded, Filadelfia Oslo, is located today. When Barratt took the podium 23 December 1906, and was about to tell about his baptism in the Spirit, he could only stand there crying. In the end, he left the podium without having preached. The day after Christmas, he held another meeting and Christmas party. The hall was packed. Several more meetings were held between Christmas and New Year, including a Christmas party at Kristiania Bymisjon in the Methodist church. After the children went home, the room was filled with adults for a Pentecostal revival that lasted all night. By New Year, ten people had been baptised in the Spirit in Oslo. This marked the start of the Pentecostal movement in Norway.

=== Break with the Methodist Church ===
Barratt was a Methodist pastor until 1907, but after returning from the United States, he did not serve in the Methodist Episcopal Church again. He gave up leadership of Kristiania Bymisjon and began to hold his own meetings. In 1909 the leading actor Anna Larssen Bjørner gave up her high-profile career to become an evangelist. She had been inspired by Barrett to make this change to her life.

The Methodist Church desired to distance itself from his charismatic direction and terminated his membership in 1909, after which he travelled to the UK once more, preaching in Sion College, London and then returning to Sunderland for what had become an annual Pentecost celebration known as the Whitsuntide Convention. He then visited Bournemouth and stayed with Stanley Frodsham, another early Pentecostal pioneer and writer.

=== The Norwegian Pentecostal movement takes shape ===
The gymnastics hall was often in use so it became necessary for Barratt to find other arrangements. Eventually, the meetings were held in smaller buildings. Most churches allowed him to use their space early on, and he held meetings at the Baptist Tabernacle church, Misjonsforbundets Betlehem, and several of Oslo's Methodist churches. The Free Evangelical Fellowship, led by pastor Erik Andersen Nordquelle, had their meetings in Oslo and allowed Barratt to use his pulpit; the two developed a close cooperation. It lasted for a while, but this was to change in 1910. When Barratt began to rent separate meeting facilities, the Free Evangelical church believed Barratt was holding his own competing meetings; this led to a split. Nordquelle led the Free Evangelical Fellowship and Barratt's meetings were to become the Norwegian Pentecostal movement. In 1916, he established a Pentecostal assembly at Møllergata 38 in Oslo; today the church is located on St. Olavs gate and known as Filadelfia Oslo.

=== Spread of the movement and reactions ===
Barratt had not desired to start a new movement, but it was to be the result of his work. The new revival met strong opposition and its followers were seen as religious fanatics by other Christians. Satirical cartoons were featured in newspapers and rotten eggs were thrown at him as he went for walks. Despite the opposition, or as a result of media attention and gossip, the revival in Oslo quickly spread throughout Norway—several existing Norwegian parishes also joined the movement. Additionally, the movement attracted international attention. Lewi Pethrus from Sweden, Alexander Boddy from England and Jonathan Paul from Germany came to Oslo, and became convinced of the divine origin of the movement; they became leaders of the Pentecostal movement in their respective countries. Alexander Boddy visited Barratt early in 1907 and prevailed upon him to visit Sunderland. Barratt sailed from Norway in late August 1907, arriving at Newcastle in September. His preaching marked the beginning of the meetings at All Saints' Church in Monkwearmouth, Sunderland, under the ministry of Boddy. On 13 September, Barratt wrote "the eyes of the religious millions of Great Britain are now fixed on Sunderland." Nevertheless, his observation was not reflected in writings from the established church. Barratt returned to Norway on 18 October. Barratt continued to travel abroad, visiting Sweden, Finland, Poland, Estonia, Iceland and Denmark.

In 1908, the first Pentecostal congregation in Norway (Tabernaklet Skien) was founded in Skien by C. M. Seehuus, who also became the congregation's first pastor. Seehuus had broken from the Baptist church in Skien, which he had led.

=== Cooperation with the Smith brothers ===
In the early phases of the Byposten newsletter, Barratt received help from linguistically talented dentist Aksel Smith, younger brother of Johan Oscar Smith, founder of what is known today as Brunstad Christian Church. They had all left the Methodist Church and cooperated informally for several years. Nevertheless, they faced disagreements as the Smith brothers could not accept Barratt's preaching that sin was removed through baptism in the Spirit.

Barratt and the Smith brothers shared a liberal view on women compared to Christendom in Norway at the time, and they worked as willingly together with women as with men. One of these women was Gunda Willersrud who had founded a gathering in Ålesund, Norway, known as Gundasekta, 'the Gunda sect'. After having followed the new Pentecostal movement, she broke with Barratt in 1916, to the advantage of Johan Oscar Smith's parallel movement; later there was to be a split between Willersrud and Smith.

=== Baptism ===
Barratt was not baptised in water until 1913. He had not believed in the necessity of believer's baptism to join the Pentecostal church, but after thorough study of the Bible, he changed his mind and underwent baptism. Both he and his wife Laura were baptised on 15 September 1913 by Swedish pastor Lewi Pethrus at the Filadelfia Church in Stockholm, Sweden.

=== As a leader ===
Barratt was said to have had a slightly bowed and rocking gait, a mild, pleasant disposition, and a good sense of humor. He saw himself as a leader; the opposition, critique, and public ridicule he faced the first few years made him a humble leader.

Musician Karsten Ekorness was active in Filadelfia Oslo the last twelve years of Barratt's life. He remembered Barratt as a democratic leader—everyone was allowed to express an opinion and debates could be lively. Any issues regarding the church's leadership received thorough treatment.

Barratt was seen by many as the primary leader of the European Pentecostal movement. He was elected President of the Great European Pentecostal Conference in Stockholm in 1939 by a unanimous vote. He remained the pastor of Filadelfia Oslo until his death in 1940.

=== As a preacher ===
Barratt stood out as a preacher and held speeches across the Nordic countries. During his travels and visits to various congregations, he spoke often about his baptism in the Spirit. His meetings often received a strong response. When Barratt visited Mosjøen, Norway, in 1933, the hall was packed and a long line of people extended down the street; Barratt's visit made a strong impression. New Pentecostal assemblies were established at several of the locations he visited. Musician Karsten Ekorness described the services as having a liveliness; Barratt did not like formal rituals but allowed freedom to rule the service. He often had quite complete outlines for his sermons but also spoke freely without sticking to the outline. His sermons were thorough, well thought out, and delivered in a cultivated and distinct way.

=== Songwriter and musician ===
On Barratt's 75th birthday, Karsten Ekorness debuted as a soloist at Filadelfia Oslo with Barratt accompanying him on piano. Ekorness became a close partner regarding the church's music. The church choir was started by Barratt in 1932 and later taken over by Ekorness.

Barratt was a prolific songwriter and had a large impact on the music of the Pentecostal movement. It is said that he would sit at the piano and play an improvised musical commentary to conversations and discussions. He often played piano while whistling melodies.

He wrote lyrics for over one hundred songs and composed melodies for several of his lyrics. He also translated a number of songs into Norwegian. In 1911 he published the Maran ata songbook. It was the Norwegian Pentecostal movement's first songbook and contained 110 songs written by Barratt, along with 130 of his translations into Norwegian. However, this was not his first songbook. Previously, he had published Evangelie sanger in 1887, which contained 96 of his own songs. His songs have been widely sung since and have been published in a number of songbooks.

Barratt's last solo in church (at Filadelfia Oslo) was the first Sunday of 1940 and Ekorness accompanied him on piano. The lyrics were to be prophetic: "I am coming, I am coming, for my head is bowed, I hear voices calling me to the peace of heaven." He died several weeks later, on 29 January 1940 in Oslo and was buried there. Up to 20,000 people are said to have lined the streets for his funeral.

== Mission work ==
Mission work has been important in the Pentecostal movement from the very beginning. Early on, Barratt established the Pentecostal Foreign Mission of Norway (De norske pinsemenigheters ytremisjon, PYM) which sent missionaries particularly to countries in Asia and Africa. Later, in 1929, he supported the organization's dissolution. From then on, missionaries were sent by individual congregations. The congregations were also responsible for their financial support. This created a close relationship between the missionary in the mission field and the congregation; Pentecostal churches have therefore sent a high number of missionaries compared to the number of church members. Today, missionaries are still sent by individual congregations but the umbrella organization PYM is responsible for coordination.

== Byposten ==
Barratt started the magazine Byposten in 1904, while he was still a pastor in the Methodist Church. When he broke with the Methodists, he kept the publication. Its name was changed in 1910 to Korsets Seier, and it remains the primary mouthpiece for the Pentecostal movement in Norway. Barratt was an avid writer for the magazine.

== Works ==
Barratt wrote a number of devotionals and articles in Christian publications, especially for Byposten, or Korsets Seier, as it is known today. Additionally, he preached a large number of sermons and both wrote and translated songs.

=== Books ===
- 1887 – Evangeliske sanger (songbook)
- 1899 – Erik Arnesen eller den store forvandlingen
- 1911 – Maran ata (songbook)
- 1919 – Den kristne dåp
- 1926 – Verdens midtpunkt, Jesus
- 1927 – Ledetråd i Guds ord: for ungdom og nyfrelste
- 1927 – When the fire fell: An outline of my life
- 1932 – Et ord til alle. Prekener.
- 1933 – De kristne menigheter
- 1933 – Kvinnens rolle i menigheten
- 1935 – Står Jesu gjenkomst for døren
- 1938 – Ekteskap, skilsmisse og gjengifte
- 1939 – Bak død og grav. Mellemtilstanden og evigheten. Finnes det et helvete?
- 1941 – Erindringer (autobiography)
- 1950 – T.B. Barratt – Minneutgave 3 – Brennende spørsmål
- 1950 – T.B. Barratt – Minneutgave 4 – Den kristne dåp – De kristne menigheter
- Unknown date – Forvandlet
- Unknown date – Den store Glæde
