= Free Evangelical Fellowship =

Evangelical free church in Norway

The Free Evangelical Fellowship (De Frie Evangeliske Forsamlinger)
- Classification: Protestant
- Orientation: Pentecostal
- Region: Norway
- Founder: Erik A. Nordquelle
- Origin: 1880s
- Members: 8,000 - 10,000
- Official website: www.dfef.no

The Free Evangelical Fellowship (Norwegian: De Frie Evangeliske Forsamlinger, DFEF), formerly called "The Free Friends" (De frie venner) is one of the Free Church congregations in Norway. The Free Evangelical Fellowship is a nationwide movement with sixty-seven parishes and contact addresses in Norway. The churches are legally independent. It is estimated that the local churches comprise a total of 8,000-10,000 members. Churches are mainly located in the south and west of the country. Its origins date from the 1880s, but it became an established organization after 1900 under the leadership of preacher Erik A. Nordquelle (1858–1938). Its Home and Mission Committee (Misjons- og Hjemmeutvalget) is a joint mission conducted in several countries in Africa, Asia, Europe and South America.

The Free Evangelical Fellowship believe in baptism of the Holy Spirit through speaking in tongues and healing by prayer. They also practice baptism and holy communion (open to non-members). The movement's theological standing is seen as similar to Pentecostal beliefs, but they had historically separated themselves as opponents of state-maintained church member registers. The Free Evangelical Fellowship is therefore not registered as a separate religious branch in Norway. In 2019, the Free Evangelical Fellowship entered into a three-year cooperative trial agreement with the Pentecostal congregations in Norway.
