= Pentecostal Foreign Mission of Norway =

The Norwegian Pentecostal Church, (Norwegian: De norske pinsemenigheters ytremisjon, abbreviated PYM) is a Christian organization that conducts mission operations and social work in many countries. The Pentecostal Foreign Mission of Norway is the collective term for Norwegian Pentecostal involvement in Christian missions, i.e. outside Norway. Social work, pastoral work, and evangelism have been its missionaries' most important work.

The Pentecostal Foreign Mission of Norway is the third-largest Norwegian missionary society, and has involvement in Africa, Asia, Latin America and Europe. The Mission's main task is evangelism and establishing new churches (church planting). Along with these tasks, social and humanitarian work have always been important. Additionally, diaconal work, construction and operation of schools, translation of literature, developing writing systems where lacking, training and knowledge of agriculture, water, medical offices, healthcare and other assistance to improve the welfare of the communities are also important.

== Operations ==
- Missionary work in more than thirty countries on four continents.
- Around three hundred active missionaries, of whom about half are on the mission field and together over a thousand missionaries were sent out.
- Running 25 (figures from year 2004) development projects in cooperation with the Norwegian Missions Development Board.

=== Organization ===
The work is divided into seven field committees with responsibility for each geographical area. The areas are Latin America, Southeast Africa, Asia, Europe and the Middle East, Israel, Congo, Niger and Eurasia. The leaders in these fields ranges constitute the Board of the Pentecostal Foreign Mission of Norway.

Publication of financial responsibilities and employer responsibilities for the various missionaries are on the basis of each individual Pentecostal Church in Norway. It has never been a common strategy for the Norwegian Pentecostal Mission because the missionaries are sent by individual churches and the Pentecostal movement has had great respect for the individual missionary vocation and the commission is engaged in many countries across the world.

The Pentecostal Foreign Mission of Norway does not send out missionaries itself, but is a head office or the service authority for the work, which is responsible for the actual work to be effective for the missionaries. Examples include visa applications, travel arrangements, contact with the foreign ministry and embassies as well as travel insurance and personnel matters.

The Mission office has special expertise in areas where individual missionaries and churches do not have it, and helps resolve the many different requirements imposed by the authorities. There are financial reporting, project documents, and other competencies necessary for the correct management of public funds. All the above churches are registered to the public sector in Norway.

Svein Jacobsen is secretary general of the Pentecostal Foreign Mission of Norway; he has previously been a missionary in Swaziland for ten years and has been pastor of the Nesodden Pentecostal Church.

=== Mission Funds ===
The funds awarded to Bible schools train pastors and evangelists on the mission field.

=== Children's Council ===
The Pentecostal Foreign Mission of Norway provides child labor support work for children who have difficulties and are suffering in areas of great poverty and social distress. Efforts have been undertaken to alleviate their social, material and spiritual distress. There are institutions and orphanages in several places around the world, including India, Paraguay, and the Philippines which have been helped. Funds from the missionaries have alleviated hunger and provided education to children who have not had the opportunity. Children's Aid has also provided children with clothing, medicine, literature and much more. Revenues come mainly as voluntary gifts from individuals, Sunday schools and churches. Information about the work is published in the publication Good News.

=== Aid help ===
The Pentecostal Foreign Mission of Norway helps collect clothes, toys, footwear, equipment for hospitals and the like, and sends it to where the need is greatest. The work is unpaid and voluntary work is undertaken where the need is greatest, especially where there is war, famine and natural disasters.

== History ==
The Mission's drive and goal to help others have always been important in the Pentecostal movement. Thomas Ball Barratt, founder of the Pentecostal movement in Norway, was also a driving force for mission involvement abroad. Missionary work took only two years after the Pentecostal revival came to Norway in 1906, with missionaries journeying to India, China, Africa and South America. The first missionaries were Dagmar Engstrøm (Gregersen) and Agnes Beckdal (Thelle), who went to India. About the same time missionaries were sent to Swaziland, China, Argentina and India.

Pentecostals created a Norwegian missionary organization in 1915 under the name Norges Frie Evangeliske Missionsforbund—'Norwegian Free Evangelical Mission Association' (renamed Norges Frie Evangeliske Hedningemission 'Norwegian Free Evangelical Heathen Mission', or NFEH, in 1920). For theological reasons, related to the Pentecostal movement's self-understanding as consisting of entirely independent and autonomous churches, NFEH was closed in 1930 and the associated mission closed in 1932. The movement's founder in Norway and foremost leader, Thomas Ball Barratt, who had advocated the establishment of the organization, was also the deciding vote when the organization was disbanded.

Missionary commitment was not weakened by this. New work was started in Paraguay and Brazil, and several missionaries were sent to established mission fields in Asia and Africa. In India the Pentecostal missionaries work in the four fields of eleven stations. In China, most of the activities are in the former province of Chahar northwest of Beijing. In particular, the work in the Congo has been central to the Pentecostal Foreign Mission of Norway.

=== Timeline ===
- 1939—the Pentecostal Foreign Mission of Norway had seventy missionaries.
- 1973—there were about 230 active missionaries, and fifty candidates waiting to go abroad.
- 1983—there were about 350 active missionaries in thirty countries, and 70-80 candidates waiting to go abroad.
- 2006—there were about 172 missionaries in service—92 active missionaries, and 81 in Norway.

== Europe ==
In Europe, the Pentecostal Foreign Mission of Norway works in Belgium, Spain, Austria, Germany, Romania, Turkey and Albania.

== Eastern Europe and Western Asia (Eurasia) ==
The Pentecostal Foreign Mission of Norway has mission work in Russia, Ukraine, Belarus, Georgia and Uzbekistan. Many countries in Eurasia have adopted a religion that makes it difficult for foreign Christian missionaries to engage in missionary work in the country.

== Africa ==
In Africa, the Pentecostal Foreign Mission of Norway undertakes missionary work in the Congo, Niger, Kenya, Mozambique, Swaziland, South Africa and Uganda.

In 1909, the Mission sent Laura Beach to Swaziland. Anna Østereng from Bastad in Østfold went to South Africa in 1910.

=== Congo ===
In 1921, members of the Norwegian and Swedish Pentecostal Mission, namely Oddbjørg and Gunnerius Tollefsen, Hanna Veum (later married to Charles Moody) and A. B. Lindgren were sent to the Belgian Congo. The assignment was to take a mission field in the country, which at that time had some Protestant Christian activities. They met resistance from the established Catholic Church, local chiefs and from some of the prevailing religions in the country. The Colonial Powers allowed them to start a mission station in Sibatwa, a mountainous area north of Tang Anika Sea. After six months they left when the population became extremely hostile to the missionaries. The Swedish and Norwegian missionaries agreed that it was best for them to separate.

After a few more failed attempts, the Norwegian missionaries ultimately managed to establish a mission in the region of the Bushi people. They found a bog in the Kaziba and here began the first Norwegian Pentecostal work in 1922. Malaria was a major problem, and there were few native-born people in the area. The local governor figured that the missionaries would leave shortly, but they did not. By 24 September 1922, a simple place of worship was consecrated. 600 people showed up, including several local chiefs. In the course of one year, ten Congolese were baptized. The Pentecostals in Norway sent another eight missionaries. Missionary work spread quickly and several small outposts grew. The people in the area were illiterate, and there were no school facilities. Schooling was started in many places. The sick came to the mission station to get help with wound treatment, intestinal worms and malaria infections. Women received midwife care at home.

During the Second World War, there were six Norwegian missionaries in the Congo with no financial support from Norway. Despite difficult times, a revival began. After the war, Norway sent more missionaries. At its peak there were nearly 50 PYM Norwegian missionaries in the mission field.

In 1960 at the field conference, they decided that the mission work was to be led by a council of missionaries and leaders of the local church in the country. Local Congolese church members also took over responsibility for all primary schools.

The work in the Congo received a name: French: Communauté des Églises libres de Pentecôte en Afrique or CELPA, the Association of Free Pentecostal churches in Africa. The leadership structure was changed. Work was left to the Congolese and there was only one missionary, designated as an advisor to the steering committee. The churches were added to 13 districts, totaling six regions. In 1999 there were only four to five Norwegian missionaries left in the Congo, the work having been left to the locals. CELPA sent out its first missionaries to foreign countries—to Niger.

In 1991, the country had democracy and freedom of expression for the first time, after having been subject to an authoritarian colonial government for 60 years (1901–1961) and 30 years of dictatorship (1961–1991). These were years of unrest and war in Congo. The missionaries had to leave the country several times from the 1960s to 1998. There was widespread violence, oppression, assault, pillaging, and mass murder. Many missionaries experienced war up close. The only network that worked in the country were Christian churches including the Catholic Church and CELPA. They managed to keep schools and health care open, even if the government structure collapsed.

In 2003, there was a fragile peace in Congo. The warring parties in the Second Congo War that had escalated into a major African war with major Global operators, had to some extent withdrawn and calmed down. Between three and four million people had been killed and churches in the Congo began the reconstruction of the country.

Today CELPA has nearly 400,000 baptized members. It has built hundreds of schools and a hospital. They run Bible schools and a theological institute. CELPA has also sent missionaries to Niger, Rwanda, Tanzania and Somalia.

== East Asia ==
The Pentecostal Foreign Mission of Norway operates in India, Japan, Nepal, China, Pakistan, Burma, Philippines, Singapore, Thailand and Cambodia.

=== Japan ===
The Örebro Mission (Swedish) started with a Bible course in Kobe during 1957 and opened a Bible Institute in 1961. Norwegian Pentecostals joined in 1968. The school building in Kobe was partly destroyed in an earthquake some time ago, but has been partially renovated. The school is overcrowded and is planning expansion. In Katsuyama a new Pentecostal church was established.

=== Pakistan ===
In Pakistan, the Pentecostal Foreign Mission of Norway cooperated with the Full Gospel Assemblies of Pakistan (FGA), in areas concerning the mission, school education, healthcare and targeted efforts to improve the situation of women and children. There is much illiteracy, especially among women. They established Full Gospel Church Multan and churches in Latifabad.

=== India ===
The Norwegian Pentecostal Mission has been engaged in India since 1910. Agnes Beckdal (née Thelle) and Dagmar Engstrøm (née Gregersen) were sent there. They had heard the words Banda, Banda, when they were called (presumably by God) and they understood this was their call to travel. On the map, they found out where God had called them, a small town southeast of New Delhi, in India. Later Henrik Engstrøm travelled to Banda and was engaged to Dagmar. They married in India.

In 1942 the couple Gerd and Robert Bergsaker travelled to India.

=== Thailand ===
The first Protestant missionaries arrived in Thailand in 1828, and in 1946 the first Pentecostal missionaries arrived from Finland. A few years later the first Pentecostal missionaries arrived from Norway and Sweden, and also later from Denmark. In the late 1960s and early 1970s, many new missionaries arrived from Scandinavia, and in 1972 the Scandinavian Pentecostal Mission (SPM) was formed as a collaboration between the Scandinavian Pentecostal mission and the Örebro mission.

Today there are over thirty churches in Thailand, and as a result of this mission work, most churches are independent nationwide. Churches in southern Thailand have formed a community church known as the Fellowship of the Full Gospel Churches in Thailand (FCT). Scandinavian Pentecostal missions began in Bangkok with radio and TV work. Today, driven by national efforts, it has significant support from Ibra media.

Few Norwegian Pentecostal missionaries work directly in Thailand, but the Norwegian Pentecostal Mission continues to support the work financially. In the border areas between Thailand and Burma, missionaries Mario and Mariann Lao worked among the Shan people, whom originally came from Burma. Many are refugees in Thailand. In Bangkok, Anne Christensen conducted missionary work at orphanages which now house forty-two children.

=== Nepal ===
Robert Bergsaker was a pioneer missionary in Nepal who went there for the first time in 1949. Nepal was at that time closed to Christian missions. He had the opportunity to work in the country as part of an American scientific research expedition. At the time there had not previously been any Christian missions; he therefore considered there to be no Christians in the country.

In 1957, Nepal was opened to Christian missions that were willing to carry out social work. The Norwegian Pentecostal Mission cooperated with the United Mission to Nepal and obtained government approval to conduct its work in the country. The first task was to establish a mission hospital in Bhadgaon. Later, several missionary organizations sent missionaries to the country and today there are about 700,000 Christians in Nepal.

=== Singapore ===
Sherry and Eyvind Møller had Singapore as a base for customer service mainly in Asia.

=== China ===
China was one of the first countries to which the Norwegian Pentecostal mission sent missionaries. In 1910, brothers Henry and Parley Gulbrandsen sailed to China. In China, most activity was in the former province of Chahar northwest of Beijing.

In 1949, chairman Mao Zedong came to power in China and over five thousand missionaries, from sixty different religious groups, were thrown out of the country. All Christians in China were only permitted to gather in public church chapels for worship services referred to as the Three-Self Patriotic Movement and commonly called the Three-Self Church. This church was monitored and controlled by the Communist state of China. Between 1966 and 1976, during the Cultural Revolution, all religions, including the Christian faith, were prohibited. Christians were persecuted in China and particularly hard hit were the church leaders.

The thousands of Christians in prison had small worship communities where it was possible. In their homes, Christians started to gather in secret. After the Cultural Revolution, there were about 50 million Christians, and they could again gather in their own places of worship. The official Three-Self Church was under the control of the authorities, while the house churches a retained a large network of underground churches. The number of Christians in China was estimated to increase by about thirty thousand each day. There was an enormous need for Bible teachers and Bibles. In the 1980s, China opened more to receive Western expertise and especially to foreign trade. Today, the Norwegian Pentecostal missionary enthusiasm for China is based mostly on intercession and helping with Bible distribution. Bibles are printed both overseas and in China. With an increase of tens of thousands believing in Jesus each day, the requirements for Bibles are enormous.

== Latin America ==
The Pentecostal Foreign Mission of Norway has mission work in Paraguay, Bolivia, Peru, Brazil, Chile, Guatemala, El Salvador, Honduras, Mexico, Trinidad and Argentina.

=== Paraguay ===
In Paraguay, the Norwegian Pentecostal missionary work was established in 1957 when Ruth Kjellås, Gunvor Johansen (married to Iversen) and Bergljot Nordmoen (married to Nordheim) crossed the border from Brazil. They settled in Sao Jeronimo and established a mission among the Guarani tribe in Paso Cadena.

=== Peru ===
In Peru, the Pentecostal Foreign Mission of Norway is engaged in the Piura region. Missionaries Gro and John Ager Stone, Eva and Rudolf Wilhelm have undertaken long services in Peru. The Pentecostal Movement (Casas de Oración) in the area consists of eighty churches and comprises 3,300 members. Together with the cooperation of local Pentecostal churches and the Global Mission Line, a missionary training school building was constructed.

== Israel ==
The Pentecostal Foreign Mission of Norway work in Israel is called the Norwegian Pentecostal Friends' work in Israel (NPAI), working on projects related to the maintenance and improvement of health institutions. NPAI also helps elderly Israelis who fall outside the public social networks. Beit Betania ('the Bethany home') is where the administrative work is run from.

== Literature ==
- Parley Gulbrandsen:Greetings from China, 1926
- Parley Gulbrandsen:Some Thoughts Wed outer mission and a brief overview of Pentecostal friends' mission field,Oslo: Filadelfia, 1939
- Willy Rudolph:From the war, Japan-China: Missionary Willy Rudophs experiences, London: the Philadelphia publishing house, 1938
- Willy Rudolph:I'm going tomorrow, Oslo, 1950
- Arnulf Solvoll:Chinaup close, London: the Philadelphia Press, 1948 (re-release thatChina up close,Hovet: Hermon, 1995
- Ivar Witzøe M. (ed.):The open doors: The free evangelical hedningemissions workers and work through 10 years, Larvik: Hedningemissionen, 1925
- The Norwegian Pentecostal Church. Gospel to everyone.No. 2, 2002.
- The Norwegian Pentecostal Church. Gospel to all. Congo in Transition.No. 1, 2004.
- His Myrvold. 2005. Tentmakers. Cross wins, 17 June 2005.
- the Norwegian Pentecostal Church
- PYMs work in Asia
- PYMs Kids Help
- rudolf-l/Guarani/gunvor_iversen_1998.htm Iversen, Gunvor. 1998. PYMswork in Paraguay 1998 XI. Cross wins, 1998.
- Johansen, Oddvar. 2006a. Missionarieson one-way ticket. Cross wins. 2. June 2006, p. 30-31.
- Johansen, Oddvar. 2006b. Have spread throughout the world. Cross wins. 15. December 2006, p. 12-13.
- Johansen, Oddvar; Hagen, Kjell; Nyen, Astrid Neema; Kolbjørnsrud, Paul and Filberg, Trond. 2010. In all the world. Pentecostal Mission in 100 years. PYM 100 years 1910-2010(anniversary writing) The Norwegian Pentecostal Church (PYM).
