= Maran Ata =

Norwegian Christian denomination

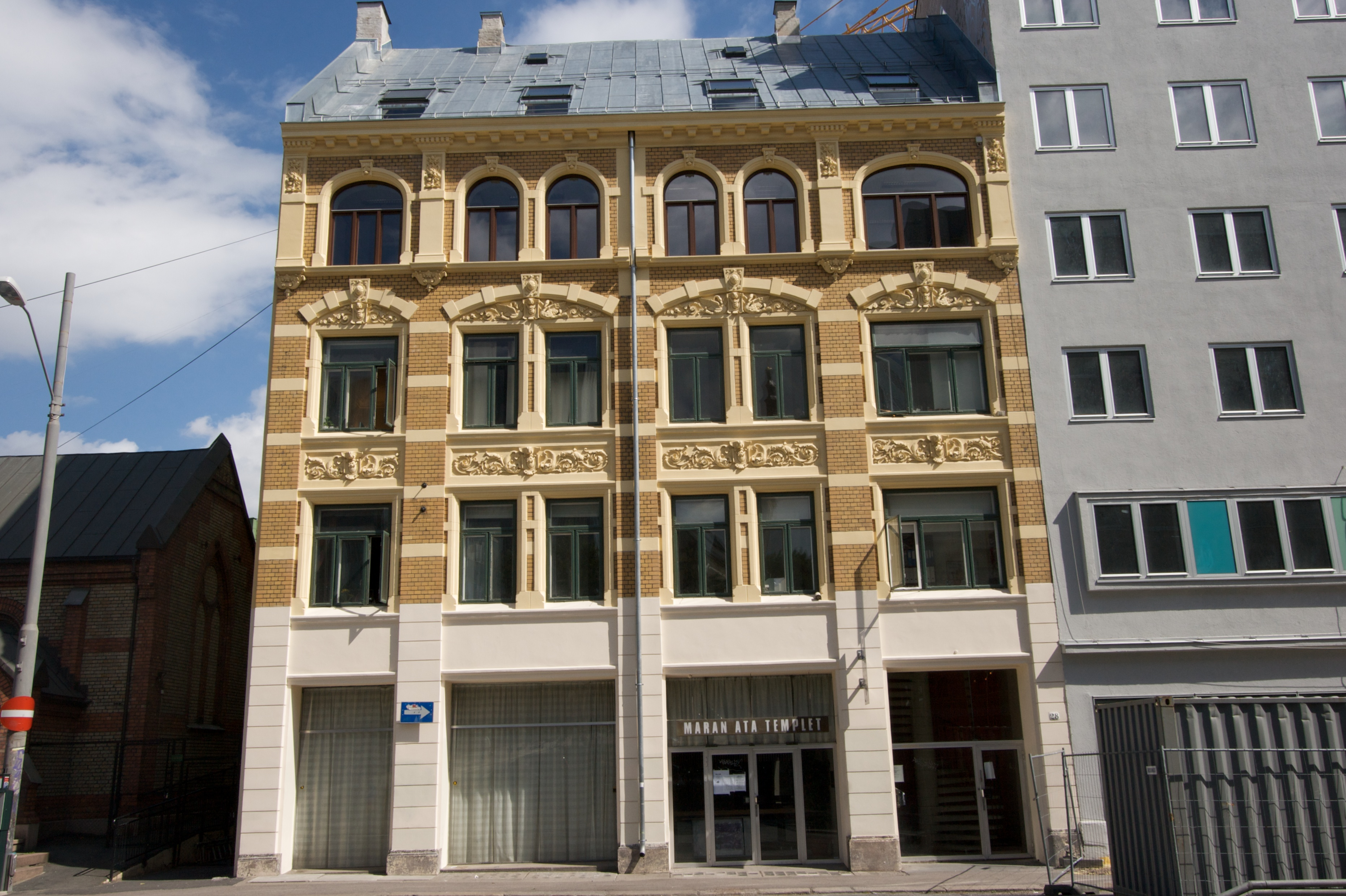
Maran Ata Temple on Møllergata in Oslo. To the left is St. Edmund's Church.

Maran Ata is a Norwegian free church Christian denomination or faith community (trossamfunn) founded by Charismatic minister Aage Samuelsen in 1958–1959. The denomination consists of several congregations. Maran Ata is known for its music and a direct and challenging proclamation of salvation.

The word Maran ata is Aramaic and means 'our Lord is coming', and is taken from the Apostle Paul's First Epistle to the Corinthians in the New Testament in the Christian Bible, chapter 16, verse 22.

== History ==
After preacher Aage Samuelsen was forced out of the Norwegian Pentecostal movement in July 1957, he decided to found his own church, Maran Ata. Its name was taken from the Pentecostal hymnal Maran Ata, published in 1911 by Norwegian Pentecostal founder Thomas Ball Barratt.

Samuelsen founded the first Maran Ata congregation in Skien in 1958 and the Oslo congregation on 10 October 1959. Several other congregations would also be founded.

After several years, however, there was a rift between him and the movement. He received criticism for his alcohol abuse, among other things. The media eventually revealed in 1966 that he had been drinking at a party in Copenhagen – "he was said to have drunk up the collection money" – leading to his expulsion from the church the following year.

The movement reached a high point in activity in the 1960s and gained a large number of members. The number of members today is believed to be relatively low – as of 2004, there were only approximately 60 active members.

After the break with Samuelsen, businessman Petter Gylver (1918–1999) became the movement's "undisputed leader" until his death.

Maran Ata faced controversy in the 1960s due to its practice of healing through prayer, often in combination with fundraising. Pentecostal leaders and preachers criticized the movement, and some Pentecostal leaders went public and referred to its healing meetings as "ecstasy, fanaticism and falsification".

The Maran Ata congregations published their own songbook, Sildigregn, in 1964. In addition to the most popular, classic Christian songs, there were also many lyrics written by the movement's own songwriters, primarily Samuelsen. The songbook is currently available in seven editions.

The movement was also the inspiration for the Swedish Maranata movement.

== Organization ==
The movement consists of independent local congregations and "gatherings of friends". It is led nationally under the name Maran Ata Norge.

Maran Ata holds a national conference every year, which also serves as the church's supreme decision-making body. The national conferences are attended by representatives from the congregations and the gatherings of friends. At the national conference the national board is elected. The congregation also has a national meeting at Dyrsku'n in Seljord Municipality, in addition to a spring and autumn meeting.

Tarjei Draugedal from Kviteseid Municipality has been its leader since 2003.

== Teachings ==
Maran Ata's aim is to preach the gospel as it is written in Mark 16:15–20: "And he said to them, 'Go into all the world and preach the gospel to all people. Whoever believes and is baptized will be saved, but whoever does not believe will be condemned. And these signs shall follow them that believe: In my name shall they cast out devils, and shall speak new tongues, and shall take up serpents in their hands; and if they drink deadly poison, it shall not hurt them. They shall lay hands on the sick, and they shall recover'."

The church describes themselves as "stand[ing] united behind a biblical foundation". This means being "born again to a life with Jesus Christ", after "repentance from sin". The church practices baptism according to the Baptist view of baptism (full immersion). Similar to the Pentecostal churches, speaking in tongues (glossolalia) is also practiced. This is seen as a sign that the person has received (been baptized in) the Holy Spirit.

Prayer for the sick and suffering is seen as an important part of the church's work, and is seen as a "gift of mercy received from God". The church is also actively involved in missions work.

== Missions work ==
According to the website of the Oslo congregation, Maran Ata runs several missions projects. These include Sarons Rose Misjon, Trosgnisten and Fullevangelisk Misjon.

In Puerto Rico their support includes Sarons Rose Misjon, which was founded by Sally Olsen in 1952 and is involved in aid work and evangelism among children and prisoners.

The church cooperates with Trosgnisten Misjon, which runs aid projects in a number of countries. The work includes evangelism, support for missionaries and a large child sponsorship program. The work covers a number of countries, such as Kenya, India, Uganda, Ecuador, Congo, Tanzania, Rwanda, the Philippines and Ukraine.

In Latin America, the church also supports missionary and evangelist Kolbjørn Granseth from Fullevangelisk Misjon.

== Internal conflict ==
The active collection of money in the 1960s and 1970s made it possible for the Oslo congregation to become the owner of a building complex on Møllergata, the Maran Ata Temple. This is run as a stock corporation. After Gylver's death in 1999, there was a dispute between the old and new members of the congregation regarding the operation and ownership of the congregation's property, and how Gylver's powers should be administered.

== Today ==
In 2006, Maran Ata found itself realigning with the broader Norwegian Pentecostal movement, when "[its] pastors participated in the [annual] Pentecostal preachers' conference with full voting rights".
