= Pentecostalism in Norway =

Norwegian Christian denomination

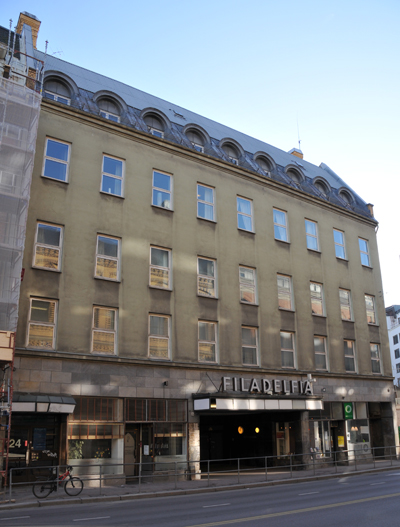
- Filadelfia in St. Olavs street, Oslo.
- Classification: Pentecostalism
- Region: Norway
- Origin: 1907
- Members: 39,590

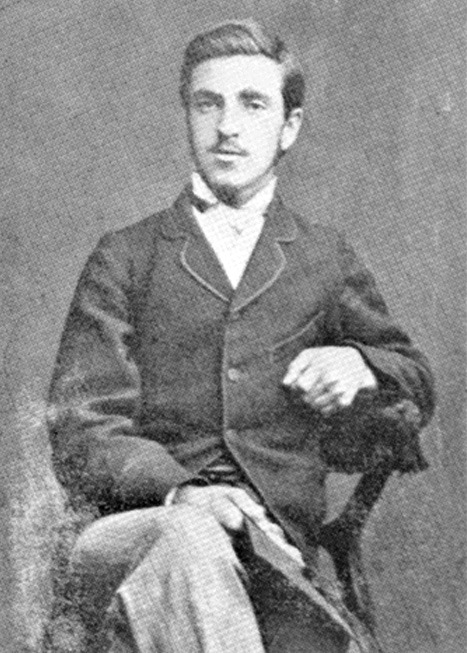
Thomas Ball Barratt brought Pentecostalism to Norway.

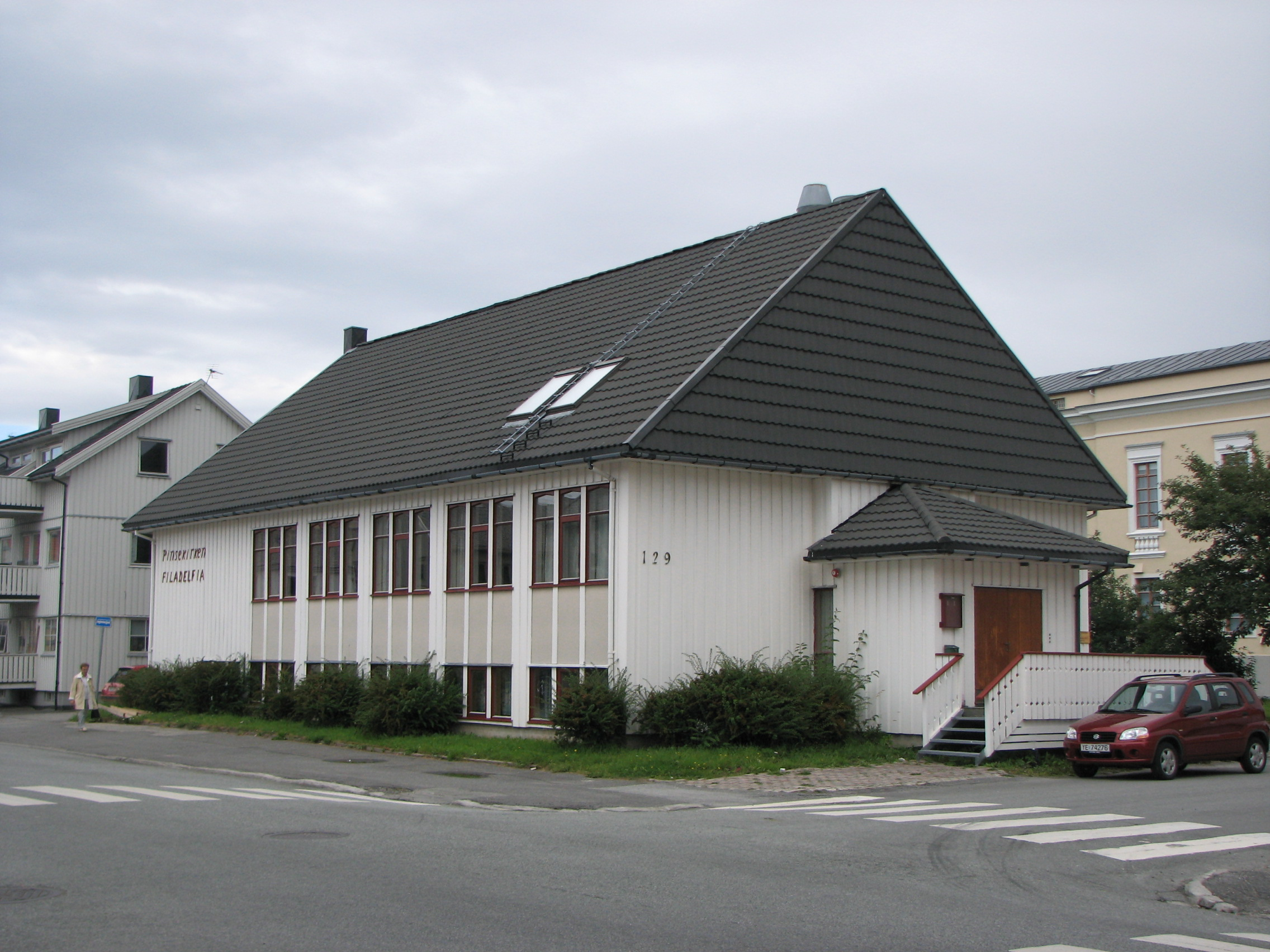
The church Filadelfia in Bodø.

Pentecostal congregations in Norway (Norwegian: Pinsemenigheiter [lit. 'Pentecostal congregations'], Pinsevenner [lit. 'Pentecostal friends'], and Pinsebevegelsen [lit. 'the Pentecostal movement']) is the largest Protestant free church in Norway with a total membership of 40,725 people in 2020.

Year	Pentecostals	Percent
1980	42,518	1.04%
1990	43,471	1.02%
2000	45,006	1.04%
2005	42,744	0.92%
2009	39,590	0.82%

The Pentecostal movement in Norway is a Christian movement. It is not a single organized unit, but consists of a community of 340 independent churches (free churches). The Norwegian Pentecostal movement runs humanitarian work, schools and missions in about 30 countries.

The Pentecostal movement follows a biblical, radical Christian teaching. The beliefs of water baptism and baptism in the Holy Spirit are the characteristics of the Pentecostal movement, and this is perceived as the greatest difference between Pentecostals and, for example, Lutherans. Pentecostal gatherings are often held in simple rooms with few religious decorations. A congregation is not considered the church building itself, but rather the Christian community. In Norway, the Gospel Centre is the largest joint initiative in the movement.

Thomas Ball Barratt brought the Pentecostal movement to Norway in 1907. Barratt did not want to establish a new Christian movement, but rather wanted the Christian communities to be renewed. That was not the case, and he became the founder of the Pentecostal movement in Norway. Barratt was active in Sweden, Denmark and England, and when he visited Denmark in 1907, it sparked the beginning of the Danish Pentecostal movement. Barratt was a key figure in the establishment of the Pentecostal movement in several European countries, particularly Sweden and England.

== Prevalence ==
Public statistics show that the Norwegian Pentecostal movement has about 40,000 baptized members, and additionally, approximately 10,000 children of members. The number of members has remained stable over the past few years.

There are 340 Pentecostal churches in Norway. Most are located in traditional church buildings, but in recent years less-traditional church buildings have also been built, such as Jesus Church, which is a church aimed at youth.

The Pentecostal movement is considered among the world's fastest growing religious movements, with 600 million members.

The term Pentecostal movement covers the wider community. The Pentecostal movement worldwide is large and consists of many quite different free church congregations, organizations and societies, including the charismatic movement, the Jesus Movement, Baptists, the Word of Faith Movement, the Oasis Movement and many others. The term Pentecostal movement is used to refer to the community of Pentecostal churches with historical roots in the beginning of the Pentecostal revival. Their followers are called Pentecostals.

The Free Evangelical Fellowship, or de frie venner ('the free friends') as they are also called, are considered by many as part of the Pentecostal movement. Historically, there have been some slight differences in the view of baptism in the Holy Spirit (spirit baptism). There are several other Pentecostal directions which in doctrine and practice are similar to Pentecostal movement, but which have a slightly different background and somewhat different teachings. These include the Word of Faith Movement and Maran Ata.

== History ==
The Pentecostal movement's roots go back to the Holiness Movement, which made its mark in America in the 19th century, but it was in 1906 that the Pentecostal movement and baptism of the Holy Spirit made a worldwide breakthrough at the revival on Azusa Street in Los Angeles. The Pentecostal revival of the early 1900s affected many established denominations, focusing on Jesus Christ, the key teachings of the Bible, and the Holy Spirit. Personal life as a Christian was also central and was expressed in an increased need for evangelism, prayer, and the use of spiritual gifts.

The term Pentecostal church was first used in the early 1900s by various congregations concerned with revival.

The baptism of the Spirit, as it was called, and Pentecostal revival came to Norway with Methodist priest Thomas Ball Barratt's return from the United States in December 1906. He had been on a fundraising trip for the construction of a building in Kristiania, now Oslo. Barratt had longed for something he called "the purification of the heart" and the baptism of the Spirit, and when he was in the United States he happened upon the magazine The Apostolic Faith which discussed this. From New York, where he stayed, he made contact with the spiritually baptized in Los Angeles, which changed his life. Some time later he himself experienced "being filled with the spirit" and the ability to speak in tongues.

== Spiritual baptism in Norway ==
When Barratt came to Kristiania in December 1906, it marked the beginning of several revival meetings with speaking in tongues. When Barratt stood at the podium in the gymnasium in Kristiania on 23 December 1906 and told of his spiritual baptism, he wept. This was the first meeting after his return, and although he did not utter a word, it was of great importance: the Spirit was present. The day after Christmas, more people came to experience similar things. By New Year 1907, ten people had been baptized in the Spirit. This is considered the beginning of the Pentecostal movement in Norway.

The meetings aroused great curiosity, and many often sought out the long meetings. People were saved or experienced a renewed Christian life. But many Christians were sceptical of Barratt's baptism in the Spirit, and the new revival faced strong opposition and criticism, in which the spiritually baptized were laughed at as religious fanatics. This contributed to the spread of the revival.

Initially, there was no set schedule or program at the meetings. The main content was likely to have been song, prayer and messages in the Spirit through speaking in tongues or prophetic speech. At first, there was no preaching in an orderly form. The Pentecostal movement at the beginning was more subjective and impulsive than, and in great contrast to, the more set form of church meeting among the Lutherans. Eventually preaching became central to the gatherings.

== Revival and stagnation ==
Despite ridicule and resistance, the Pentecostal movement grew rapidly. New congregations were formed mainly in southern and eastern Norway, and especially in Telemark. Church planting or establishing business in new places has always been central to the movement. When new congregations are established, so-called outposts are formed. These are not independent churches or denominations, but are subject to the parent church.

From New Year 1907 the revival in Kristiania spread with great speed throughout the country. In many places, regular meetings began. Barratt did not want to establish a new Christian movement, but rather wanted renewal in Christianity. That was not the case, and he became the founder of the Pentecostal movement in Norway.

Throughout the 1930s, Norway was characterized by revivals in several places. This affected a number of churches and denominations and was a period of growth for the entire Christian community in Norway.

From 1945, after the war, growth stagnated. This period was marked by a deeper and more personal dedication to prayer and fasting.

In 1937, thirty years after its establishment, there were 16,783 Pentecostals in Norway. At the 50th anniversary in 1957, there were 249 Pentecostal churches with 26,474 Pentecostals in Norway. In 2007, the figure was about 42,000, if children are included as well.

== Dissenter Act ==
The Dissenter Act restricted those who were not members of the State Church. The dissenters did not have full civil rights and at the same time were given some special duties. Dissenters were banned from several professions and faced, among other things, a ban on working as a teacher, nurse, civil servant, judge or minister. This led to a kind of "ghetto existence" for members of the free churches. This treatment made them feel disregarded by society.

Gradually, the law changed somewhat, and the distinction between dissenters and the other Norwegian citizens decreased. In 1969, the Dissenter Act was abolished, and the concept of dissent disappeared from Norwegian law. At the same time, the Norwegian constitution was amended to give full religious freedom in Norway.

== Churches ==
On 18 May 1908, the first Norwegian Pentecostal church was founded in Skien. It was called Tabernaklet ('the Tabernacle'). The background for the foundation of the congregation was pastor C. M. Seehuus' break with the Baptist congregation in Skien, a congregation which he himself led.

From 1910, several already-established congregations joined the movement, including Berøa Oslo, Betel Nærsnes, Filadelfia Skiptvet and Betania Kongsberg.

As late as 1916, almost ten years after its establishment in Norway, the first Pentecostal church in Kristiania was founded. It had 200 members, and the congregation had held meetings in various rented premises since 1910. Today it is called Filadelfia Oslo. The new Filadelfia was inaugurated in 1938 after a major rebuild. Filadelfia Oslo is the Norwegian Pentecostal movement's largest congregation.

Throughout the 1920s many new congregations were formed in several places in Norway, due to the impression of God's intervention in life and that the spiritual gifts, as described by the first Christian churches, were again in use.

== Missionary work ==
The Pentecostal Foreign Mission of Norway conducts missionary work in more than 30 countries on four continents. Missionary work has always been central to the Norwegian Pentecostal movement, which has 300 active missionaries, of which approximately 140 are currently abroad. They have estimated that 300 million NOK are spent on mission purposes abroad.

In 1910, the first missionaries were sent to China (Henry and Parley Gulbrandsen), India (Dagmar Engstrøm and Agnes Beckdal), and Argentina.

In 1915, a mission organization by the name of Norges Frie Evangeliske Missionsforbund ('the Free Evangelical Missionary Federation') was founded by T.B. Barratt. In 1920 the name was changed to Norges Frie Evangeliske Hedningemission ('Norway's Free Evangelical Heathen Mission). In 1929 Barratt pushed for its dissolution, which happened in 1932. From then on, it is the individual churches themselves that have been responsible for the missionaries being dispatched. The movement later did not have any joint mission organization with responsibility for missionary activities.

The Norwegian Pentecostal Church's External Mission (De norske pinsemenigheters ytremisjon, PYM) is an office that coordinates practical things for missionaries, such as an overview of mission projects, Norwegian Agency for Development Cooperation (Norad) support, visa applications, airline tickets and more.

In 1922, the first Pentecostal missionaries were sent to the Congo, and after a somewhat difficult establishment, this became a major mission field. The missionary work in Congo was given its own name, CELPA, in 1995, at the same time as the national organization took over.

In 1983, there were approximately 350 active missionaries in 30 countries and 70–80 graduates waiting to travel.

== Conflicts and reconciliation ==
In the late 1950s, Aage Samuelsen left the movement and formed the church Maran Ata in Oslo. A few years later there was a split with Aril Edvardsen and the organization Troens Bevis (Evidence of Faith) in Kvinesdal.

Several conflicts arose in the 1980s and 1990s due to Word of Faith preaching in the Pentecostal movement. One of the more striking characters is Åge Åleskjær, who started his own megachurch, Oslo Kristne Senter, outside the Pentecostal movement in 1985. In the mid-1990s, reconciliation came between Pentecostalism, the Faith Movement, Åge Åleskjær, Evidence of Faith and Aril Edvardsen. The latter forms a separate branch. Aage Samuelsen's many songs are of great importance to the movement.

== Credo ==
The Bible's words are interpreted to be true: that everything in it is true, a recognition of the entire Bible as God's holy and infallible word. At the same time, it is acknowledged that humankind does not understand everything or can fully explain all relationships. With the help of the Holy Spirit, however, Christians can gain a clearer understanding and greater understanding of what is written. The Pentecostal movement does not use explanatory or other scripture besides the Bible. The Pentecostal movement believes in the Bible's revelation of God as the only One, the Father (spirit), the Son (the spirit robed in flesh), and the Holy Ghost (God's spirit poured out and the infilling of believers). The return of Jesus, the last days, and the Millennium play an important role.

The baptism of the Spirit (baptism in the Holy Spirit) is an early Christian phenomenon, and first appeared on Pentecost in Jerusalem, following Jesus' ascension to heaven. The disciples were gathered. Then the Spirit fell upon them, and some disciples became bold apostles. The baptized Christians received greater boldness and joy, and they also received spiritual gifts that were a manifestation of God's presence.

Speaking in tongues is considered a prayer language that is used when one wants to pray not only with one's own thoughts and words, but also with one's spirit. However, speaking in tongues is not necessarily seen as being equally important for everyone.

Salvation is understood as an active act on the part of God. The relationship between God and the human race was lost during the Fall of Adam. Through the sacrificial death of Jesus Christ on the cross and resurrection, God restores the relationship between himself and the human race. All this happens through personal faith, which is a gift of God.

Communion has a central place in the service life of the movement, in commemoration and proclamation of the atoning death of Christ. The Lord's Supper refers to a deep union between Christ and His church.

Baptism is a baptism with full immersion in water, called believing baptism. Baptism is a voluntary choice. Baptism is an act that is done on the basis of faith and conviction. Baptism is a covenant of conscience between one who is baptized and God. For young children it is common to have a child blessing, which is not considered a baptism.

The Pentecostal movement has always had a social commitment to the poor and the excluded. This is done through relief work and collections. The missionary activity has focused on building schools, health services and taking care of the language and culture of each country.

The Pentecostal movement has a conservative view of sexuality and cohabitation.

The Pentecostals emphasize the idea that the Jews are God's chosen people, and are therefore Israel-friendly. Some give their support to Zionism.

Pentecostals have no particular celebration for Pentecost, although the first Pentecost, when the Holy Spirit fell upon the disciples, is central to the movement. They celebrate Christmas and Easter.

The Pentecostal view of the Bible as God's word has been one of the reasons why they have been largely dismissive of the World Council of Churches because they believe the ecumenical organization has too liberal a view of the Bible.

== Organization ==
Individual congregations are registered as independent religious communities with the county governor and make decisions independently. However, the different churches tend to maintain good relationships.

The organizational form of the congregations may vary. They often have a simple organization, modelled on the biblical Book of Acts, from the way the first Christian congregation was organized.

Many congregations are led by a pastor who works with several elders or deacons. Traditionally, the congregations have had only men in leadership positions, but today there are congregations that have female leaders. Female speakers are not uncommon.

== Membership ==
Individuals become members by enrolling in one particular congregation, preferably the local congregation where they live. Usually, they are required to proclaim their Christian faith to the congregation, and as a rule they must also be baptized. One can only be a member of one religious community (church).

Children in congregations who have grown up within the movement but who have not yet been baptized are referred to as belonging, while those who are baptized are referred to as members.

== Music ==
Music has played an important role since the beginning of the movement. The Pentecostal movement broke with the conservative view of religious music styles. The members of the Pentecostal movement had little to spare for the hymnals and chorales, which were associated with the church's liturgy and rituals. The music emphasized spiritual freedom and had a folksy, new and fresh style. Precisely this was likely the reason why the Pentecostal movement made great progress. The movement also received some criticism for the lack of quality in lyrics and melodies.

Solos, duets and smaller music groups have characterized the movement, but the music style and performance has changed significantly from the movement's beginnings in 1907.

Like the Methodists and the Salvation Army, it is not uncommon to see brass bands in the larger churches. Among the last such brass bands still in existence as of 2018 are the Salen Horn Orchestra in Halden, the Filadelfia Horn Orchestra in Filadelfia Drammen, founded in 1956, and Betel Brass in Trondheim, founded in 1958.

T.B. Barratt was a singer, composer, musician and songwriter. Many of his songs are found in the songbooks Maran ata and Evangelietoner. From the age of 18, Barratt translated and wrote songs and hymns. In 1887 he published the first songbook Evangeliske Sanger containing 96 of his own songs. Barratt published the songbook Maran ata in 1911, with 587 songs. Many of the songs were written by Barratt, either newly written or translated from English. The songbook Evangelietoner was first published in 1979.

The record company Klango was established early on and released a number of gramophone records. Among the most famous artists were Kjell and Odd, Milly and Oddny and Karsten Ekorness. Later, Filadelfiaforlaget released music on record and cassette. The name was later changed to REX Forlag AS, which has now been merged with Hermon Forlag.

Particularly in the 1950s, 1960s and 1970s, string music was both common and popular. These were smaller singing groups with stringed instruments. Mixed choirs or men's choirs were soon found in each church. Among the most well-known were probably the Filadelfia Choir in Oslo and Salem men's choir who were on par with the best in Norway. The lyrics were almost exclusively evangelical, and were about salvation, life and heaven.

In the 1980s and 1990s there was a period of many youth choirs and several released recordings. Betel String Music in Trondheim released three cassettes in the 1980s which were very popular.

From the mid-1990s, many of the lyrics have been characterized by more personal praise and worship. Dancing and drama groups with multimedia are becoming commonplace in youth environments.

== Joint initiatives ==
Norwegian Pentecostal churches have many joint organizations locally, nationally and internationally. This can entail mission work, care work, radio and television work, children's work and publications. Preachers meet for discussions and cooperation. Every year, key people meet at the Preachers' Conference for advice and inspiration.

Finnmark's first private health enterprise, Betania Alta, now called Stiftelsen Betania (Betania Foundation), was established in 1937. The task was to alleviate the social distress among Finnmark's population during the interwar years.

In 1952 the first mission boat was purchased, Misjonsbåten Fredsbudet or 'the Messenger of Peace mission boat'. It sailed along the Norwegian coast to smaller towns with the gospel. In 1980 it was replaced with a larger boat. In 2007, the boat was sold; the certification requirements and operating expenses became too extensive. It was remodeled and sailed under the name MS Vestgar.

In 1919, a Bible school was established in Møllergata in Oslo; this was the Norwegian Pentecostal Movement's first school. The school was intended for 100 students, but 400 met at school start. Later Bible schools or courses were established in several places in Norway. Hedmarktoppen, near Hamar, was first used as a convention site in 1954, while Hedmarktoppen Folkehøyskole was established in 1970, and later came Sandvik Folkehøyskole, now known as Helgeland Folkehøyskole. Betel Trondheim started Tomasskolen, a Christian elementary school, in 2000.

Stiftelsen Evangeliesenteret ('The Gospel Center Foundation') was founded in 1983 by Lise and Ludvig Karlsen. They were former drug addicts and felt a need to care for the community's outcasts. The first Gospel Center was opened in 1983 in a garage in Roa. The Gospel Center is Norway's largest private intervention in the field of substance abuse, and can accommodate 300 drug users at seven different centers around Norway. Hundreds have been given a new life.

The Pentecostal Children's and Youth Committee (PBU) coordinates the children's and youth work in the Pentecostal movement, publishes curriculum and organizes courses and conferences for leaders in children's and youth work.

The Pentecostal Leadership Council is a coordinating body. Its most important task is planning, conducting and following up the Pentecostal Preachers' Conference. It also processes referrals from public authorities, cross-Christian organizations and others. The leadership council strengthens the relationship between Pentecostal churches and takes initiatives to make the movement visible in Norway. Sigmund Terje Kristoffersen is the leader of the management council, elected in 2011.

== Radio and TV ==
IBRA Radio was established in 1955. The name was later changed to IBRA Media due to its expansion into TV broadcasts and the Internet. IBRA Media is one of the largest TV and radio stations in the world and is owned by the Nordic Pentecostal churches. Its purpose is to preach the gospel to unreached people groups. IBRA broadcasts radio and TV to 110 countries in 82 different languages. It is estimated that 100 million TV and radio viewers can receive broadcasts. Every day, IBRA receives thousands of listener and viewer responses to its programs. Each year, more than 250,000 people announce that they have received salvation as a direct result of listening to the programs. The IBRA is neutral politically and does not criticize other religions or religious communities.

Many Norwegian Pentecostal churches produce radio programs and many broadcast local radio in their regions. Starting in 1983, several congregations established local radio stations. Several of the Pentecostal local radio stations are among the oldest in Norway and were started just after the authorities ended the state broadcast monopoly in 1981.

Some larger congregations are engaged in television production. In 1990 Filadelfia Oslo launched a local television station in Oslo called Filadelfia TV. Today the company has been transferred to TV Inter AS, which produces Christian television programs. Egil Svartdahl's program Søndagsåpent signed its first major contract with TV2 in 1993.

== Publications ==
Barratt started the magazine Byposten as early as 1904, while serving as a pastor in the Methodist Church. The magazine changed its name in 1910 to Korsets Seier (The Victory of the Cross). Over time, the format and page numbers have changed and the magazine has taken on a more newspaper-like format. From the beginning, Korsets Seier has been the movement's mouthpiece. In 2019, it was purchased by the Christian newspaper Dagen; it is now distributed as a supplement.

Other publications included Lederskap, Livsglede, Evangeliet til alle (missions newsletter), Lys i Øst (about mission work in Eurasia), Sjibbolet (about the work of Norwegian Pentecostals in Israel), Nytt håp (about mission work in Mozambique), and Gode nyheter (about children's aid).

== Schools ==
The Pentecostal movement in Norway has several schools.

- Hedmarktoppen folkehøyskole, Hamar
- Helgeland Folkehøgskole, Mosjøen
- Norwegian School of Leadership and Theology
- Evangelisk Bibel-Seminar, Halden
- Filadelfia bibelskole (FBO), Oslo
- IMission bibelskole, Kristiansand
- MBS - menighetsbibelskolen, Sandefjord
- Hopen videregående skole, Eikefjord
- Bibelskolen i Trondheim, Trondheim
- Tomasskolen Trondheim Kristne Grunnskole
- Oasen barne- og ungdomsskole i Kristiansand

== Modern individuals ==
Some profiled modern individuals associated with Pentecostalism include evangelists such as Egil Svartdahl, Jørn Strand, Jan-Aage Torp and Levi Jensen.

== See also ==
- Christianity in Norway
