= Frisk Luft =

Norwegian gospel group

Frisk Luft ('Fresh Air') is a Norwegian gospel group.

It was founded in 1972 as Frisk Luft (Mot åndelig forurensning). It consisted of Rune Larsen, Ivar Skippervold, Arnold Børud and Kjell Fjalsett, and since all are accomplished musicians outside of the group as well, Frisk Luft was called the first Christian supergroup in Norway.

Frisk Luft released the album Gospel Live in 1973. The suffix, which means 'Against Spiritual Pollution', was dropped when the group released its second LP, Frisk Luft 2 in 1975. The group went inactive but made a comeback many years later, releasing Lifetime Friends in 2000 and I'll Never Find Another You in 2004.
