= Arnold Børud =

Norwegian musician and producer (born 1947)

- Born: 28 October 1947 (age 78); Askim, Norway
- Relatives: Thomas Børud (son); Ole Børud (son); Linda Børud (daughter)
- Awards: King's Medal of Merit
- Musical career
- Genres: CCM, gospel
- Occupations: Singer, musician, songwriter, record producer
- Instruments: Voice, guitar, piano, keyboards
- Years active: 1967–2025

Arnold Børud (born 28 October 1947) is a Norwegian singer, musician and record producer.

== Biography ==
He grew up in Askim Municipality and has been a devout Christian since the age of 18, when a friend invited him to a Christian camp. Only two years later, he had learned the guitar and piano and released his first record as a part of the duo Arild og Arnold. In 1973, he started two gospel choirs, Tvers and Mini-Tvers. With these choirs Børud became a pioneer in introducing gospel music to Norwegian Pietist congregations. He has thus been called "Mr. Gospel" in Norway.

He had already, in 1972, formed the gospel group Frisk Luft together with Rune Larsen, Ivar Skippervold and Kjell Fjalsett. The group formed by coincidence when Larsen and Børud, performing at Hedmarktoppen, spotted the already-known Fjalsett and Skippervold in the audience and invited them onto the stage. They released two LPs in the 1970s, and participated in a television show named Gospelkveld ('Gospel Evening'). Members of Tvers contributed on their first LP. Frisk Luft was said to be the first Christian supergroup in Norway.

=== Arnold B Family ===
In the 1980s, Børud performed with the group Børud-gjengen. It consisted of himself and his three children Thomas, Linda and Ole. The group was later expanded and renamed Arnold B. Family. Arnold B. Family participated in the Melodi Grand Prix three times, reaching as high as second place in 1995—behind Secret Garden with the song "Nocturne". Secret Garden would go on to win the Eurovision Song Contest 1995. Also, Frisk Luft made a public comeback in 1998, and released the record Lifetime Friends in 2000. In 2004, they followed with I'll Never Find Another You. Arnold Børud produced both albums. The group performs live every now and then.

Børud also contributed keyboards to the 1998 album Burial, the debut recording of Christian progressive death metal band Extol, of which his son Ole was a member. Besides his music career, Børud works for Normisjon at the Grimstad Bible School in Grimstad Municipality. In late 2007, he was awarded the HM The King's Medal of Merit in gold.

Arnold's wife, Anne Marie Børud died on 19 June 2025, at the age of 76.
