= Tor Magne Glidje =

- Also known as: Tor
- Born: Tor Magne S. Glidje; 27 September 1977 (age 49)
- Origin: Birkeland, Norway
- Genres: Christian metal; Progressive metal; Black metal; Experimental rock
- Occupation: Musician
- Instruments: Guitars, bass, vocals, percussion
- Years active: 1992–present

Tor Magne Glidje (born 27 September 1977) is a Norwegian guitarist in Extol, Ganglion and Longing, a.k.a. Lengsel, where he is also the lead singer. He was also a part of Benea Reach. He is now playing in the band Mantric.

== Background ==
Tor Magne Glidje grew up in the country side of Norway. Glidje would be exposed to music by way of Madonna, Bon Jovi and AC DC, and later Dio and Black Sabbath. Later, he grew to listen to black metal, death metal, and thrash metal, and began to learn guitars on his own to perform those styles.

Glidje began his musical career in the black metal band, Lengsel, which means Longing. Before forming this band, Glidje started to play with his now longtime friend and bandmate, Ole Sveen in 1992. Sveen and Glidje then formed the band, alongside John Robert Mjåland in 1994. The band had some success, signing with Solid State Records, based out of Seattle in the United States. After the departure of Eyestein Holm in 1999, Glidje joined Extol as their Bassist. In 2003, Glidje helped form Benea Reach with former Selfmindead members. Glidje left the same year of formation. Lengsel continued on for several years before going on a permanent hiatus in 2004, when Glidje re-joined, alongside Sveen and Mjåland, Extol.

Before the three joined Extol, Glidje and Sveen and Mjåland were in a side-project of Extol members Peter Espevoll and David Husvik, called Ganglion. The band merged with Extol after the departure of Christer Espevoll and Ole Børud. In 2007, Husvik and Espevoll put Extol on hiatus, while Glidje, Sveen, and Mjåland formed their project, Mantric. Glidje stated that "There are three Lengsel albums and we intend to make in the near future number four." as recently as 2015 in an interview for Mantric. In 2020, Mantric joined with Solid State Records and Tooth & Nail Records, which had been a prior home to Lengsel and Extol, and released their latest album, False Negative.

== Bands ==
Current

- Mantric – Rhythm Guitar, Vocals, Percussion (2007–present)

Hiatus

- Lengsel – Vocals, Guitars (1994–2004)

Former

- Extol – Bass (1999–2001), Guitar (2004–2007)
- Benea Reach – Guitar (2003)

== Discography ==
Lengsel

- Lengsel (1997)
- Solace (2000)
- The Kiss, the Hope (2006)

Extol

- Undeceived (2000)
- Paralysis (2001)
- The Blueprint Dives (2005)

Mantric

- The Descent (2010)
- Die Old (2015)
- Sin (2015)
- False Negative (2020)
