= Ghost Notes (Vardøger album) =

Studio album by Vardøger
- Released: November 24, 2015
- Recorded: 2010–2015
- Studio: Studio 19, Hamar, Norway; Space Valley Studio, Løten, Norway; East Lake Studio, Eina, Norway; Cuttingroom, Stockholm, Sweden
- Genre: Christian metal, melodic death metal, progressive metal
- Length: 48:57
- Label: Starbreather
- Producer: Robert Bordevik, Vardøger

Vardøger chronology
Whitefrozen (2003)	Ghost Notes (2015)

Ghost Notes is the debut studio album by the Norwegian Christian extreme metal band Vardøger, released on November 24, 2015. The album marked a departure from the band's previous unblack metal and Viking metal style, instead performing a broader mix of extreme metal, progressive metal, and melodic death metal. The album was met with a highly positive critical reception. In 2018, the members of Vardøger opted to disband.

== History ==
Vardøger formed in 1994 as a side project of its respective members. Nearly an album's worth of songs were recorded between 1995 and 1997, but, apart from a compilation appearance in 2000, no material was officially released from the band until 2003, when it released the extended play Whitefrozen through Endtime Productions. Vardøger then disbanded in 2006.

== Recording and packaging ==
Vardøger reformed in 2008 to start recording a full-length studio album. The band underwent a major line-up change in 2010, early in the recording process. About three years after the release Ghost Notes, the group again disbanded due to a lack of continuing interest from the constituent musicians. The album was recorded at Studio 19 in Hamar, Norway and Space Valley Studio in Løten, Norway. It was mixed in East Lake Studio in Eina, Norway, by Jon Anders Narum, and mastered at Cuttingroom in Stockholm, Sweden. Production was handled by Robert Bordevik as well as the rest of the band. The album design, illustration, and logo artwork were by Page Black, and the cover art made by Craig H. Jackson.

== Style ==
Previously, Vardøger was known for playing a folk-influenced Christian black metal and Viking metal. On this release, the band dramatically reinvented themselves, performing a style described as progressive extreme metal and melodic death metal. Although sung vocals are used extensively, the music on Ghost Notes is more complex, faster, heavier, and more extreme than that on Whitefrozen. The songs tend to contrast the vocal technique between verse and chorus, with Peter Dalbakk performing death growls in the verses and Knut Anders Sørum and Johanne B. Bordevik singing the choruses. The songs also will alternate between from complex, Opeth-style riffs to simple rock chords. In "Ctf", the guitar is performed in a grooving staccato. The opener "Amongst the Damned" begins with an "angry driving jackhammer" riff from a single guitar, punctuated by the rhythm section, and then is joined by a second guitar which lays a melodic line over the top. The song also features classical piano and female sung vocals. "Ghost Notes" includes a hook in the style of Megadeth, and the second half of "Shine" features Gojira-like guitar and vocals reminiscent of Herbrand Larsen of Enslaved. "Shine" also alternates black metal stanzas with choruses that are almost like pop music. "Amongst the Damned" contains touch of piano in addition to the heavy guitar riffs, and features surprising musical twists similar to those in the music from Kekal. "Crystal Sky" and "My Demon" introduce musical changes more slowly, similar to the work of Extol. "Ctf", "Revived", and "Grateful" switch to more simplified, straight-forward arrangements. Jakob Plantinga of Rocklife.nl was of the opinion that the album is stylistically diverse enough to equally appeal to fans of black metal, progressive metal, and avant-garde metal.

== Reception ==
Professional ratings
Review scores
Source	Rating
Hamar Arbeiderblad	5/6
Metalfan.nl	78/100
The Metal Resource	9/10
Rocklife.nl	9.5/10

The album was received very warmly critics. Kristian Einang from Hamar Arbeiderblad gave the album a "die throw" of 5/6. They considered the album powerful, captivating, and impressive, and though while at times overwhelming, still a compelling debut. Jeffrey of Metalfan.nl rated the album 78/100. They considered it a very pleasant record, although in their opinion the production could be more dynamic and the songwriting streamlined, and some of the songs suffer from being too busy. However, the different song sections still complement each other well. Rocklife.nl rated Ghost Notes 9.5/10, calling the record a "masterpiece." They summarized that, without a doubt, Vardøger delivered a very strong album, and that the only thing to be desired is for another album to be released soon. John Jackson of The Metal Resource rated the album nine out of ten, concluding that on Ghost Notes, the band created "one of the more inventive and powerful metal sounds I have heard in a long time."

== Track listing ==
All tracks are written by Robert Bordevik.

No.	Title	Length
1.	"Amongst the Damned"	5:08
2.	"Shine"	6:10
3.	"Call Your Name"	4:01
4.	"Crystal Sky"	4:30
5.	"My Demon"	4:30
6.	"Ctf"	4:19
7.	"Revived"	4:47
8.	"Grateful"	5:09
9.	"Ghost Notes"	6:23
10.	"Starbreather"	4:00
Total length:		48:57

== Personnel ==
=== Band ===
- Peter Dalbakk – Harsh vocals
- Alexander Dalbakk – Lead guitar on "Amongst the Damned", "Shine", "Crystal Sky", "Ctf", and "Revived", guitar technician
- Robert Bordevik – Rhythm guitar, lead guitar on "Amongst the Damned" and "Grateful", choir and background vocals
- Johannes Baumann – Drums
- Henning Ramseth – Bass, keyboards, synth, programming arrangements
- Bedevaart: Sung vocals
- Johanne B. Bordevik - Sung vocals

=== Additional personnel ===
- Vardøger – Production
- Robert Bordevik - Production
- John Huldt – Lead guitar on "Ghost Notes"
- "Hooligan" choir on "Starbreather": Andreas Langeland, Victor Baumann, Peter Dalbakk, Alexander Dalbakk, Lars Olav Gjøra, and Robert Bordevik
- Lars Olav Gjøra – Proofreading edits
- Jon Anders Narum – Mixing
- Page Black Design Bureau - Design, illustration, artwork
- Kine Jensen – Background photography
- Craig H. Jackson – Cover art photography
