= Selfmindead =

Swedish hardcore punk band

- Origin: Eskilstuna, Sweden
- Genres: Hardcore punk, black metal
- Years active: 1994–2003, 2014, 2016–present
- Labels: Solid State, Soulscape, Sally Forth
- Members: Ilkka Viitasalo; Marco Storm; Timo Sillankorva; Michal Bäckrud; Håkon Sverre Nakken
- Past members: Tapani Hoikkaniemi; Emil Nikolaisen; Tommy Akerholdt; Even Steven; Morten Holmquist; Ole Børud; Tor Erik Drangsland
- Website: selfmindead.com

Selfmindead was a hardcore punk band from Sweden.

== History ==
Selfmindead formed in the winter of 1994–1995 in Eskilstuna, Sweden as a four-piece consisting of drummer Marko Hautakoski, Timo Sillankorva on guitar, vocalist Ilkka Viitasalo, and bassist Tapani Hoikkaniemi. The Swedish hardcore scene and bands such as Refused, Abhinanda, and Mindjive influenced them. In 1995, the band won the Cult-95 competition. They began to play more shows around Sweden. In 1996, Selfmindead signed with Soulscape Records and released one 7", featuring two original songs and a cover of Starflyer 59's "Hazel Would". In the early summer of 1997, they recorded a self titled album, which Soulscape released in Scandinavia. Sally Forth Records distributed it in England and Benelux, and Solid State Records in the U.S. The group toured Europe to support the release.

At that time, Tapani left and was replaced with Emil Nikolaisen of Royal, Silver, and, later, Serena Maneesh. In the late Summer of 1999, Selfmindead recorded their follow-up full length, At the Barricades We Fall. Soulscape distributed this album in Scandinavia, Sally Forth in Europe, and Solidstate in the U.S. While writing At the Barricades We Fall, Emil left to pursue other interests. Marko switched to guitar. Tommy (Silver, Turbonegro) became drummer, and Even (Silver, Evil Eye) played bass. After touring as a five-piece, Even and Tommy left to work on their Silver project. After this, the band began looking for permanent members, and found Håkon from the band Mold on bass and Michal from the band Amphibro. During this time, the band rehearsed once a month due to Michal living over 700 km away. They toured Germany and Sweden.

A tour of the US followed in 2000, but due to complications, not all the members could make it to all the dates on this tour. A reserve system was put into place to solve this problem. Upon their return home they began the writing process for their third album. During this time they released a split EP with Dutch band The Spirit That Guides Us on Sally Forth which was distributed by Sony Music. The band played several festivals throughout Europe and played their last show at a club called "Blå" in their hometown of Eskilstuna in August 2002. The band finally called it quits on 22 March 2003, the same day Ilkka and Marco announced they formed a new band.

In 2003, Ilkka and Marco formed a new band in Norway known as Benea Reach and Timo started an electronic project known as Tiikeri.

The band in 2014, briefly reunited to play two shows in Norway with Mantric and Shevils. In 2016 the band was playing at Brainstorm Festival in the Netherlands on 12 November, with the lineup of Ilkka, Marco, Timo, Michal Bäckrud, and Håkon Sverre Nakken.

== Members ==
Current

- Ilkka "Volume" Viitasalo – vocals (1994–2003, 2014, 2016–present) (Benea Reach)
- Marko "Storm" Hautakoski – drums (1994–1999, 2002), guitar (1999–2003, 2014, 2016–present), backing vocals (1994–2003, 2014, 2016–present) (Benea Reach)
- Timo Sillankorva – guitar (1994–2003, 2014, 2016–present)
- Håkon Sverre Nakken – bass (1999–2003, 2014, 2016–present) (Benea Reach)
- Michal Bäckrud- drums (1999–2003, 2014, 2016–present)

Former

- Tapani Hoikkaniemi – bass (1994–1998)
- Emil Nikolaisen (Extol, Serena Maneesh) – bass (1998–1999)

Live

- Even Steven (Silver, Evil Eye) – bass (1999)
- Tommy Akerholdt (Silver, Turbonegro) – drums (1999)
- Ole Børud – guitar (2002) (Extol, Schaliach, Arnold B Family, Fleshkiller)

Timeline

== Discography ==
- Selfmindead 7" (Soulscape Records, 1997)
- Selfmindead (Solid State Records, Sally Forth Records, 1998)
- Hit's of the 80's (contributed "Wayfaring Stranger" to this compilation, Sally Forth Records, 2000)
- At the Barricades We Fall (Solid State Records, Sally Forth Records, 2000)
- The Oslo Compact (split with The Spirit That Guides Us, Sally Forth Records, 2001)
