= The Kiss, the Hope =

The Kiss, The Hope

Studio album by Lengsel
- Released: 2006
- Genre: Progressive metal, experimental metal, sludge metal
- Length: 46:33
- Label: Whirlwind

Lengsel chronology
Solace (2000)	The Kiss, The Hope (2006)

The Kiss, The Hope is the second full-length album by Norwegian metal band Lengsel, released on Whirlwind Records in December 2006. The album was a stylistical change on the band's musical direction, representing more of a sludge metal style.

== Recording ==
After the release of Extol's The Blueprint Dives and the following tour, Ole Halvard Sveen, Tor Magne S. Glidje and John Robert Mjåland returned to their Lengsel project six years after Solace and began work for the second album. During 2006, the band set up a Myspace profile where they hinted that they would take a more garage rock and hardcore punk oriented direction while keeping some elements of their black metal roots. Announcing an initial working title of Hell Calls Hell, the band released videos from the studio and sound samples, one of which was accompanied by a short video for "Angels in America" with footage of an old photograph. With a release date set for December 2006, the band announced the official title as The Kiss, The Hope, signed to German-based Whirlwind Records, and shortly after published a trailer for the upcoming music video for "The Pale People" which was released a few months later.

== Sound ==
Musically, the album represents mostly a sludge metal style such as on "Hell Calls Hell" (featuring Ilkka of Benea Reach) and "A Little Less to Heal". "Åndenød – The Easy Kill" consists of industrial noise sounds and "Tales of Lost Love" is jazz-influenced, while "The Pale People" is a gothic rock or post-punk song reminiscent of The Cure with Robert Smith type vocals and echoed, dark guitars.

== Reception ==
According to AllMusic, The Kiss, The Hope was "less positively reviewed" than Solace. However, critics such as Stefan Lang of PowerMetal.de gave it favorable reviews and called the album innovative.

== Track listing ==
1. "An Anonymous Phone-Call and a Dead Line" – 8:03
2. "Hell Calls Hell" – 3:53
3. "Miss S.C." – 3:49
4. "Ådendød – The Easy Kill" – 1:55
5. "Tales of Lost Love" – 5:29
6. "A Little Less to Heal" – 4:51
7. "Eternal Seven" – 2:26
8. "The Warm Water Chaseway" – 3:23
9. "Angels in America" – 3:01
10. "The Pale People" – 6:04
11. "Avec Toi" – 3:31
