= Lengsel =

Norwegian progressive metal band

- Origin: Norway
- Genres: Progressive metal, unblack metal, experimental metal
- Years active: 1994–present
- Labels: Endtime, Solid State, Whirlwind
- Members: Tor Magne Glidje; Ole Halvard Sveen; John Robert Mjåland
- Website: Lengsel on Myspace

Lengsel was a progressive black metal band formed in 1994 in Norway. They released one album, Solace, on Endtime Productions in 2000, which was licensed to Solid State Records for an American release. The second album, The Kiss, the Hope, was released in 2007. Their name means "longing" in Norwegian. Longing for home is a prominent theme on their debut release.

== History ==
The group was formed in 1995. They released a self-titled demo in 1997. Shortly after releasing the debut album Solace in 2000 on three labels, the members took a break from Lengsel. The same line-up formed the band Ganglion, and departed their black metal roots for a rock-oriented style, alienating many old fans and creating a new fan base.

In 1999, guitarist Tor Magne Glidje joined Extol on bass. The following year, Glidje switched to guitar for Extol, and John Mjåland joined on bass. When the guitarist returned, Glidje left Extol, but Mjåland stayed. In 2004, both of Extol's guitarists left the band and were replaced with Glidje and Ole Sveen, merging Ganglion with Extol. Several Ganglion songs were incorporated into the Extol setlist. All three members of Lengsel/Ganglion are current members of Extol. The remaining members of Extol played in Ganglion at one point or another.

In 2006, while Extol was on break, a reformed Lengsel recorded The Kiss, the Hope, and released it on Whirlwind Records. It favors sludge/hardcore over the rock of Ganglion, and has little in common with Solace.

In 2007, the original members of Extol, vocalist Peter Espevoll and drummer David Husvik, ended that band. The three remaining members, Sveen, Glidje and Mjåland, started Mantric.

== Band members ==
- Tor Magne Glidje – guitars, vocals
- Ole Halvard Sveen – drums, acoustic guitars, keyboards, vocals
- John Robert Mjåland – bass

== Discography ==
Studio albums

- Solace (2000)
- The Kiss, the Hope (2006)
- Lengsel (2011)

Other releases

- Lengsel (1997)
