= The Blueprint Dives =

Studio album by Extol
- Released: 29 March 2005
- Recorded: 2004
- Studios: Toproom Studio (Lunner, Norway); Antfarm Studio (Aabyhøj, Denmark)
- Genres: Progressive metal, extreme metal, hard rock
- Length: 49:40
- Label: Solid State
- Producers: Borge Finstad, Extol

Extol chronology
Synergy (2003)	The Blueprint Dives (2005)	Extol (2013)

The Blueprint Dives is the fourth studio album by the Norwegian Christian metal band Extol. Recorded at the end of 2004 at Top Room Studios and produced by Børge Finstad and Extol, Blueprint was released on 29 March 2005 on Solid State Records. The album met with a widely positive reception and received a Spellemannprisen nomination. On this album, Ole Børud and Christer Espevoll left Extol, and the band was joined by the members of the rock band Ganglión, Tor Magne S. Glidje and Ole Halvard Sveen.

== Style ==
The album has a very different style to their previous releases, and its genre is very difficult to categorize: Imperiumi.net described the sound as an amalgamation of Cult of Luna, Muse and Porcupine Tree.Exclaim! described the band as moving past the sometimes overreaching progressive sounds for a more modern and straight-up rock sound. The reviewer further described the album style as "taking the sounds of bands as disparate as Opeth, Norma Jean and the general vibe of cold symphonic black metal, and combining a bit of a simplified, melodic groove to it, creating something new entirely." Both writer Matt Morrow and Cross Rhythms mentioned that there was debate as to whether the album is even metal. The Cross Rhythms reviewer stated that "I personally think they are [metal] but taking much more influence from the prog metal bands - as Fire Fly did on their last album. In fact comparisons with Fire Fly continue further, in terms of longevity and musical evolution - both too have musical creativity and individuality by the bucket load." Len Nash of Indie Vision Music and The Phantom Tollbooth described the sound by stating that "[w]here Synergy was thrash, The Blueprint Dives is more heavy metal, with it being hard rock here or there on a few accounts." Morrow also compared the album to Synergy, saying "[w]here Synergy found the band in technical thrash mode, The Blueprints Dives, very simply put, finds the band playing a style that is much more melodic than their past work. Try mixing a touch of Synergy with influences from the rock band Ganglion." musicOMH found touches of the Deftones in the album. The reviewer went on to call the album "varied, wide in scope and impressively versatile", and stating that "[i]n any genre of music those are rare qualities, but in death metal and its ugly relations, it's almost unheard of." Alternative Press similarly labeled the album as alternative metal in the style of the Deftones. Alex Straka of the German site Powermetal.de labeled the album as progressive thrash metal, and found Devin Townsend influences on "From the Everyday Mountain Top" and Faith No More influences on "Another Adam's Escape". AllMusic found comparisons almost impossible and considered the album something truly original:

... To Extol's greatest credit, offhand comparisons to other bands are almost impossible! There's a glimpse of Swedish prog-deathsters Opeth (who, incidentally, toured with Extol the previous year) in the taught, stop-start riffs of "Soul Deprived" or "Void"; the shadow of a Tool or Deftones in the singer's plaintive delivery over stuttering rhythms on "In Reversal" and "Another Adam's Escape"; and even an ethereal, Pink Floyd or Radiohead-like quality to dreamy numbers "Pearl" and "Lost in Dismay". But when a writer has to reach down to something as obscure as ancient technical thrashers Anacrusis in the search for viable parallels, you're obviously dealing with a truly original sonic experience.

— Eduardo Rivadavia, AllMusic

Jeff Wagner in his book Mean Deviation stated that "[w]ith more melody and flow - and curious leanings toward emo and indie rock - The Blueprint Dives was both eccentric and accessible." Wagner stated that while "the ghost of Believer", one of the band's early influences, was still near, the album straddled "a precarious line" between "tech circa 1993, modern art rock, and blatant emo influence." Citing the album's extended array of guest musicians and instruments including synths, piano, Rhodes organ, and upright bass, Wagner stated that the sound canvas on the album "is exceptionally wide."

== Reception ==
Professional ratings
Review scores
Source	Rating
AllMusic	4.5/5 stars
Alternative Press	2/5 stars
Cross Rhythms	10/10 stars
Imperiumi.net	7+/10
Metal Hammer Germany	6/7
Metal Storm	5/10

Blueprint was nominated for the Norwegian Grammy, Spellemannprisen, and voted one of the Top 5 metal albums of the year by the readers of one of the largest newspapers in Norway, Dagbladet.

Following the release, the band toured with Mastodon, Opeth and God Forbid. A critic from the magazine Drum! praised the drummer David Husvik as being on the same level of talent as Mike Portnoy and Neil Peart. A music video was shot for the "Pearl" single and it was released on various video compilations. The video was directed by Øystein Moe and Alexander Somma of Helmet Productions at an abandoned factory, featuring modern zombie imagery.

== Track listing ==
All tracks are written by Peter Espevoll, Ole Halvard Sveen, Tor Magne Glidje, John Robert Mjåland and David Husvik.

No.	Title	Length
1.	"Gloriana"	3:26
2.	"Soul Deprived"	3:26
3.	"In Reversal"	5:37
4.	"Pearl"	2:55
5.	"From the Everyday Mountain Top"	3:46
6.	"Another Adam's Escape"	4:36
7.	"The Things I Found"	6:24
8.	"Lost in Dismay"	5:14
9.	"Essence"	3:43
10.	"Void"	5:38
11.	"The Death Sedative"	4:55
Total length:		49:40

== Personnel ==
=== Extol ===
- Peter Espevoll – vocals, acoustic guitar
- Tor Magne Glidje – electric & acoustic guitars
- Ole Halvard Sveen – electric & acoustic guitars, vocals
- John Robert Mjåland – bass guitar
- David Husvik – drums

=== Additional personnel ===
- David Wallumrød – electric piano (track 8), piano (track 3, 6)
- Anders Salomon Lidal – synthesizer (track 2, 3, 4, 7, 11)
- Magnus Westgaard – double bass (track 7, 8)
- Borge Finstad – production, engineering
- Tue Madsen – engineering, mixing
