= Mesmerized (Extol album) =

EP by Extol
- Released: November 2, 1999
- Recorded: 1997–1999
- Genre: Christian metal Progressive death metal Black metal Industrial metal
- Length: 34:40
- Label: Endtime Productions; Solid State Records
- Producer: Extol

Extol chronology
Burial (1998)	Mesmerized (1999)	Undeceived (2000)

Mesmerized is an EP by the Norwegian Christian metal band Extol and their second official release. It was released on Endtime Productions and Solid State Records.

== Reception ==
Professional ratings
Review scores
Source	Rating
AllMusic	3/5 stars
Chronicles of Chaos	7.5/10

Steve Huey of AllMusic rated the EP three stars out of five, considering the release similar to the band's debut album and essentially a package for devoted fans. The Orlando Sentinel disliked the techno remixes on the EP but appreciated the rest of the music and considered the release all-together a "decent disc". Alex Cantwell of Chronicles of Chaos rate the EP 7.5 out of 10. The only reason for not rating higher was due to the industrial tracks, which they considered filler that took up space which could have been used for new Extol music. Nevertheless, they viewed the recording as essential for fans of the band and highly recommended for others.

== Track listing ==
All songs written by Extol.

1. "Enthralled" - 3:58
2. "The Prodigal Son" - 6:05
3. "Storms of Disillusion" - 5:12
4. "Burial (Sanctum remix)" - 8:31
5. "Renhetens Elv (Sanctum remix)" - 4:24
6. "Work of Art (Raison d'Etre remix)" - 6:30
- Tracks 4 to 6 are all industrial remixes of tracks from the Burial album.

== Personnel ==
Extol

- Peter Espevoll - lead vocals
- Ole Børud - guitar, vocals
- Christer Espevoll - guitar
- Eystein Holm - bass guitar
- David Husvik - drums, backing vocals
