= David Husvik =

Norwegian drummer

- Also known as: Dache
- Born: David Schwarz Husvik; 12 December 1977 (age 48)
- Origin: Oslo, Norway
- Genres: Christian metal; heavy metal; thrash metal; death metal; progressive death metal; technical death metal; black metal; gothic metal; metalcore; hardcore punk; viking metal; extreme metal; progressive metal; darkwave
- Occupation: Drummer
- Years active: 1993–present

David Husvik is a Norwegian drummer who has played in the metal bands Extol, Absurd², Twisted into Form and InSection and Aperture, a jazz and acoustic rock project. Husvik helped to start Pirates N 'Thieves in 2007. He also performed in a side project of Extol called Ganglion.

== Biography ==
Husvik began his musical career with Extol. The band has been highly influential to bands all around. The band has been Husvik's main musical career before the band disbanded in 2007, where Husvik took a musical break alongside his cousin Peter Espevoll, while the remaining three members, went on to form Mantric. Evidently, Husvik was a part of the first lineup of Mantric, but later left. During his time in Extol, Husvik also performed with Absurd² and The Crest. The band, Absurd², consisted of Husvik, former Extol guitarist and cousin Christer Espevoll, Magnus Westgaard of fellow Norwegian band Vardøger, and Ivar Nikolaisem of Silver. While, The Crest, Husvik was in from 1996, until 2001. In 2011 he produced an album for the Norwegian hardcore band Shevils. Extol reunited in 2013, with Husvik and Peter being the two original members, alongside Ole Børud. In 2013, Husvik was present at Elements of Rock Festival in 2013, though Extol was not present. Though Extol was not present, Husvik was there as a roadie for Jayson Sherlock, formerly of Mortification. Husvik and Børud were the final remaining members of Extol in 2013, as Espevoll decided to depart, which led Husvik to form Azusa with former Guitarist and his cousin Christer, while Børud formed Fleshkiller. In 2018, Extol returned from their hiatus, with Husvik and the Espevoll brothers. Shortly thereafter, Azusa released their first single "Interstellar Islands", signed to Extol's former label, Solid State Records, and announced their lineup of Husvik, Christer, Liam Wilson (ex-The Dillinger Escape Plan, ex-Frodus, John Frum) and Eleni Zafiriadou (Sea + Air). In 2020, it was announced that Husvik would perform drums on former Tourniquet guitarist Gary Lenaire's solo album, which would also feature Guy Ritter, Luke Easter, and Erik Mendez, who all performed in the early days of Tourniquet. The band was later announced by Michael Sweet of Stryper as FLOOD, consisting of Husvik, Lenaire, Ritter, Mendez, and Anna Sentina.

== Bands ==
Current

- Extol (1993–2007, 2012–present)
- Azusa (2014–present)
- FLOOD (2020–present)
- Aperture
- InSection

Live

- Mantric (2007–2009 [Official]; 2011-present)

Former

- Absurd² (1999–2004)
- The Crest (1996–2001)
- Doctor Midnight & The Mercy Cult (2009–2011)
- Ganglion
- Twisted into Form (2000–2012)

== Discography ==
Extol

Studio albums

- 1998: Burial
- 2000: Undeceived
- 2003: Synergy
- 2005: The Blueprint Dives
- 2013: Extol

EPs

- 1999: Mesmerized
- 2001: Paralysis

Compilations

- 1996: Northern Lights / Norwegian Metal Compilation (Rowe Productions 012)

Videos

- 2015: Of Light and Shade

Absurd²

- 2004: Absurd² EP

The Crest

- 1999: Childhood's End / Thorn
- 1999: Thunderfuel
- 2000: Dark Rock Armada

Twisted into Form

- 2000: Then Comes Affliction to Awaken the Dreamer

Ganglion

- 2002: Ganglion (7")
- 2003: Stripped

Aperture

- 2006: Salvage

Doctor Midnight & the Mercy Cult

- 2011: I Declare: Treason
- 2011: "(Don't) Waste It"

Azusa

- 2018: Heavy Yoke
- 2020: Loop of Yesterdays
