= Whitefrozen =

EP by Vardøger
- Released: January 1, 2003
- Genres: Unblack metal, Viking metal, folk metal
- Length: 19:04
- Label: Endtime

Vardøger chronology
Whitefrozen (2003)	Ghost Notes (2015)

Whitefrozen is the 2003 debut EP by the Norwegian unblack and Viking metal band Vardøger. Vardøger formed in 1994, under the name Hidden Paradise, as a side project of its constituent musicians.

== Recording and release ==
Songs were recorded in 1995 through 1997, including a 24-minute track that has never been released, but due to the band members' other commitments, Vardøger did not manage to release any music at that time and the group disbanded. However, "Footprints of Thunder" was subsequently released on the compilation album In the Shadow of Death: A Scandinavian Extreme Music Compilation in 2000. That song was covered in 2019 by Irgalom on their Meditate I album. Vardøger reformed in order to release more music, resulting in an EP in 2003 through Endtime Productions.

== Style ==
On this release, the style performed by Vardøger was described as unblack metal, black metal mixed with folk music, black and folk metal, atmospheric black metal, and Viking metal. The song "Footprints of Thunder" was described as symphonic black metal. Johannes Jonsson described the songs on the EP as "slow black metal" and "slow majestic Viking Metal." Stefan Lang of Powermetal.de compared the sound of the titular song "Whitefrozen" to the output of Amorphis. Overall, he found the sound of the band to be similar to Schaliach, due to the presence of Dalbakk in both bands, except that Vardøger demonstrated a more black metal sound and was absent the contribution of Schaliach's other member, Ole Børud. Music writer Matt Morrow described Whitefrozen as the place where "driving aggression frolics in the fields with haunting melodies. Where bells, chanting, ivory, and the marching of drums are welcome friends." John Jackson of The Metal Resource compared the black metal side of the band to Antestor and the folk metal aspects to Pospolite Ruszenie.

== Reception ==
Professional ratings
Review scores
Source	Rating
Imperiumi	9-/10+
Johannes Jonsson	3/5 stars
Matt Morrow	10/10 stars

The EP was well-received, with Ultimate Guitar describing it as a "classic." Stefan Lang of Powermetal.de was favorable to the album, stating that there was no question that the band had the potential to crawl above the average. Pekka Ryhänen of Imperiumi gave the album a 9- out of 10+, considering the songs imaginative and well-composed, the music easily played and relaxed while subtly detailed, and the lyrics epic and going well with the music. HM writer Matt Morrow gave the album a full ten-out-of-ten, expressing his delight that the band had released more material after their compilation appearance. Writer Johannes Jonsson rated the album three-out-of-five, calling the EP "a really nice cd for everyone into slow black metal." He praised the vocals of Peter Dalbakk, which he considered better in this project than in Dalbakk's other band, Schaliach. Jonsson said that he could not get into the tracks "Desert Pale" and "Inferno", but that the other three songs on the EP were excellent. In a brief and retrospective review, Jakob Plantinga of Rocklife.nl said that while Whitefrozen was not a bad record, it was not particularly innovative.

== Track listing ==
No.	Title	Length
1.	"Desert Pale"	3:44
2.	"Footprints of Thunder"	3:11
3.	"Inferno"	3:16
4.	"Whitefrozen"	4:16
5.	"Silent Witness"	4:37
Total length:		19:04

== Personnel ==
- Alexander Dalbakk – guitars
- Knut Anders Sørum – keyboards
- Magnus Westgaard – bass
- Stian Aarebrot – guitars, vocals
- Robert Bordevik – guitars, vocals
- Peter Dalbakk – vocals
- Tom Arne Fossheim – drums
