= Extol (album) =

Studio album by Extol
- Released: 21 June 2013
- Genre: Christian metal, progressive death metal
- Length: 46:24
- Label: Indie, Facedown
- Producer: Extol

Extol chronology
The Blueprint Dives (2005)	Extol (2013)

Singles from Extol
- 1. "Open the Gates" Released: 22 April 2013; 2. "Wastelands" Released: 29 November 2013

Extol is the fifth full-length studio album by the Norwegian Christian progressive death metal band Extol, released in 2013. It was described by music critics as a mixture of death and progressive metal, with some melodic elements. Reviews of the album were very positive, and the album managed to chart on the Billboard Top Christian Albums chart.

== Background and release ==
In 2007 Extol went on hiatus after releasing its 2005 fourth album, The Blueprint Dives, then reformed as a trio in 2012 and announced that it had begun work on a new studio album. Consisting of prior Extol members David Husvik, Peter Espevoll, and Ole Børud, the band released a teaser video for the album on 29 May 2013. On 22 April 2013 the band released a single, "Open the Gates", for streaming on YouTube, followed by a music video for "A Gift Beyond Human Reach" on 12 June 2013. According to Husvik, "Extol was the album that was planned all the way, but never materialized. Partly due to changes in the line up, but also because of the band’s urge to always reach for something new. The album is the recap of 20 years of Extol-history, both musically and lyrically." Indie Recordings released the album on 21 June 2013 in Norway, Germany, and Austria, then on 24 June worldwide, and Facedown Records released the album for North America on 25 June 2013. The album peaked at No. 23 on the Billboard Top Christian Albums chart.

== Style and influences ==
The basic style of the album was described by critics as a mixture death and progressive metal, with some melodic elements. Mark Fisher of Metal Forces wrote that "The first is that Extol have gone even further into the progressive aspect of their music than their last two albums did. The band full-on channel aspects of Rush, Yes and King's X without apology." Vocally, the band ranges from death growls to progressive, pop-style clean singing to black metal rasps and wails. Emma Johnston of Metal Hammer said that Extol takes a "distinctly kitchen-sink approach to their art, mashing together frontman Peter Espevoll's death-metal rasp with dreamy prog melodies and a relentless thrash march from the get-go." On the song "Ministers", Johnston states that Extol "turns Slayer inside out and uses their [Slayer's] riffs for their own pious means." Anthony Peronto of Christian Music Zine compared the clean vocals to Queen, and John Magelssen of Indie Vision Music specified that the singing on "Open the Gates" sounds like "Weird Al mixed with The Faceless' vocals." Magelssen described the technical style of the album as "intricate syncopated (off rhythm) beats and ever changing time signatures," and Timothy Estabrooks of Jesus Freak Hideout said that on Extol the "riffs are lightning fast and complex, the drumming is aggressive and constantly changing tempos and rhythms, and even the occasional breakdown is very well executed." In addition to the progressive death metal framework of the album, Extol works other genres into the album. Magelssen stated that the syncopated drumming on "Betrayal" leads into a thrash metal feel, and described "A Gift Beyond Human Reach" as incorporating industrial music into the intro, specifically through hammer-on-iron and similar sounds. "Faltering Moves" Magelssen characterized as a power ballad. Florian Schörg of Metal.de called the album's style as death and thrash mixed with progressive song structures and a modern djent sound. He noted that while he did find comparisons to Meshuggah and the djent music trend, Extol's varied influence keeps it from being forced into any drawers. Jakob Emhke of Powermetal.de described the song arrangements as reminiscent of Devin Townsend, but also noted similarities to Leprous, especially due to Extol's use of clean vocals. Mario of Metal 4 compared the band to Opeth, mentioning in particular the similarity between the song "Betrayal" and Opeth's album Blackwater Park.

== Critical reception ==
Professional ratings
Review scores
Source	Rating
HM	4.5/5 stars
Indie Vision Music	4/5 stars
Jesus Freak Hideout	4.5/5 stars
Metal.de	9/10
Metal Forces	9/10
Metal Storm	8/10
Metal Hammer	6/10
Metal Hammer Germany	6/7
Outburn	8/10
Powermetal.de	8.50/10

Extol generally received high praise from critics, who championed the album as marking the return of a classic band. Petra Schurer of Metal Hammer Germany rated the album six out of seven, lauding the band for combining brilliant solos and forceful vocals with a sense of groove, a style which only a few bands pursue. He praised the band for creating songs which build slowly, not only through instrumentation but through the band's vocals. Rob Houston of HM rated the album four-point five stars out of five, calling it "a long overdue masterpiece" that is "next to flawless, with some of the most amazing song structures you will hear this year."

Jesus Freak Hideout gave the album two reviews, each of which gave the album four-point-five out of five stars. Timothy Estabrooks said that Extol "is a very worthy comeback album. It may not quite reach the heights achieved by Undeceived, but it is a worthy competitor and perhaps tops any of their other releases." Michael Weaver described the band as fashioning "one of their best albums to date..." John Magelssen of Indie Vision Music rated the album four out of five, writing that "Evolving with each CD, this band has really shown how truly impressive they are with this self-titled album." He went on to say that "...this album is far from generic and will keep you pleasantly surprised in each song." Jakob Ehmke of Powermetal.de scored the album at eight-point-five out of ten, stating that the album's complexity draws the listener deeper in with each listen. Florian Schörg of Metal.de gave the album a nine out of ten, praising the technical skill of the band, its varied influence, and its production by Jens Bogren. At Outburn, Dan Slessor rated the album an 8 out of ten, affirming that "This really is the sound of a band reinvigorated and playing as if their lives depended on it." R'Vannith of Metal Storm rated the album eight out of ten.

But a few critics took a more-mixed view of the album. Emma Johnston from the English language version of Metal Hammer rated the album six out of ten, pointing out that "there's little here to have progressive scene-leaders like Opeth looking over their shoulders." She elaborated that apart from the string-drenched interlude on "Dawn of Redemption", "Extol hardly shifts out of a single gear, but it's worth a listen for those who like their genres bobbing around in a big old melting pot." Anthony Peronto of Christian Music Zine rated it at three-point-seventy-five out of five, summarizing that while metal pioneer comebacks are not entirely new, this one did not entirely click with him. He concluded that "The music itself was excellence in and of itself but perhaps it was the odd mix of vocals that let me down. I guarantee after a few listens even a doubter like me will warm up to return of Extol and the album they've always intended to create." Mario of Metal 4 rated the album six out of ten, stating the while the album is decent, it also is fairly predictable.

== Track listing ==
All music is composed by David Husvik and Ole Børud, except where noted

No.	Title	Lyrics	Music	Length
1.	"Betrayal"	Peter Espevoll		4:20
2.	"Open the Gates"	Husvik, Børud, Espevoll		4:28
3.	"Wastelands"	Espevoll		4:59
4.	"A Gift Beyond Human Reach"	Espevoll	Børud	4:06
5.	"Faltering Moves"	Husvik, Espevoll		5:57
6.	"Behold the Sun"	Husvik, Espevoll		4:15
7.	"Dawn of Redemption" (Instrumental)		Husvik	4:18
8.	"Ministers"	Husvik, Espevoll		4:19
9.	"Extol"	Espevoll		4:03
10.	"Unveiling the Obscure"	Husvik, Espevoll		5:39
Total length:				46:24

Deluxe edition
No.	Title	Lyrics	Length
11.	"Sting of Death"	Espevoll	4:12
Total length:			50:36

== Personnel ==
Extol

- Peter Espevoll – unclean vocals, production
- Ole Børud – guitars, bass, clean vocals, mellotron, production
- David Husvik – drums, cymbal, vocals, production

Additional personnel

- Martin Ludvig Engen Rosenhoff – cello (track 7, 9)
- Travis Smith – art direction, illustration, layout
- Jens Bogren – mixing, mastering
- Kenneth Jensen – band photography
- Øystein Tengesdal – additional recording assistant

== Chart history ==
Chart (2013)	Peak position
US Top Heatseekers	22
US Top Christian Albums	23
