= Synergy (Extol album) =

Studio album by Extol
- Released: 12 August 2003
- Recorded: 2003
- Genre: Progressive metal, thrash metal, death metal
- Length: 42:44
- Label: Century Media (International); Solid State (USA)
- Producer: Borge Finstand; Extol

Extol chronology
| Undeceived (2000) | Synergy (2003) | The Blueprint Dives (2005) |

Synergy is the third studio album by Norwegian Christian extreme metal band Extol. It was released in 2003 on Century Media, but was licensed to Solid State Records.

The Norwegian singer-songwriter Maria Solheim performs guest vocals on "Paradigms". The session guitarist Tore Moren plays guitar solo on "Nihilism 2002" and the first solo on "Psychopath". Samuel Durling of the death industrial band Mental Destruction performs distorted vocals on "Emancipation".

The album was recorded at Top Room Studios. It was produced by Børge Finstad and was mixed at Fagerborg Studios and Top Room Studios. Morten Lund mastered the album at Masterhuset AS. The album cover was painted by Hugh Syme, who has done work for such groups as Iron Maiden, Megadeth, Rush and Fates Warning. The band says that the cover picture "illustrates the synergy effect of elements working together (monk and Death) and thus gaining strength beyond what the effect would be if all the elements would be working separately."

== Reception ==
Professional ratings
Review scores
| Source | Rating |
|---|---|
| Blabbermouth.net | 8/10 |
| Exclaim! | Highly favorable |
| Metal.de | 8/10 |
| Metal Hammer Germany | 5/7 |
| Powermetal.de | Highly favorable |
| The Whipping Post | 9/10 |

Stephanie Sollow of Progressive World gave the album a very positive review, writing: "Extol are very good at what they do, playing a very tight and intricately arranged form of progressive thrash metal, if you will. They transition easily between different meters, all while creating a heavy wall of sound though which a guitar lead or some dynamic cymbal work will poke through for its lead spot."

== Track listing ==
All lyrics are written by Christer Espevoll, except where noted.

Synergy track listing
| No. | Title | Lyrics | Music | Length |
|---|---|---|---|---|
| 1. | "Grace for Succession" | | C. Espevoll, David Husvik, Ole Børud | 4:12 |
| 2. | "Paradigms" | | C. Espevoll, Husvik, Børud, John Robert Mjåland | 3:40 |
| 3. | "Psychopath" | | Børud | 3:47 |
| 4. | "Blood Red Cover" | Peter Espevoll | C. Espevoll, Husvik, Børud | 3:37 |
| 5. | "26 Miles from Marathon" | Mjåland | C. Espevoll, Husvik, Børud | 4:12 |
| 6. | "Confession of Inadequacy" | | C. Espevoll, Børud | 3:47 |
| 7. | "Scrape the Surface" | | C. Espevoll, Husvik, Børud, Mjåland | 3:20 |
| 8. | "Thrash Synergy" | | Husvik, Børud, P. Espevoll | 5:20 |
| 9. | "Aperture" | P. Espevoll | P. Espevoll | 3:11 |
| 10. | "Emancipation" | Mjåland | C. Espevoll, Børud | 3:20 |
| 11. | "Nihilism 2002" | | Husvik, Børud | 4:09 |
| Total length: | | | | 42:44 |

== Personnel ==
Extol

- Peter Espevoll – vocals, acoustic guitar
- Ole Børud – guitars, clean vocals
- Christer Espevoll – guitars
- John Robert Mjåland – bass
- David Husvik – drums, backing vocals

Additional personnel

- Maria Solheim – vocals (track 2)
- Samuel Durling – vocals (track 10)
- Tore Moren – guitar solos (track 3, 11)
