= Fleshkiller =

- Origin: Norway
- Genres: Progressive metal • extreme metal • Christian metal
- Years active: 2015–present
- Label: Facedown • Indie
- Spinoff of: Schaliach
- Members: Ole Børud; Elisha Mullins; Ole Vistnes; Andreas Skorpe Sjøen
- Past members: Peter Dalbakk
- Website: Fleshkiller on Facebook

Fleshkiller is a progressive metal band from Norway, founded in 2015 by Ole Børud and Peter Dalbakk.

== History ==
Fleshkiller started in 2015 in Norway as a side project of Ole Børud of the progressive death metal band Extol and Peter Dalbakk of the band Vardøger. Børud and Dalbakk were former bandmates of the band Schaliach, a death-doom band they formed together. The two hired drummer Andreas Skorpe Sjøen from the band Umpfel, and Ole Vistnes, of the bands Shining and Tristania, as the band's bass player.

Dalbakk later quit the band, wanting to spend more time with his family. The band replaced him with Elisha Mullins, vocalist of The Burial and former guitarist of A Hill to Die Upon. Børud had come in contact with Mullins through both of their time on the Facedown Records roster. The band later signed to Indie Recordings in Europe and Facedown Records in North America to release their debut album Awaken.

On June 30, 2017, the band released their debut single, "Parallel Kingdom". The band released their second single "Warfare" on August 18, 2017, via a music video. On September 1, 2017, the band released "Salt of the Earth", their third and final single before the album released on September 15. The album came out on September 15, 2017, which received positive critical reception.

== Musical style and influences ==
Much like Extol, Fleshkiller draws influences from several different bands, including Death, Steely Dan, Yes, and Necrophagist. The band remains close lyrically to what Extol had promoted through the Christian metal genre. The band has been compared to Devin Townsend, Textures, Animals As Leaders, and " Yes meets My Chemical Romance meets Napalm Death." The genre of the band is described as progressive metal and progressive and technical death metal, incorporating elements of black metal, thrash metal, death metal, Gothenburg metal, and metalcore.

== Members ==
Current members

- Ole Børud – guitars, vocals (2015–present) (Extol, Schaliach, Arnold B. Family, Selfmindead)
- Elisha Mullins – guitars, vocals (2017–present) (Miss May I, The Burial, ex-A Hill to Die Upon, War of Ages, ex-Maugrim)
- Ole Vistnes – bass (2016–present) (Shining, Tristania, Extol)
- Andreas Skorpe Sjøen – drums (2016–present) (Umpfel)

Former members

- Peter Dalbakk – vocals (2015–2017) (Schaliach, Vardøger)

== Discography ==
Studio albums

- Awaken (Facedown Records/Indie Recordings; September 15, 2017)

Singles

- "Parallel Kingdom" (June 30, 2017)
- "Warfare" (August 18, 2017)
- "Salt of the Earth" (September 1, 2017)
