= Sonrise =

Studio album by Schaliach
- Released: 1995
- Recorded: 1995
- Studio: Studio 19, Hamar, Norway; Ideal Mastering, London, UK
- Genre: Christian metal; progressive metal; extreme metal; Gothic metal
- Length: 45:27
- Label: Petroleum
- Producer: Schaliach; Fred Dalbakk

Alternative cover
- Cover art for the 2005 re-issue

Sonrise is the debut studio album from the Norwegian Christian metal band Schaliach. It was released in 1996 through Petroleum Records to a mostly positive critical reception. In particular, the guitar work from Ole Børud was praised. In 2005, Momentum Scandinavia re-issued the album with an additional track - "Purple Filter", that originally appeared on a compilation album.

== Style and lyrics ==
The style performed by Schaliach was variously described as doom metal, death metal, melodic death metal, death-doom, Gothic metal, black metal, and progressive metal. Likened to a "metal symphony", the music is strongly influenced by classical music and was compared to that of Metallica as well as Dream Theater, Threshold, Shadow Gallery, and Teramaze. The instrumental track "Coming of the Dawn" is accompanied by piano and string instruments. The overall sound of the album was described as similar to Amorphis.

The lyrics on the album are explicitly Christian, drawing heavily from the Bible and referencing Christ and the love of God for all of humanity. "You Maintain" is written from the perspective of God pleading with an unbeliever, and "A Father's Morning" from the perspective of God speaking to a wayward Christian. Though an instrumental, "In Memoriam" is dedicated to unborn children who were aborted.

== Critical reception ==
Professional ratings
Review scores
Source	Rating
Matt Morrow	90/100
The Phantom Tollbooth	4.5/5 stars 4/5 stars
Rock Hard	4/10

Sonrise was received very well by most critics. Alex Cantwell from Chronicles of Chaos described the record as "excellent doom with a distinct Norwegian flavour." HM writer Matt Morrow in their review of the 2005 re-issue rated the album 90/100 and called the album a "classic". They expressed the opinion that while Sonrise "may not have been the best the genre has ever seen, but the emotion that a band with a brutally heavy sound and growled vocals could convey was quite impressive." Josh Spencer from The Phantom Tollbooth rated that album four-and-a-half out of five, calling the duo "astounding!" While they felt that the production value and overall sound was not at the same level as Amorphis's Tales From the Thousand Lakes, it was great enough for them. Shari Lloyd, also of The Phantom Tollbooth, said that they were not disappointed, and they gave the album a four out of five. Lloyd stated that though growled vocals are not usually their style, on Sonrise they did not mind them since the music was the main focus. Rock Hard was far less favorable to the album, rating it 4/10. They considered Schaliach boring and that the sound on the album was muffled and mashed together.

Yngve Litleskare Leine of the Christian youth magazine Itro noted that the instrumental track "Coming of the Dawn" was described by a reviewer as "praise without words". Metal Injection opined that the angel statue depicted on the 2005 re-release is a metaphor for how the band carved "a tribute to the divine" out of mostly hard and heavy music.

== Track listing ==
No.	Title	Lyrics	Music	Length
1.	"The Last Creed"	R. Joseph	O. Børud	6:43
2.	"You Maintain"	O. Børud	O. Børud	7:50
3.	"In Memoriam"		O. Børud	2:23
4.	"A Father's Mourning"	O. Børud	O. Børud, P. Dalbakk	9:25
5.	"A Whisper from Heaven"		O. Børud, P. Dalbakk	4:53
6.	"On a Different Day"	O. Børud, P. Dalbakk	O. Børud	5:42
7.	"Coming of the Dawn"		O. Børud	3:08
8.	"Sonrise"	O. Børud	O. Børud	5:23
Total length:				45:27

2005 re-issue
No.	Title	Lyrics	Music	Length
9.	"Purple Filter" (bonus track)	O. Børud	O. Børud	4:50
Total length:				50:17

== Personnel ==
- Peter Dalbakk - vocals, rhythm guitar on "A Whisper from Heaven" and "Coming of the Dawn"
- Ole Børud - guitar, bass, drums, additional vocals

=== Additional personnel ===
- Øyvind Å. Berg - piano, strings
- Schaliach - production
- Fred Dalbakk - co-production
- Jeff - mastering
