= Burial (Extol album) =

Studio album by Extol
- Released: 22 December 1998
- Recorded: 1997–1998
- Genre: Progressive death metal, Christian metal, black metal
- Length: 62:08
- Label: Endtime Productions; Avalon Records; Solid State Records
- Producer: Extol

Extol chronology
Embraced (demo) (1997)	Burial (1998)	Mesmerized (1999)

Burial is the first album by the Norwegian Christian metal band Extol. It was released on Endtime Productions and then Solid State Records the following year. According to Allmusic, Burial was "a breath of fresh air among a genre that relies on satanic gimmicks", and marked a renewal in the Christian metal scene. In 2010, HM magazine ranked it No. 13 on the Top 100 Christian metal albums of all-time list.

== Recording ==
Burial was recorded at Børud Lydskredderi, Norway, mastered at The Mastering Room, and released on 22 December 1998. Burial was the first release by the Swedish record label Endtime Productions.

Critics and fans usually categorize the album's style as either death/black metal or simply metal because it contains elements of several subgenres of heavy metal music. The notable black metal elements on the album include the high-pitched shrieking vocals of Peter Espevoll, some black metal tremolo riffs, such as on "Innbydelse", and the slightly raw sound production. However, the album's overall atmosphere is not particularly dark or cold; on several songs the soundscape contains happy sounding elements such as the cheerful power metal vocals of the guitarist Ole Børud, creating tensions between the darker elements.

The musical output of Burial is a combination of power metal, old school death metal and traditional heavy metal, and the latter style is especially apparent on the main riff of "Renhetens Elv". Additionally, the songs contain interludes that include elements of industrial music, such as on the song "Justified", jazz and classical music, such as on the song "Tears of Bitterness". The guest musician Maria Riddervold played violin on the songs "Embraced" and "Tears of Bitterness". The musicianship on Burial is virtuoisic, taking the style a step towards technical death metal and progressive metal, technically exceptionally precise, and contains experimental, bizarre song structures. One critic wrote that the album's style "varies from extremely aggressive discharges to beautiful guitar harmonies, while the main focus relies on twisted riffs and ferocious directions." While most of the tracks are in English, three songs are written in Norwegian; "Renhetens Elv" ("The River of Purity"), "Innbydelse" ("Invitation"), and "Jesus kom til jorden for å dø" ("Jesus Came to World to Die").The last, a hymn-like, doom metal-esque and folkish piece, is a cover of a 1976 song by Arnold Børud, who arranged this version of the song and played the organ.

== Reception ==
Professional ratings
Review scores
Source	Rating
Allmusic	4/5 stars
Cross Rhythms	10/10 stars
The Phantom TollBooth	3.5/5 stars
RoughEdge.com	3.5/4

During the time Burial was released, Extol was described as Norway's second best band by the Norwegian magazine Scream. The album was considered by Mike DaRonco of AllMusic to be a breath of fresh air in the death and black metal genres that had run stale for years. Glenn Harper of The Phantom Tollbooth was critical of the album's production quality and some of the poor grammar in the English-language songs, but considered the album "one of the most refreshingly original Christian metal albums I've ever heard." Mike SOS from RoughEdge.com rated the album three-and-a-half out of four, writing that "if you haven't ever heard them I invite you to give them a shot, I think you will be impressed."

== Track listing ==
All tracks are written by Extol, except where noted.

No.	Title	Length
1.	"Into Another Dimension" (instrumental)	1:28
2.	"Celestial Completion"	6:14
3.	"Burial"	4:49
4.	"Renhetens elv"	6:24
5.	"Superior"	5:08
6.	"Reflections of a Broken Soul"	7:28
7.	"Justified"	5:22
8.	"Embraced"	3:41
9.	"Innbydelse"	4:58
10.	"Tears of Bitterness"	7:27
11.	"Work of Art"	5:19
12.	"Jesus kom til jorden for å dø" (Arnold Børud & Mini-Tvers cover)	3:47
Total length:		62:08

Japanese edition
No.	Title	Length
13.	"The Prodigal Son"	6:05
Total length:		68:13

== Personnel ==
Extol

- Peter Espevoll – vocals
- Ole Børud – guitar, vocals
- Christer Espevoll – guitar
- Eystein Holm – bass guitar
- David Husvik – drums, backing vocals

Additional musicians

- Arnold Børud – keyboards
- Maria Riddervold – violins on "Embraced" and "Tears of Bitterness"
