= Solace (Lengsel album) =

Studio album by Lengsel
- Released: 2000
- Genres: Progressive metal Unblack metal
- Length: 43:25
- Labels: Endtime; Solid State; Black Sun
- Producer: Samuel Durlig

Lengsel chronology
Lengsel (1997)	Solace (2000)	The Kiss, The Hope (2006)

Solace is the first full-length album by the Norwegian metal band Lengsel. Solace initially was released on Endtime Productions as a digipak edition in 2000. Around this time the vocalist and guitarist was also a bass player for fellow Norwegian band Extol, who had at the time become an immensely popular band on the American label Tooth and Nail Records' imprint Solid State Records. Label owner Brandon Ebel licensed Solace for Solid State, marketing it with stickers on the album cover stating that it includes members of Extol. The album was also licensed for the German label Black Sun Records.

== Sound and themes ==
Sonically, the album emphasizes on the melodic Scandinavian school of black metal, but with a more progressive edge. The vocals are not typical for black metal, taking a more mid-range rasp rather than guttural shrieks or growls, balancing it with occasional clean vocals. The band makes frequent use of odd time signatures and incorporates sampling and non-metal instrumentation such as keyboards and piano. The lyrics deal with themes of longing, depression, and poetic ponderings on spiritual struggles.

== Reception ==
Professional ratings
Review scores
Source	Rating
The Phantom Tollbooth	4/5 stars
HM Magazine	

According to Allmusic, the album was "critically acclaimed".

== Track listing ==
1. "Solace" - 1:04
2. "Revival" - 6:15
3. "Opaque" - 4:16
4. "Hours" - 7:05
5. "Coat of Arms" - 5:58
6. "Stille Dualisme" - 5:47
7. "The World Monotone" - 6:20
8. "Avmakt" - 6:34

== Production credits ==
- Recorded at Endless Studios by Lengsel.
- Executive producer: Samuel Durlig.
- Produced by Lengsel.
- Engineered by Tore Ylwisaker.
- Mixed at Fagerborg Studio by Børge Finstad, Tore Ylwisaker and Lengsel, track #4 mixed at Endless.
- Art direction by Durling, cover painting by Marie Sveen Sthaal, photos by Wreland.
- All keyboards and acoustic guitars recorded by Ole Halvard Sveen.
