= Lights and Perfections =

Studio album by The Burial
- Released: March 27, 2012
- Genre: Christian metal, metalcore, technical deathcore, progressive metal
- Length: 40:30
- Label: Facedown
- Producer: Josh Schroeder

The Burial chronology
The Winepress (2010)	Lights and Perfections (2012)	In the Taking of Flesh (2013)

Lights and Perfections is the second studio album from The Burial. Facedown Records released the album on March 27, 2012. The Burial worked with Josh Schroeder, in the production of this album.

== Critical reception ==
Professional ratings
Review scores
Source	Rating
HM Magazine	4/5 stars
Indie Vision Music	4/5 stars
Jesus Freak Hideout	4.5/5 stars
Me Gusta Reviews	4/5 stars
The New Review	3.5/5 stars

Awarding the album four stars from HM, Charlie Steffens states, "Crushing. Edifying. A great album." Giving the album four and a half stars at Jesus Freak Hideout, Scott Fryberger writes, "The Burial's latest album is an excellent display of hardcore done right." Brody Barbour, indicating in a four star review by Indie Vision Music, describes, "While Lights and Perfections is not a perfect record it is a thoroughly enjoyable progressive metal record that is easier to listen to than most other counterparts." Awarding the album three and a half stars at The New Review, Jonathan Anderson says, "I fear the replayability of Lights and Perfections is in jeopardy."

== Track listing ==
No.	Title	Length
1.	"Lights"	4:21
2.	"Apathy and Petition"	3:51
3.	"Pearls: The Frailty of Matter"	3:37
4.	"Salt and Wrath"	5:16
5.	"Seed"	4:56
6.	"Wisdom: The Gateway of Liberty"	4:56
7.	"Sight and Sensation"	4:14
8.	"Shackles and Embers"	4:10
9.	"Perfections"	5:09
Total length:		40:30

== Personnel ==
The Burial

- Elisha Mullins - Vocals, Guitars
- Todd Hatfield - Guitars
- Jake Neece - Bass
- Kaleb Luebchow - Drums

Production

- Josh Schroeder - Recording, Mixing, Mastering, Producer, Photographer
- Dave Quiggle - Artwork, Layout
