= Azusa (band) =

American metal band

- Origin: Oslo, Norway; Drama, Greece; Philadelphia, US
- Genres: Progressive metal, extreme metal
- Years active: 2014–present
- Labels: Solid State, Indie
- Members: Eleni Zafiriadou; Christer Espevoll; Liam Wilson; David Husvik
- Website: Azusa on Facebook

Azusa is a progressive extreme metal supergroup that originated in 2018 as a project between cousins and former Extol members, Christer Espevoll and David Husvik. The two had been demoing material, when then The Dillinger Escape Plan bassist Liam Wilson expressed admiration for Extol. The three added on pop vocalist Eleni Zafiriadou of Sea + Air, and the band recorded their debut album, Heavy Yoke. The band is currently signed with Solid State Records.

== History ==
Azusa began between cousins Christer Espevoll and David Husvik, who had originally formed the progressive metal band Extol, who reached great acclaim in their run. The band began to form when the two met up at a show for Espevoll's former band, Benea Reach in 2014. The two began demoing material and put out a contest to begin creating logos for the band. Shortly after the band began working on material, Liam Wilson (ex-The Dillinger Escape Plan, ex-Starkweather, John Frum), proclaimed an admiration for Extol to the two. Husvik and Espevoll hired Wilson into the band and the three began to record the music for Azusa's debut album. The band would then hire on Eleni Zafiriadou of Sea + Air. Husvik had previously seen Zafiriadou perform with a project called Jumbo Jet, which featured clean and unclean vocals from time to time. The band recorded and released several singles over time. Following the singles releases, the band debut their album, Heavy Yoke, with the assistance of Solid State Records in the United States and Indie Recordings in Europe. The band was nominated for an Edvardprisen award on June 20, 2019, most specifically for Espevoll and Husvik. The band announced their first tour with The Contortionist in mid-2019.

In 2020, the band began releasing singles from their next album, titled Loops of Yesterday, which is set to be released on April 10, 2020. The band debuted with their first single, titled "Memories of an Old Emotion". which On February 8, 2020, the band released "Monument", which was the second single for the album. The band's third single, "Detach", was released on February 27, and featured a guitar solo by Alex Skolnick of Testament.

== Style and lyrics ==
The band have been compared to Extol and Cynic, while also throwing comparisons of Death mixed with Annette Peacock and Slayer mixed with Kate Bush. Azusa's lyrical content, like many of the cousins' previous bands, does contain Christian themes, however, not as "black and white" as they were when the members were younger.

== Members ==
Current

- Eleni Zafiriadou – vocals (2018–present)
- Christer Espevoll – guitars (2014–present)
- Liam Wilson – bass (2014–present)
- David Husvik – drums (2014–present)

Live

- Eirik Kråkenes – guitars (2019–present)

== Discography ==
Studio albums

- Heavy Yoke (2018)
- Loops of Yesterday (2020)

Singles

- "Heavy Yoke" (2018)
- "Interstellar Islands" (2018)
- "First Lines" (2018)
- "Heart of Stone" (2018)
- "Memories of An Old Emotion" (2020)
- "Monument" (2020)
- "Detatch" (2020)
