= Knut Anders Sørum =

Norwegian singer from Østre Toten (born 1976)

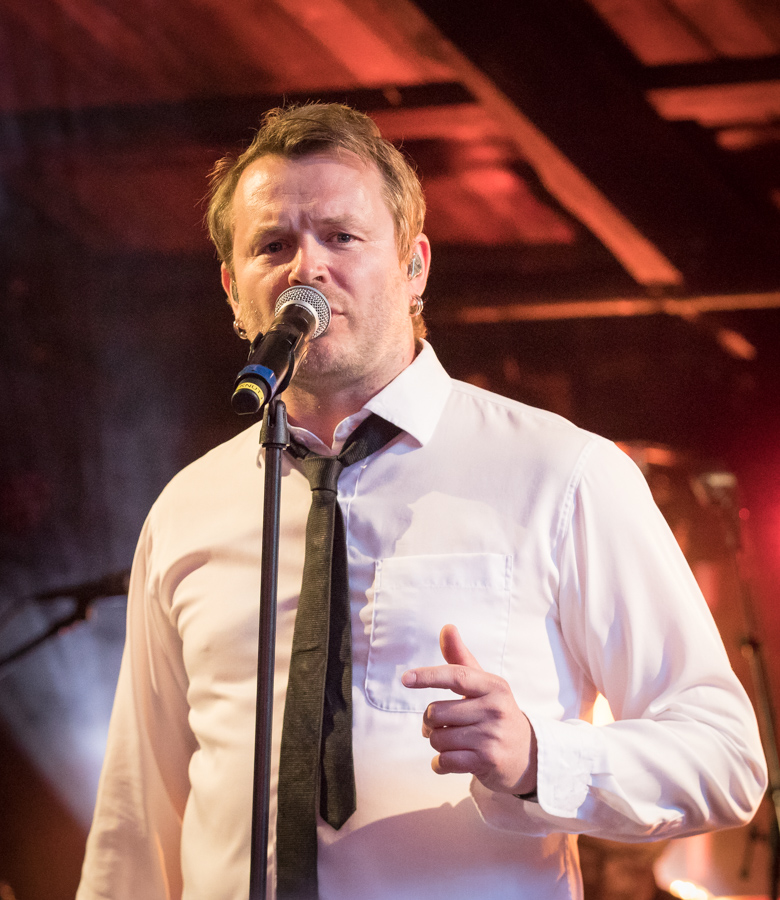

Background information
- Born: Østre Toten, Norway
- Genres: Pop, extreme metal
- Years active: 2004–present
- Labels: daWorks; Kirkelig kulturverksted

Knut Anders Sørum (born 12 April 1976) is a Norwegian singer from Østre Toten Municipality. He represented Norway at Eurovision Song Contest 2004 in Istanbul with the pop-ballad "High". He was also a vocalist and keyboard player for the Norway-based Christian extreme metal band Vardøger for many years (1994-2006, 2007, 2018).

== Eurovision 2004 ==
He won the Norwegian Melodi Grand Prix, the selection process for Eurovision Song Contest in the 2004 contest, gaining the right to represent Norway at Eurovision 2004 in Istanbul with the pop-ballad "High", written by two Swedish composers. In the final, he came last, with just three points, all coming from Sweden.

== Career ==
After Eurovision, Knut Anders Sørum did backing vocals for the Wig Wam 2006 album Wig Wamania.

After a hiatus spending many years, he released his first studio album in 2010 called Prøysen reaching number 12 in the VG-lista, the official Norwegian Albums Chart followed by a second album Ting Flyt that entered at number 7 in its first week of release in May 2013.

== Personal life ==
He is a great supporter of the Salvation Army. He came out as bisexual admitting his attraction to both males and females in an interview with the Norwegian gay magazine Gaysir.

== Discography ==
=== Albums ===
Year	Album	Peak positions	Certification
Year	Album	NOR	Certification
2010	Prøysen	12	
2013	Ting Flyt	5	

Other albums

- 2016: Ting flyt remix
- 2016: Audiens 1:1
- 2017: Knut Anders Sørum Live
- 2019: Dom vonde orda

=== Singles ===
Year	Single	Peak positions	Album
Year	Single	NOR	Album
2004	"High"	20	

== Discography with Vardøger ==
- 2003: Whitefrozen

Preceded by Jostein Hasselgård with "I'm Not Afraid To Move On"	Norway in the Eurovision Song Contest; 2004	Succeeded by Wig Wam with "In My Dreams"
