= The Winepress =

Studio album by The Burial
- Released: August 17, 2010
- Genre: Christian metal, metalcore, progressive metal, mathcore
- Length: 27:26
- Label: Strike First
- Producer: The Burial, Nick Nativo

The Burial chronology
| Age of Deceit (2009) | The Winepress (2010) | Lights and Perfections (2012) |

The Winepress is the first studio album from The Burial. Strike First Records released the album on August 17, 2010. The Burial worked with Nick Nativo, in the production of this album.

== Critical reception ==
Professional ratings
Review scores
| Source | Rating |
|---|---|
| Cross Rhythms | 7/10 squares |
| Indie Vision Music | 4/5 stars |
| Mind Equals Blown | 5/5 stars |
| The New Review | 2.5/5 stars |

Rating the album seven out of ten at Cross Rhythms, Ian Webber writes, "No real element is lacking in this recording which is well played, professionally produced, and reveals glimpses of class, but with a little more refinement and subtle variations this good recording could have been so much better." Steve, giving the album four out of five stars for Indie Vision Music, states, "The Winepress is an excellent album that should be in any metal fan’s album collection. The raw vocals, intense brutality, and technicality are a welcome addition to an oversaturated genre." Awarding the album five stars from Mind Equals Blown, Caleb Martinez says, "The orchestration between all the instruments: diabolically brilliant ... this deviantly twisted musical masterpiece. The Burial has achieved perfection: five stars!" Josh, giving the album two and a half stars by The New Review, states, "The Burial has delivered a record mired in unoriginality and stained with a couple genre clichés, overshadowing the few glimpses of genuine talent and memorable composing. Let us pray for their success and better luck next time – let us pray."

== Track listing ==
| No. | Title | Length |
|---|---|---|
| 1. | "Intercessor" | 2:04 |
| 2. | "Demons Never Sleep" | 3:55 |
| 3. | "The Winepress" | 3:58 |
| 4. | "Reconciliation" | 3:23 |
| 5. | "Valley of Decision" | 2:43 |
| 6. | "Delegation of the Seven Plagues" | 2:49 |
| 7. | "Monolith" | 4:15 |
| 8. | "Death, Conquered" | 4:19 |
| Total length: | | 27:26 |

== Credits ==
The Burial

- David Marshall - Vocals
- Todd Hatfield - Guitar
- Jeff Wright - Guitar
- Jake Neece - Bass
- Randy Rospopo - Drums

Production

- Nick Nativo - Producer, Engineer, Mixing, Mastering
- Eric Bukowski - Engineer
- David DelaGardelle - Artwork
