= Peter Espevoll =

Norwegian vocalist

- Born: 2 October 1979 (age 46)
- Origin: Bærum, Norway
- Genres: Death metal; Thrash metal; Christian metal; Progressive death metal; Progressive metal
- Occupation: Musician
- Instruments: Unclean vocals, guitar
- Years active: 1993-present
- Website: Facebook

Peter Espevoll is a Norwegian vocalist who, in 1993, started the band Extol, with whom he is most associated.

== Background ==
Espevoll was the son of a missionary family, and spent a great deal of time in Kenya, Africa in his life. While in Kenya, he and his brother Christer Espevoll grew an affinity for heavier music, with Peter citing Jerusalem as his first interaction with the genre. Later, bands such as Barren Cross, Stryper, Vengeance Rising, Deliverance, Tourniquet, and Living Sacrifice would hold an influence in his life.

Espevoll began his musical career after his brother Christer Espevoll and cousin David Husvik started Extol in 1993. The band went through several lineup changes with Husvik and Espevoll being the only two constants. Christer later left the band along with longtime guitarist Ole Børud, who would later come back. The band disbanded in 2007, due to personal issues. During his time with Extol, he, his cousin, Tor Magne Glidje, John Robert Mjlånd, and Ole Halvard Sveen, all of the bands Extol, Lengsel, and Mantric, formed a side-project called Ganglion. Ganglion released two EPs, one as a seven-inch. The project became inactive, as did Extol. Espevoll stated that the band ended due to personal issues, for Espevoll, it was to spend time with his family.

Extol reformed in 2012 with the lineup of Espevoll, Husvik, and Børud. Espevoll stated the main reason to reunite the band was "to make the best music possible". During the band's hiatus, Espevoll spent some time in a Mental Facility, due to dealing with stress and anxiety. The band released their fifth self-titled album in 2013. Espevoll's brother and Extol founder Christer Espevoll was supposed to record on the album, but was unable to perform on the album. In 2014, the band went on hiatus after performing some live shows with Ole Vistnes (Shining, Tristana) and Marcus B. (Inevitable End, Miseration). During Extol's hiatus, Espevoll quit the band due to other commitments, leaving Husvik and Borud as sole members.

In late 2020, Espevoll created a new project alongside filmmaker and musician Åsmund Janøy, called Hrada. The name is derived from an old Norwegian word that means “to create”. On April 30, 2021, Hrada signed with Mythic Panda Productions as their first signing. On June 17, 2021, the band released their debut single “Gospel Oak”.

== Personal life ==
Espevoll is married and has three children.

== Discography ==
Extol

Studio albums

- 1998: Burial
- 2000: Undeceived
- 2003: Synergy
- 2005: The Blueprint Dives
- 2013: Extol

EPs

- 1999: Mesmerized
- 2001: Paralysis

Compilations

- 1996: Northern Lights / Norwegian Metal Compilation (Rowe Productions 012)

Videos

- 2015: Of Light and Shade

Ganglion

- 2002: Ganglion (7")
- 2003: Stripped

Hrada

- 2023: Mirrorland
