= In the Taking of Flesh =

Studio album by The Burial
- Released: July 9, 2013
- Genre: Christian metal, melodic death metal, metalcore, technical death metal, progressive metal
- Length: 40:04
- Label: Facedown
- Producer: Josh Schroeder

The Burial chronology
Lights and Perfections (2012)	In the Taking of Flesh (2013)

In the Taking of Flesh is the third studio album from The Burial. Facedown Records released the album on July 9, 2013.

== Critical reception ==
Professional ratings
Review scores
Source	Rating
HM Magazine	4.5/5 stars
Jesus Freak Hideout	4.5/5 stars
Metal Injection	9/10

Awarding the album four and a half stars from HM Magazine, David Stagg states, "Having written almost every note on the album, In the Taking of Flesh is somewhat of a masterpiece." Aaron Lambert, giving the album four and a half stars at Jesus Freak Hideout, writes, "no matter what you believe spiritually, In The Taking of Flesh is an absolutely superb metal album that will end up among the best of the year."

== Track listing ==
All tracks are written by Elisha Mullins.

No.	Title	Length
1.	"En-Hakkore"	5:52
2.	"Itching Ears"	4:38
3.	"In the Taking of Flesh: Theanthropos"	5:25
4.	"In the Taking of Flesh: Diakonos"	4:48
5.	"Wretched Restless Forms"	3:34
6.	"Erchomai"	3:39
7.	"Of Jasper and Carnelian"	4:26
8.	"Thou Knowest"	3:21
9.	"Quintessence"	4:51
Total length:		40:04

== Personnel ==
The Burial

- Elisha Mullins - Vocals, Guitars
- Todd Hatfield - Guitars
- Alex Poole - Bass, Lead Guitar (track 9)
- Kaleb Luebchow - Drums

Guest Musicians

- Rich Catalano - Lead Guitars (track 9)
- Matt Nitti - Lead Guitars (track 9)
- James Houseman - Lead Guitars (track 9), orchestration (track 1)
- Jack Daniels - Lead Guitars (track 9)
- Aaron Metz - Lead Guitars (track 9)
- Drew Creal - Lead Guitars (track 9)

Production

- Ian Sheridan - Bass Engineering
- Josh Schroeder - Producer, Engineer, Mixing, Mastering
- Dave Quiggle - Artwork
