= Mantric (band) =

Norwegian progressive metal band

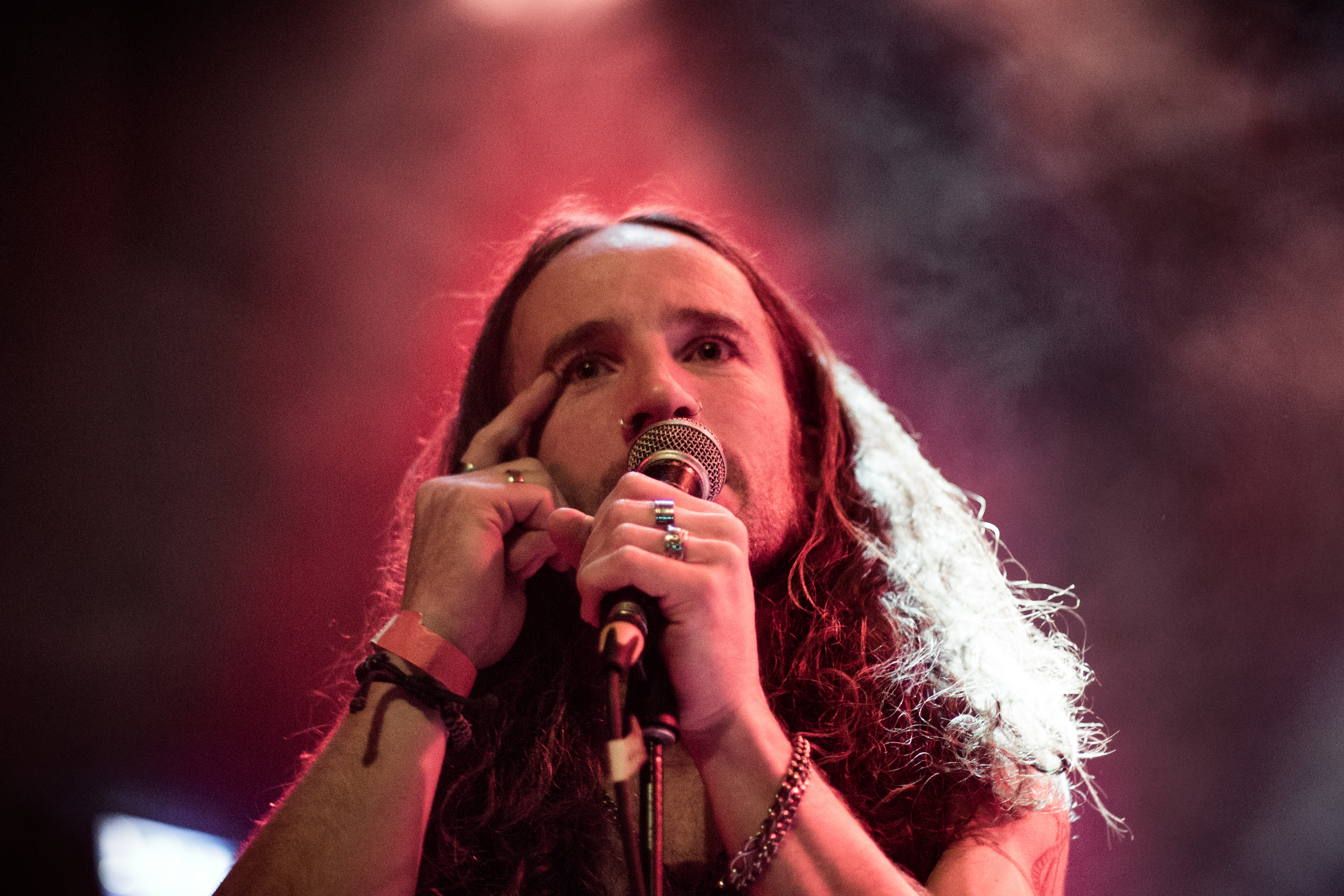

Background information
- Origin: Oslo, Norway
- Genres: Progressive metal, post-metal
- Years active: 2007–present
- Labels: Prosthetic; Loyal Blood; Tooth & Nail; Solid State
- Members: John Mjaaland; Tor Glidje; Ole Sveen; Anders Lidal
- Past members: Kim Akerholdt; David Husvik
- Website: Mantric on Facebook

Mantric is a Norwegian progressive metal band from Oslo that formed in 2007.

== Background ==
When the last remaining founding members of Extol, vocalist Peter Espevoll and drummer David Husvik, decided to end the band in 2007, the remaining members, John Mjaaland, Tor Glidje, Ole Sveen, who had previously played together in Lengsel and Ganglion, decided to continue the already in-progress songwriting process and change the name of the band to Mantric. Husvik was also a part of the first lineup, but eventually left.

The band was signed to Prosthetic Records and released their debut album, The Descent in 2010. The album has received generally positive reviews including 8 out of 10 scores from both Metal Hammer and Decibel. Mantric has since played a handful of shows and festivals in Europe and are currently demoing material for their next album. In 2015, the band released a new song and announced two releases, an EP and a Studio album. In 2015, the band released their sophomore album entitled, Sin, which was well received. The album was said to be of various sounds, mainly progressive metal, but also post metal, death metal, and black metal. On 20 March 2020, it was announced the band had signed with Tooth & Nail / Solid State Records and had released a new single titled "Polyanna". The band is set to release their third album, False Negative on 24 April 2020. On 9 April, the band released "The Towering Mountain".

== Members ==
Current

- John Robert Mjåland – bass, vocals (2007–present)
- Ole Halvard Sveen – vocals, lead guitar, violin, mandolin, squeezebox (2007–present)
- Tor Magne Glidje – rhythm guitar, vocals, percussion (2007–present)

Live musicians

- Anders Salomon Lidal – soundscapes (2007–present)
- David Husvik – drums (2007–2009, 2011)
- Knut Voster - drums (2016)
- Martin Sivertsen Adams – guitar

Former

- Kim Akerholdt – drums (2009–2011)

== Discography ==
Studio albums

- The Descent (2010)
- Sin (2015)
- False Negative (2020)

EPs

- Die Old (2015)

Singles

- "Polyanna" (2020)
- "The Towering Mountain" (2020)
