= The Burial (American band) =

American metal band

- Origin: South Bend, Indiana
- Genres: Christian metal, progressive metalcore, melodic death metal
- Years active: 2005–present
- Labels: Facedown, Strike First, Sancrosanct
- Members: Elisha Mullins; Todd Hatfield; Alex Poole
- Past members: Lukas Chapman; Jake Brewster; Paul Kellner; David Marshall; Jake Neece; Randy Rospopo; Jeff Wright; Kaleb Luebchow
- Website: myspace.com/theburialin

The Burial are an American Christian metalcore/melodic death metal band. Members are from South Bend, Indiana, Benton Harbor, Michigan and Champaign, Illinois. The band started making music in 2005. The band now consists of lead vocalist and guitarist, Elisha Mullins, lead guitarist, Todd Hatfield, drummer, Kaleb Luebchow, and bass guitarist, Alex Poole. The band released one EP, Age of Deceit, in 2009 with Sancrosanct Records. They signed with Strike First Records, where they released, The Winepress, a studio album, in 2010. Their second album, Lights and Perfections, released by Facedown Records in 2012. The subsequent album released by Facedown Records, In the Taking of Flesh, was released in 2013.

== Music history ==
The band commenced as a musical entity in 2006 in South Bend, Indiana. Their first release, Age of Deceit, an EP, was released by Sancrosanct Records in 2009. They released a studio album, The Winepress, on August 17, 2010, with Strike First Records. They signed to Facedown Records, where they released another studio album, Lights and Perfections, on March 27, 2012. Their subsequent studio album, In the Taking of Flesh, was released on July 9, 2013, by Facedown Records.

== Members ==
Current

- Elisha Mullins – vocals (2011–present), guitar (2012–present) (Miss May I, War of Ages, ex-A Hill to Die Upon, ex-Maugrim, Fleshkiller)
- Todd Hatfield – guitar (2005–present)
- Alex Poole – bass (2012–present)

Live musicians

- Kenny Johnson – guitar (Caecus)
- Mike Pingel – guitar (2013)

Former

- Lukas Chapman – vocals (2005–2010)
- Jake Brewster – guitar (2005–2007)
- Randy Rospopo – drums (2005–2012, 2022–present)
- Paul Kellner – guitar (2010) (ex-The Analyst)
- David Marshall – vocals (2009–2011) (Snakehound)
- Jake Neece – bass (2005–2012)
- Jeff Wright – guitar (2010–2012)
- Kaleb Luebchow – drums (2012–2022) (died; 2022) (ex-Dödsmarsch, ex-Hope for the Dying, ex-Caecus, ex-War of Ages)

Timeline

== Discography ==
Studio albums

- The Winepress (August 17, 2010, Strike First)
- Lights and Perfections (March 27, 2012, Facedown)
- In the Taking of Flesh (July 9, 2013, Facedown)

EPs

- Age of Deceit (2009, Sancrosanct)
