= Christer Espevoll =

Norwegian guitarist

- Also known as: Chrztr
- Born: October 18, 1977
- Origin: Bærum, Norway, Europe
- Genres: Progressive death metal; Progressive thrash metal; Extreme metal; Experimental metal; Thrash metal; Folk metal; Christian metal; Technical death metal; Technical thrash metal
- Occupation: Musician
- Instrument: Guitar
- Years active: 1993–present

Christer Espevoll (born October 18, 1977) is a Norwegian guitarist who has been active since 1993. He has performed with notable acts such as Extol and Benea Reach. Christer's brother is Peter Espevoll.

== Background ==
Espevoll started his musical career with his cousin David Husvik and brother Peter Espevoll. Espevoll formed the band with Husvik and then hired on his brother, in the fall of 1993. Espevoll was 16 and his brother was 14 at the formation of the band. Alongside his cousin and brother, the band hired on Ole Børud and Eyestein Holm as Guitarist and Bassist. The band had major success, first starting with labels Solid State Records, moving up to Century Media Records. In 2004, both Espevoll and Børud left the band. After their departure from the band, Espevoll joined Benea Reach, while Børud focused on his solo music. The band released two albums before his departure in 2008. Espevoll has been musically inactive until about 2016, when he formed Azusa with Husvik and Liam Wilson (ex-The Dillinger Escape Plan, John Frum, ex-Frodus). The band recently signed to Extol's former label, Solid State Records, with the addition of Sea + Air's Vocalist Eleni Zafiriadou.

== Bands ==
Current

- Azusa (2014–present)

Former

- Extol (1993-2004)
- Benea Reach (2003-2011)
- Absurd² (1999-2004)

== Discography ==
Extol

Studio albums

- 1998: Burial
- 2000: Undeceived
- 2003: Synergy

EPs

- 1999: Mesmerized
- 2001: Paralysis

Compilations

- 1996: Northern Lights / Norwegian Metal Compilation (Rowe Productions 012)

Benea Reach

- 2006: Monument Bineothan
- 2008: Alleviat

Absurd²

- 2004: Absurd² EP

Azusa

- 2018: Heavy Yoke
- 2020: Loop of Yesterdays
