= Undeceived =

Studio album by Extol
- Released: 20 June 2000
- Genres: Progressive death metal, black metal, Christian death metal, power metal
- Length: 57:20
- Labels: Solid State; Endtime; Century Media
- Producers: Ole Børud, Extol

Extol chronology
Mesmerized (1999)	Undeceived (2000)	Synergy (2003)

Singles from Undeceived
- 1. "And I Watch" / "Human Frailties Grave" Released: 2000

Undeceived is the second LP and third studio release by Norwegian Christian metal band Extol. It was released in 2000 on Solid State Records and re-released in 2002 on Century Media; all releases of the album other than the Solid State version switch the two opening tracks, such that "Undeceived" is the first track on the album.

== Reception ==
Professional ratings
Review scores
Source	Rating
AllMusic	4/5 stars
Chronicles of Chaos	8/10
Lords of Metal	80/100
Metal Hammer Germany	6/7
Whiplash	4.5/5 stars

In 2010, HM magazine placed Undeceived at No. 96 on its Top 100 Christian Rock Albums of All Time list stating that "Burial introduced us to these Nordic Viking metallers, but Undecieved [sic] kicked it up even another notch." It also ranked it No. 5 on its Top 100 Christian metal albums of all-time list.

== Track listing ==
All music is composed by Ole Børud, except where noted.

No.	Title	Lyrics	Music	Length
1.	"Inferno"	Ole Børud		5:15
2.	"Undeceived"	Peter Espevoll		7:07
3.	"Time Stands Still"	Christer Espevoll	C. Espevoll	7:59
4.	"Ember"	C. Espevoll		6:30
5.	"Meadows of Silence" (instrumental)			1:28
6.	"Shelter"	P. Espevoll	Børud, C. Espevoll	6:16
7.	"A Structure of Souls"	Børud		4:13
8.	"Of Light and Shade"	David Husvik		4:47
9.	"Where Sleep Is Rest" (instrumental)			3:18
10.	"Renewal"	Børud	Børud, C. Espevoll	5:06
11.	"Abandoned" (instrumental)		Jan Carleklev	0:54
12.	"And I Watch"	Børud		4:33
Total length:				57:20

Japanese edition
No.	Title	Length
13.	"Human Frailties Grave"	4:34
14.	"Enthralled" (from Mesmerized)	3:58
15.	"Storms of Disillusions" (from Mesmerized)	5:08
Total length:		71:00

German Century Media re-release
No.	Title	Music	Length
13.	"Human Frailties Grave"		4:34
14.	"Shadow of Death" (Believer cover)	Dave Baddorf, Howe Kraft, Joey Daub, Kurt Bachman	3:38
Total length:			65:32

== Personnel ==
Extol

- Peter Espevoll – lead vocals
- Ole Børud – guitar, clean vocals
- Christer Espevoll – guitar, backing vocals
- Tor Magne Glidje – bass guitar
- David Husvik – drums, backing vocals

Additional musicians

- Tarjei Nysted – violins on "Undeceived", "Inferno", and "Ember"; brass on "Undeceived"
- Ida Mo – cello on "Undeceived"

Production

- Producers – Extol, Ole Børud
