= A Hill to Die Upon =

American blackened death metal band

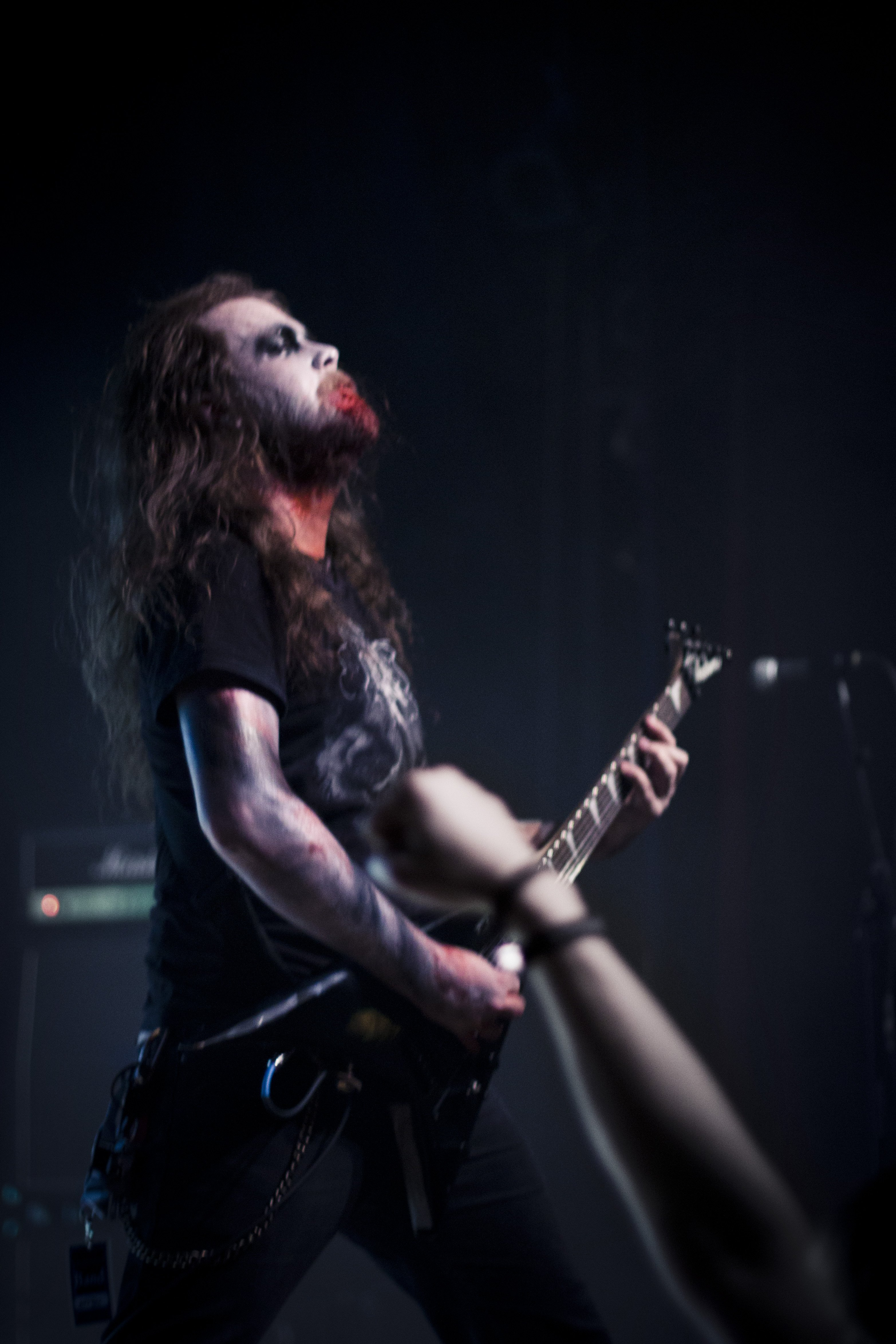
- A Hill to Die Upon performing at Elements of Rock in 2012

Background information
- Origin: Monmouth-Galesburg, Illinois, United States
- Genres: Blackened death metal, melodic death metal
- Years active: 2004–present
- Labels: Bombworks, Luxor, Mythic Panda
- Members: Adam Cook; R. Michael Cook; Nolan Osmond
- Past members: Adam Gross; Andreas Larsen; Drew Webster; Elisha Mullins; Josh Christianson; Eli Kelly; Austin Kelly; Josiah Boyd; Levi Wiwe Rauff; Ravn "Jokull" Furfjod; Ryan Lamb; Steve Southard; Mike Pingel; Brent Dossett
- Website: Bandcamp

A Hill To Die Upon is an American blackened death metal band from the Monmouth-Galesburg area of Illinois, formed in 2004 by the brothers Adam and R. Michael Cook. The brothers initially founded the band as hardcore project, but eventually started listening to death and black metal, which led them to transform their band's sound. Over the years, various musicians have filled out the band's lineup, which currently consists of the Cook brothers and Nolan Osmond. Signed to Bombworks Records, A Hill to Die Upon has released five albums – Infinite Titanic Immortal in 2009, Omens in 2011, Holy Despair in 2014, Via Artis, Via Mortis in 2017, and The Black Nativity in 2023 - all to a positive critical reception. In 2013, the band also released a stand-alone single, "Manden med Leen". Musically, the band is compared primarily to Behemoth as well as Immortal, Naglfar, and Old Man's Child, all of which the brothers cite as among their major influences. The brothers are Christian, but they distance themselves from calling A Hill to Die Upon a Christian metal band. Lyrical themes include mythology, war, philosophy, and despair, with references drawn from the Bible and numerous literary works and authors.

== History ==
=== Formation (2004–2008) ===
Adam and R. Michael Cook founded A Hill to Die Upon as a hardcore and metalcore band in 2004 in Monmouth, Illinois. Michael explains that he and Adam simply wanted to play extreme music, and hardcore was easier to play than metal. He concedes that had they tried to play metal at the time, they "would have sucked." Also, in 2004, the hardcore scene was very strong in the Midwest, enabling the brothers, as a two-piece band, to play some live shows in Illinois and Iowa. Had the brothers played extreme metal at the time, they would have been the only band in the area and thus would have struggled to book shows. The brothers played their first show in Burlington, Iowa, performing mostly Norma Jean and As I Lay Dying cover songs. Over time, they started listening to death and black metal, and as a consequence gradually took their band in a faster, darker, and more aggressive direction.

=== Record deal; Infinite Titanic Immortal (2008–2010) ===
In 2008, A Hill to Die Upon recorded a demo, which led to a record deal with Bombworks Records. In December of that year, it was announced that the band was recording Infinite Titanic Immortal, which was set for release in June 2009. The album was recorded by Kevin Rendleman at Trash Rocket Studios in Peoria, Illinois, and mixed at Dark Chamber Studios by Eric Tordsson, a former member of Crimson Moonlight. The band would go on to play Destruction Fest, alongside bands such as Ashen Mortality, Antidemon, and Solace the Day. Infinite Titanic Immortal was released on July 21, 2009.

=== Omens (2011–2012) ===
In a 2014 interview with HM, Adam Cook revealed that the recording process for Omens, A Hill to Die Upon's second studio album, lasted about eight days. He stated that "we never had any real demos of the songs before going into the studio." Omens was released on May 23, 2011. Chris Gato of HM awarded the album three and a half stars. He wrote that "This is a brilliant album, and there is much to love about it, but the doomy feel this time around seems to dull the brilliance sometimes, making Omens a point below Infinite." Taylor C. from Indie Vision Music gave the album a full five stars, stating that "this album is awful in the olden sense of the word—full of awe."

=== Holy Despair and Via Artis, Via Mortis (2013–present) ===
On February 12, 2013, the band released a single titled "Manden Med Leen" (Danish for the Grim Reaper). The band's third studio album, Holy Despair, was released on April 8, 2014 in a compact disc format, and subsequently on April 22, 2014 in digital download format. Unlike the quick recording process for Omens, the production of Holy Despair was longer and encountered delays. The album was funded largely through an Indiegogo crowdfunding campaign, which lengthened the recording process. Also, in 2013 the small studio in Adam's basement flooded. While most of the instruments and equipment were salvaged, this delayed the band for three or four months. However, Adam considers that in the long run, these delays allowed the band to spend more time in songwriting and improving the final product on the album. Critical reception to the album was positive. Metal Forces rated the album eight-and-a-half out of ten, concluding that

Holy Despair offers so much depth and intelligence that a majority of black metal bands in their unholy ignorance should take heed, because A Hill To Die Upon may not be the anti-Gods you've had rammed down your throats for decades, but as black metal musicians they are the new messiahs on the block.

Metal Storm scored the album 7.8 out of ten. The band is currently working on something set for March 2017. On August 11, 2017, the band announced they had signed to Luxor Records. The band also released a single titled "Jubal and Syrinx", off of their upcoming album, Via Artis, Via Mortis the same day.

On January 6, 2022, it was announced that the band had signed with a new label, Mythic Panda Productions, which had previously put on the Hasten Revelation Tour that they had embarked on in 2019. In early 2022, Michael Cook gave an interview with HM Magazine revealing the new material coming would be known as The Black Nativity. Cook also revealed that it would be "much too small" to be deemed a single record.

== Style, lyrics, and influences ==
The music of A Hill to Die Upon has been described as blackened death metal, and more specifically as a mix of melodic death metal and melodic black metal. The band often compared to Behemoth as well as Immortal, Naglfar, and Old Man's Child. The brothers cite all of those artists as influences, as well other extreme metal artists such as Satyricon, 1349, Watain, and Keep of Kalessin. A Hill to Die Upon also cites less extreme artists such as mewithoutYou, Eric Church, and Empire of the Sun as influences. mewithoutYou and its primary songwriter Aaron Weiss are particularly cited by Michael Cook as inspiring his lyrical content. On Omens and Holy Despair, the band also included covers of a traditional folk song: "Satan, Your Kingdom Must Come Down" and "O, Death", respectively. "O, Death" included a collaboration with harpist and singer Timbre.

The band is noted for not being particularly innovative, but with very strong songwriting. The band explained that

We aren't too concerned about being overly original. A lot of people spend a great deal of energy trying to be new, but they waste energy they could spend being good. We would rather put out quality art than subpar original art. We are convinced that originality will happen, but it is not our focus.

Michael told HM that his outlook on music changed when he encountered J. R. R. Tolkien's idea that there is only one original story, and all other stories are variations on that story. He stated that "Art that tries to break the boundaries for its own sake will probably not accomplish much. However, if someone tried to be the best artist at what they know (painting, country, jazz), innovation will happen. Longinus discusses this in his work, 'On the Sublime.'"

The band's lyrics deal with mythology, war, philosophy, and despair. Michael noted to HM that themes of despair in particular were present on the band's first two albums, though are much more prominent on Holy Despair. Tolkien has influenced much of the band's imagery and lyrics – the cover art of Infinite Titanic Immortal features a Lord of the Rings-inspired landscape, while Omens even includes lyrics written in Tolkien's Elvish languages. Holy Despair was written with mindset that 2014, its release date, was the 100-year anniversary of World War I, and thus deals with that war extensively. In its philosophical discussions of war, the album draws on various authors such as Tolkien, Erich Maria Remarque, Stephen Crane, and, especially, W. B. Yeats. The final song is an adaption of a poem by C. S. Lewis.

While the brothers are Christian, they distance themselves from the label of a "Christian band". In an interview with Detonation Magazine, the brothers stated that

Now, I think we are less irritated with the label of a 'Christian band' even though we don't really believe it helps anything. Adam and I serve Yahweh and believe that Jesus of Nazareth was his son. That has a lot do with our music. Whether you call that a 'Christian band' is kind of up to who is doing the labelling. We aren't really sure.

In HM, Michael explained that "We all want hear songs about who we like to think we are... Metalheads want to hear songs that say it's OK to not believe in a god. Christian metalheads want to hear metal songs that say it's OK to be a Christian. It all sounds really negative when you say it like this, but it's true, though it isn’t necessarily a bad thing."

== Members ==
Current members

- Adam Cook – vocals, guitar (2004–present), bass (2019–present)
- Michael Cook – drums, vocals (2004–present)
- Nolan Osmond – guitar (2012–present)

Former members

- Drew Webster – guitar
- Elisha Mullins – guitar, bass (2004–2011) (Fleshkiller, The Burial, War of Ages, Miss May I)
- Josh Christianson – bass (2012–2013) (2014; touring musician)
- Steve Southard – vocals (2006–2009)
- Josiah Timothy Boyd – bass (died; 2018)
- Tanner Jones – guitars, vocals (2016–2017)
- Brent Dossett – bass, vocals (2016–2019)

Former touring musicians

- Levi Wiwe Rauff – bass (2012–2014)
- Ravn "Jokull" Furfjod – bass, backing vocals (2009–2010) (Frosthardr)
- Andreas Larsen – bass (2011)
- Ryan Lamv – bass (2011)
- Mike Pingel – guitar (2014–2016)

== Discography ==
Studio albums

- Infinite Titanic Immortal (July 21, 2009, Bombworks)
- Omens (May 23, 2011, Bombworks)
- Holy Despair (April 8, 2014, Bombworks)
- Via Artis, Via Mortis (September 15, 2017, Luxor)
- The Black Nativity (November 24, 2023, Rottweiler Records)

Demo

- Demo (2008)

Singles

- "Manden Med Leen" (February 12, 2013, Bombworks)
