= Vardøger (band) =

Norwegian Christian extreme metal band

- Also known as: Hidden Paradise
- Origin: Hamar, Norway
- Genres: Extreme metal; folk metal; folk music; progressive metal; Viking metal
- Years active: 1994–1997, 2003–2006, 2007, 2008–2018
- Labels: Endtime, Starbreather
- Past members: Peter Dalbakk; Alexander Dalbakk; Robert Bordevik; Johanne B. Bordevik; Knut Anders Sørum; Henning Ramseth; Johannes Baumann; Jo Henning Børven; Tom Arne Fossheim; Stian Aarebrot; Magnus Westgaard; Jørn Øyhus; Bedevaart

Vardøger was a Christian extreme metal band from Hamar, Norway. Formed in 1994 under the name Hidden Paradise, the members of the band at the time were all involved in other musical projects and so treated Hidden Paradise as a side project. Several songs were written between 1995 and 1997, almost enough for an entire album, and the band changed its name to Vardøger, but the group disbanded before an album could be released. In 2000, the band contributed the symphonic black metal song "Footprints of Thunder" to the compilation album In the Shadow of Death: A Scandinavian Extreme Music Compilation. The song was covered in 2019 by Irgalom on their Meditate I album.

Vardøger reformed and eventually released an EP, Whitefrozen, in 2003 through Endtime Productions. The recording was received well by critics and is considered a classic. The style on that album was described as unblack metal, black metal mixed with folk music, black and folk metal, atmospheric black metal, and Viking metal. The band was compared to Amorphis and Schaliach, the latter project being the primary focus of Vardøger member Peter Dalbakk, as well as Antestor and Pospolite Ruszenie. The same year, the band played at Nordic Fest in Oslo, Norway.

In 2006, Vardøger was disbanded due to lack of interest from the musicians. although the band did play again at Endtime Festival in 2007. The band reformed the next year and began song-writing. A major lineup change occurred in 2010, and the band started recording full-length album, Ghost Notes, which was released in 2015 through Starbreather Productions. Though the band is known for playing black metal, on this release it expanded its sound to progressive metal, extreme metal, and melodic death metal. Ghost Notes was compared to the output of Kekal, Extol, Gojira, and Opeth. In 2018, Vardøger announced that it would once again disband.

== Discography ==
=== Studio albums ===
- Ghost Notes (2015)

=== Extended plays ===
- Whitefrozen (2003)

=== Compilation appearances ===
- In the Shadow of Death: A Scandinavian Extreme Music Compilation (2000) - Contributed "Footprints of Thunder"
- Come Armageddon - Endtime Productions V Years (2 Disc) (2003)
  - Disc 1: LP version contains "Footprints of Thunder", CD version contains "Silent Witness"
  - Disc 2: Contains "Almighty"

== Band members ==
=== Final Line-up ===
- Robert Bordevik – guitar (1994–1997, 2003–2006, 2007, 2008–2018), lead vocals (2017–2018)
- Alexander Dalbakk – guitar (2010–2018)
- Henning Ramseth – bass, keyboard (2010–2018)
- Jo Henning Børven – drums (2003–2006, 2007, 2017–2018)
- Jørn Øyhus – sung vocals (2017–2018)
- Knut Anders Sørum – vocals, keyboard (1994–2006, 2007), vocals (2018)

=== Former Members ===
- Peter Dalbakk – lead vocals (1994–1997, 2003–2006, 2007, 2008–2017)
- Tom Arne Fossheim – drums (1994–1997, 2003–2006, 2008–2010)
- Johannes Baumann – drums (2010–2017)
- Stian Aarebrot – guitar (1994–1997, 2003–2006, 2007, 2008–2010)
- Magnus Westgaard – bass (2003–2006, 2007, 2008–2010) (also of Absurd²)
- Johanne B. Bordevik – sung vocals (2010–2017)
- Bedevaart – sung vocals (2017)
