= Schaliach =

Norwegian Christian death-doom metal band

- Origin: Hamar, Norway
- Genres: Christian metal; death-doom; melodic death metal; progressive metal
- Years active: 1995–2000
- Labels: Petroleum, Rowe, Endtime
- Spinoffs: Fleshkiller
- Past members: Peter Dalbakk; Ole Børud

Schaliach was a Christian metal band formed by Peter Dalbakk and Ole Børud in Hamar, Norway. Dalbakk sang while Børud played instruments. In 1995, the duo released a three-song demo. The following year, they debuted with studio album Sonrise in 1996, through Petroleum Records. Three songs from that recording were featured on the Rowe Productions compilation album Northern Lights: Norwegian Metal Compilation, released in 1996. The band contributed "Purple Filter" to the compilation album In the Shadow of Death: A Scandinavian Extreme Music Compilation, released in 2000 through Endtime Productions. "Purple Filter" was a bonus track on the 2005 release of Sonrise. Dalbakk was part of unblack metal band Vardøger, and Børud joined progressive death metal band Extol and started a solo career. The two reunited in 2015 to found progressive death metal project Fleshkiller.

== Genre and style ==
The band was described as doom metal, death metal, melodic death metal, death-doom, gothic metal, black metal, and progressive metal. Classical music influenced Børud's guitar work. One reviewer described it as a "metal symphony." Its lyrics drew from the Bible and emphasized God's love. Schaliach has been compared to Amorphis, Metallica, Solitude Aeturnus, Dream Theater, Threshold, Shadow Gallery, and Teramaze.

== Discography ==
- Sonrise - 1996
- Northern Lights: Norwegian Metal Compilation - 1996
  1. "The Last Creed"
  2. "You Maintain"
  3. "Coming of the Dawn"
- In the Shadow of Death - A Scandinavian Extreme Music Compilation - 2000: Contributed "Purple Filter"

== Band members ==
- Peter Dalbakk – vocals
- Ole Børud – guitar, bass, drums
