= Extol =

Norwegian Christian metal band

- Origin: Bekkestua, Norway
- Genres: Christian metal; progressive metal; death metal; black metal; thrash metal
- Years active: 1993–2007, 2012–2017, 2023–present
- Labels: Century Media; Endtime; Facedown; Solid State; Indie; Rowe
- Members: Peter Espevoll; David Husvik; Christer Espevoll; Ole Børud
- Past members: Eystein Holm; John Robert Mjåland; Emil Nikolaisen; Ole Halvard Sveen; Tor Magne Glidje

Extol is a Norwegian Christian metal band from Bekkestua, formed in 1993. The band is known for playing different styles of metal, including progressive metal, death metal, black metal and thrash metal.

Over the course of their career, the band has released five studio albums and two EPs, beginning with their debut, Burial, in 1998. The band are noted for their precise, technical musicianship. The fourth album, The Blueprint Dives, received a Spellemannsprisen nomination for Best Metal Album of 2005. Extol has toured the United States and Europe several times with such bands as Mastodon, God Forbid and Opeth. Extol has sold over 500,000 albums worldwide.

The last line-up before the hiatus included vocalist Peter Espevoll, guitarists Tor Magne Glidje and Ole Halvard Sveen, drummer David Husvik, and bass player John Robert Mjåland. Notable original guitarists were Ole Børud (of Schaliach fame) and Christer Espevoll, who contributed to the band's songwriting. After reforming in 2012, the band consisted of Peter Espevoll, Husvik, and Børud. The band released its fifth album, Extol, in 2013. The band went on hiatus from 2017 until 2023. The band reformed in 2023 with Peter and Christer Espevoll, David Husvik, and Ole Børud.

== History ==
=== 1993–1999: Formation and Burial ===
Sixteen-year-old cousins, drummer David Husvik and guitarist Christer Espevoll, formed Extol in Bekkestua, Norway. The two had played together since fall 1993, and wanted to start a band. Christer's 14-year-old brother, Peter, was recruited to sing. Bassist Eystein Holm joined on 17 May 1994, as the band was rehearsing for a show that day. In an interview, Peter explained the band's name: "Extol means to exalt, to lift up what you give glory to, and that's what's we're all about. We want to give God all the glory with our lives and with our music." Extol wanted to expand their style beyond regular heavy metal music. According to AllMusic writer Mike DaRonco, the band intended to show "more of a progressive side; rather than a typical run of the mill group of burnouts who focused more on their image." The style change required another guitarist, a position Emil Nikolaisen of the band Royal filled in 1995.

The group garnered a reputation in the local scene. In January 1996, Extol made their first record appearance on a Norwegian metal compilation called Northern Lights. The album featured other local Christian artists Antestor, Schaliach, and Groms. Steve Rowe of Australian Christian metal band Mortification released the compilation on his record label, Rowe Productions. The band traveled to Stockholm, Sweden, two months later for their first show outside Norway. At the end of 1996, Nikolaisen departed so he could devote more time to Royal, and was replaced with Ole Børud of Schaliach and Arnold B Family.

In 1997, Extol released the independent three-song demo Embraced. They recorded a studio album at the end of the year even though they didn't have a record deal. Almost a year passed before Endtime Productions picked up the band. Their debut album, Burial, was released in December 1998. The album was licensed in the United States on Solid State Records, and in Japan on Avalon Records. Critical reception was positive from Christian and secular publications. DaRonco commented that it was "a breath of fresh air among a genre that relies on satanic gimmicks."

Shortly after, the band played their first shows in the US at Cornerstone Festival and Texas Rockfest. Extol conducted a four-week tour with Swedish rock band Blindside in summer 1999. An EP, Mesmerized, was released in November. It featured three remixed tracks from Burial, reworked by Swedish industrial groups Raison d'être and Sanctum, and three other songs: a recently recorded one, an outtake, and a track from the Japanese release. Fan reception was generally negative. Holm left the band and was replaced with Tor Magne Glidje, who played guitar in the Norwegian metal band Lengsel.

=== 2000–2003: Undeceived and Synergy ===
Extol returned to the studio in December 1999 to record a follow-up album. In June 2000, their second studio album, Undeceived, was released. Their music became "harder and darker" than their previous work, move towards a death metal sound. The song "Ember" was popular among their fans. Børud left the band, so Glidje switched to guitar, and John Robert Mjåland joined as bassist.

In 2001, they recorded the EP Paralysis. It was only released in Sweden. This EP featured a cover of "Shadow of Death" by American thrash metal group Believer, whom the band consider a great influence. After Paralysis, Glidje left the band to focus on his other project, Ganglion, and Børud returned to the line-up. After Undeceived was released, Extol signed with Century Media in 2002. Their album, Synergy, released in 2003, showed an greater appreciation of the band Believer and their thrash metal. Following the release, Extol toured Europe and US with Swedish progressive death metal group Opeth.

=== 2004–2008: The Blueprint Dives and hiatus ===
In June 2004, Børud and Christer Espevoll left Extol to "invest their time and energy elsewhere". Taking their place as permanent members in the band were Tor Magne Glidje and Ole Halvard Sveen, both from Ganglion, which merged with Extol when four out of five band members ended up playing in both bands.

In 2005, the band released what could be considered their most diverse album, The Blueprint Dives. A music video was shot for the song "Pearl". The album was nominated for the Norwegian Grammy, Spellemannprisen, for best Norwegian metal album in 2005. The album was voted among the top five metal albums of the year by readers of Norway's largest newspaper, Dagbladet. Afterwards, Extol toured Europe with Mastodon, God Forbid, and Opeth, and the US with Winter Solstice, Becoming the Archetype, and The Showdown. The album received rave reviews: Eduardo Rivadavia of AllMusic gave the album 4.5/5 and writes that "to Extol's greatest credit, offhand comparisons to other bands are almost impossible!" According to Glidje, a majority of the songs on The Blueprint Dives had previously been written as Ganglion songs.

On 9 August 2007, the band announced through their MySpace page that they were taking a hiatus. Glidje, Mjåland and Sveen went on to form Mantric, signed to Prosthetic Records. Husvik joined Dr. Midnight and the Mercy Cult, which includes members from Turbonegro, Apoptygma Berzerk and Satyricon.

=== 2012–present: Documentary, Extol, hiatus and Aura of Decay ===
In 2012, Extol reformed as a trio consisting of Peter Espevoll, Husvik, and Børud, and announced that a documentary about the band, titled Extol: of Light and Shade, was being produced. On 23 April 2013, Extol announced that their fifth album, Extol, was to be released in June. Upon this announcement, the single "Open the Gates" was released for streaming on YouTube. Indie Recordings released the album on 21 June in Norway, Germany, and Austria, and on 24 June worldwide. Facedown Records released the album on 25 June for North America. The album debuted at No. 23 on the Billboard Top Christian Albums chart. In July 2014, the band performed their first live concert since 2006. On 17 July, they introduced the names of the additional two touring members: Marcus Bertilsson (Inevitable End, Miseration) on guitar and Ole Vistnes (Shining, Tristania, Fleshkiller) on bass. The documentary was later released. The band made it onto a list of the top 20 best Norwegian progressive metal bands in 2017. The band went on hiatus until 2023. During the hiatus, Espevoll quit the band due to other commitments, leaving Husvik and Børud as sole members. Husvik went on to play in a project called Azusa with Christer Espevoll, one of the original members, while Børud went on to perform in Fleshkiller.

On 18 January 2023, Extol announced a reunion for Furnace Fest of 2023, hosted in Alabama, alongside additional reunited acts A Plea for Purging, Training for Utopia, Haste the Day and Becoming the Archetype. Unfortunately, citing visa issues, they were forced to withdraw less than a week before the event. Shortly after, it was announced Extol would also do a European reunion show for Brainstorm Festival on 4 November 2023, in Apeldoorn, The Netherlands, alongside acts like Xandria, Serenity, Temperance and In Vain. With the announcements, they released the band's live lineup consisting of Husvik, Børud, Christer Espevoll, Tor Magne Glidje, and vocalist Elisha Mullins (A Hill to Die Upon, War of Ages, Fleshkiller). The band expressed their want for Peter to return but that he had other commitments. They also teased new music with Peter on August 10. On 6 September 2024 Furnace Fest announced Extol would be playing at the fest in 2024 and visas had already been secured.

On 20 August 2026, after posting teasers on social media earlier in the year, Extol released a new single, "The One and the Many", in conjunction with the announcement of their sixth studio album Aura of Decay, which was released on 6 November 2026.

== Influences ==
During the early 2000s, the band cited influence from Believer, Death, Galactic Cowboys, Meshuggah, early Mortification, Rush, and early Tourniquet. Christer Espevoll stated in an interview that the primary influences for his guitar playing were bandmates Emil Nikolaisen and Ole Børud. In an interview after the release of 2005's The Blueprint Dives, the band cited influences from A-ha, Anathema, Believer, Nick Cave, The Crucified, The Cure, Cynic, Death, Faith No More, Kings X, Metallica, Joni Mitchell, Refused, Sixteen Horsepower, Tool, and Tourniquet, among others. After the reformation of the band in 2012, Børud stated in one interview that his influences range "from Death to Yes to Steely Dan to Jason Falkner and so forth." In another interview, he cited the band's influences as "old stuff such as Rush, Genesis or Yes. But it could as easily be an old church hymn or a jazz tune from Chris Potter. Or it might even be just a mood from a certain day that will trigger a certain melody. As far as groove and beat goes we are all fans of the old school death metal approach such as old Death, Pestilence and all of those guys."

== Band members ==
Current members

- Ole Børud – guitar, sung vocals (1996–2000, 2003–2004, 2012–2017, 2023–present), bass (2012–2017, 2023–present), flute (1996–1999)
- Christer Espevoll – guitar (1993–2004, 2023–present), bass (2023–present)
- David Husvik – drums, backing vocals (1993–2007, 2012–2017, 2023–present)
- Peter Espevoll – lead vocals (1993–2007, 2012–2017, 2023–present)

Former members

- Eystein Holm – bass (1993–1999)
- Emil Nikolaisen – guitar (1995–1996)
- John Robert Mjåland – bass (2001–2007)
- Ole Halvard Sveen – guitar, vocals (2004–2007)
- Tor Magne Glidje – bass (1999–2001, 2023 [Live]), guitars (2004–2007)

Live musicians

- Ole Vistnes – bass (2014–2017)
- Marcus Bertilsson – guitar (2014–2017)
- Elisha Mullins - vocals (2023–2024)
- Bruce Fitzhugh - vocals (2024–2025)
- Sven-Erik Lind - vocals (2026-present)

Timeline

== Discography ==
Studio albums

- 1998: Burial
- 2000: Undeceived
- 2003: Synergy
- 2005: The Blueprint Dives
- 2013: Extol
- 2026: Aura of Decay

EPs

- 1999: Mesmerized
- 2001: Paralysis
- 2023: Labyrinth of Ill / Exigency

Compilations

- 1996: Northern Lights / Norwegian Metal Compilation (Rowe Productions 012)

Videos

- 2015: Of Light and Shade
