= Ole Børud =

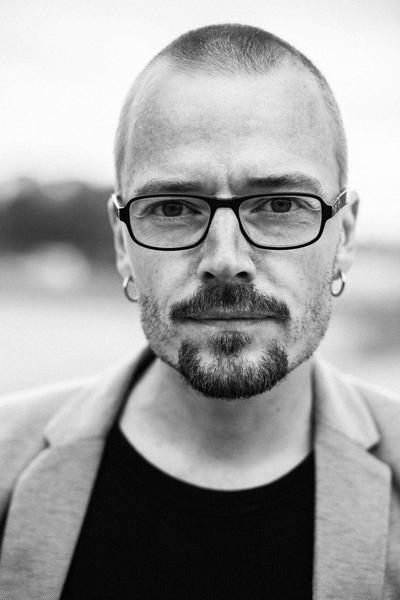
- Born: 6 December 1976 (age 49); Hamar, Norway
- Occupations: Singer; musician; songwriter; producer; recording engineer
- Relatives: Arnold Børud (father); Anne Marie Børud(mother); Thomas Børud (brother); Hilde Stavnem Børud (spouse); Lisa Børud(niece)
- Musical career
- Genres: Children's; choral; Christian metal; CCM; extreme metal; Gospel; hardcore punk; hymn; jazz pop; progressive metal; pop rock; r&b; soul; yacht rock
- Instruments: Vocals; guitar; bass; keyboards; drums
- Years active: 1981–present
- Labels: Connection; Master; OBM; Village Again; Century Media; Facedown; Indie; Solid State; Linx; Petroleum; Rowe; Tvers; Mudi; Strokeland; Grammofon; IKO-Forlaget; Lynor; Naxos Sweden; Fablos; Barrattmusic Norway
- Member of: Fleshkiller; Extol
- Formerly of: Schaliach; Arnold B. Family; Selfmindead; Antestor; Oslo Gospel Choir; Oslo Kristne Senter; Ungfila
- Website: facebook.com/pg/oleborudmusic

Ole Arnold Børud (born 6 December 1976) is a Norwegian singer, songwriter, multi-instrumentalist, producer, and audio engineer. He is known both for his solo recordings and as a member of the groups Arnold B. Family, Schaliach, Extol, and Fleshkiller.

Børud, son of the gospel singers Arnold Børud and Anne Marie Børud, began performing music at age five as part of Arnold B. Family, a group which would compete in the Melodi Grand Prix three times. At age twelve, he released a Christian children's music album. He later ventured into heavy metal, first in the two-man project Schaliach and then in Extol. He also briefly joined the hardcore punk band Selfmindead. Since the early 2000s, he has also recorded several solo albums in West Coast, pop, funk, and jazz styles: Chi-Rho (2002), Shakin' the Ground (2008), Keep Movin (2011), Someday at Christmas (2012, in collaboration with Samuel Ljungblahd), Stepping Up (2014), Outside the Limit (2019) and Soul Letters (2022).

He re-joined Extol in 2012, and in 2016 he co-founded a heavy metal side-project, Fleshkiller. Børud has also performed for Torun Eriksen and Sofian, and collaborated with Larvik Stroband and the Oslo Gospel Choir. In 2008, he contributed to the hymn compilation, Takk, gode Gud, for alle ting: 20 sanger fra Barnesalmeboka. He has regularly appeared on various Norwegian television shows, including Det store korslaget and Stjernekamp, and in 2017 provided backing choral vocals in Jowst's performance of "Grab the Moment" in the 2017 Eurovision contest.

== Musical career ==
=== Arnold B. Family and childhood career ===
Born Ole Arnold Børud in Hamar, Norway, he started his musical career at the age of five years as a singer in his family's Christian pop group Børud-gjengen, later renamed Arnold B. Family. Highly popular within Norway, Arnold B. Family participated three times in the national finals for the Eurovision Song Contest, landing in the top ten all three times. The group took second place in 1995 for its song "La oss feire livet" ("Let Us Celebrate Life"). For the group's recording of Livslyst (1995), Børud experimented with rapping.

In 1987, Børud was featured as part of the children's choir for the musical "Det Gode Landet" by Eyvind Skeie and Sigvald Tveit. In 1988, at age twelve, he made a solo debut with the Christian children's album Alle Skal Få Vite Det!. Børud has said that he no longer remembers much about the recording sessions. Almost thirty years later, in 2017, his niece Lisa Børud sang the song "Kjærligheten seirer" ("Love Wins") from the album when she competed in the talent show Stjernekamp.

=== Heavy metal and hard rock ===
In the 1990s, Børud ventured into heavy metal, teaming up in 1995 with Peter Dalbakk to form a short-lived doom metal project called Schaliach, for which he played guitar, bass and drums. The group released one album, Sonrise, in 1996. He briefly was part of the band Antestor. He joined Extol in 1996, where he played guitar and bass and provided background singing. After recording two albums with the group, Burial and Undeceived, he left to further pursue his solo career in 2001, but briefly rejoined the group to record its third album, Synergy. In 2012, he rejoined the group, which reformed as a trio, and helped record its fifth, self-titled release. In the early 2000s, he also served for a brief period as a guitarist for the hardcore punk band Selfmindead. On 12 February 2016, Peter Espevoll of Extol announced that Børud had formed a new side-project, Fleshkiller, with his former Schaliach bandmate Dalbakk. Børud himself later announced that drummer Andreas Skorpe Sjøen also joined the band. In January 2017, it was announced that Dalbakk left the band and was replaced by Elisha Mullins. The first studio album, Awaken, debuted 15 September 2017. Børud also was featured as a vocalist and guitarist on the progressive death metal band Cognizance's single "Malignant Domain", released 22 August 2019. On 21 April 2023, Børud guest featured on the song and accompanying music video for "Mouthless Embassy" by Kallias. Extol again reformed in 2023, with Børud included in the lineup, and released a pair of singles, “Labyrinth of Ill” and “Exigency”, on 12 October 2023.

=== As a solo artist ===
Børud's first solo release as an adult, Chi-Rho (2002), featured a pop rock sound and consisted of covers of various Christian music performers such as Whiteheart, Dogs of Peace, and Rebecca St. James. However, Børud considers his subsequent release, Shakin' the Ground, his true solo debut, as it was the first featuring original music. In 2011, he released Keep Movin, which peaked at no. 27 on the Norwegian charts and no. 15 on the Swedish charts. That same year, he performed live with Santa Fe and the Fat City Horns, a concert which was later released on DVD in 2013. In 2013 he collaborated with Samuel Ljungblahd for a Christmas album, Someday At Christmas. The album charted at no. 39 in Norway and no. 13 in Sweden. That year Børud also released a best-of compilation, The Best. His next studio release was Stepping Up, released on 24 November 2014. On 18 January 2019, Trine Rein featured Børud on her single "Where Do We Go". Outside the Limit, Børud's next studio album, was released on 20 September 2019. Three singles have been released for Outside the Limit: "Good Time", released on 16 November 2018, "Fast Enough", released on 1 February 2019, and "Outside the Limit", released 28 August 2019. His latest studio album, Soul Letters, was released on 11 February 2022. Three singles were released accompanying the album: "Just for a Little While", on 10 September 2021, "At My Best", on 15 October 2021, and "Love Remedy", on 7 January 2022.

=== Additional work and performances ===
Børud has performed for Torun Eriksen and Sofian, and collaborated with Larvik Stroband and the Oslo Gospel Choir. He was a member of Oslo Kristne Senter for the releases Sangen Fra Våre Hjerter (1996) and Live Campmeeting 2 (1998), and he joined the choir Ungfila on the 2005 release Highest of High. In 2008, he collaborated with Kåre Conradi and Ingelin Reigstad Norheim along with girls from the Jeløy Church's Children's and Youth Choirs to release Takk, gode Gud, for alle ting: 20 sanger fra Barnesalmeboka, a compilation album of 20 hymns. The same year, he collaborated on another hymn compilation, Søndagsskolen Synger, with Ann Kristin Wenneberg, Marianne Bondevik, Hans Esben Gihle, and Voxkids. He appeared on the show Det store korslaget on Norway's TV 2 in 2010, and in the Eurovision Song Contest 2017, Børud sang in the backing chorus for Jowst's song "Grab the Moment". In 2018, he competed in Stjernekamp, during which he performed a duet with Lisa Børud. He was eliminated in the show's semi-finals. On 13 April 2020, Børud was featured along with Kine L. Fossheim on the single and music video "Together We Stand". The song was released by Gospel Explosion, a choral project led by Leif Ingvald Skaug. As a result of the COVID-19 pandemic, Skaug began holding online choir rehearsals, in which individuals from 70 different countries participated. Many of these choral members then collaborated long-distance to create the song.

Børud's career also includes session music and music production. In 2000, he played guitar and bass on the Frisk Luft album Lifetime Friends, on which he also was a technician. In 2009, he produced Vakkert!, an album by Askim Barnegospel. He provided guitar, arrangements, and programming for the 2010 release Mitt Valg by his niece Lisa Børud. The 2018 song "Chopin", by no:Hege Bjerk, was produced by Børud, and Børud also contributed backing vocals and vocal production to the subsequent 2020 release by Bjerk, Kan me stoppa tiå.

== Musical style and influences ==
Per Albrigtsen of Østlands-Posten called Børud one of the foremost artists in the funk and soul genres. From Shakin' the Ground onward, Børud adopted a Westcoast style that mixes together funk, r&b, and soul; Stepping Up is described as jazz pop in the vein of Steely Dan and Stevie Wonder. Outside the Limit was thought to hearken back to the 1970s and was compared to Chicago, Donald Fagen, Nikki Corvette, Al Jarreau, Phil Collins, Bruno Mars, Toto, and even Daft Punk. Other noted influences include Pages, Seawind, Gino Vannelli, Quincy Jones, George Duke, Earth, Wind and Fire, and Prince. Børud's brief foray into rap on the Arnold B Family album Livslyst was compared to Flava to da Bone.

Schaliach was described variously as doom metal, death metal, melodic death metal, death-doom, gothic metal, black metal, and progressive metal. The sole album from the band was noted for its "huge" sound, Metallica-influenced guitar style, and strong classical influences, which were likened to a "metal symphony". The band Extol, during Børud's tenure in the late-1990s and early 2000s, performed a highly technical mixture of death metal and progressive metal, incorporating other extreme metal styles as well as hardcore punk, orchestral music, jazz, and folk music. In reference to Extol, Børud stated in one interview that his influences "could be a lot. Anything from Death to Yes to Steely Dan to Jason Falkner and so forth." Similarly, the "thrashy death metal" of Death and 1970s prog of Yes were cited by Børud as influences for Fleshkiller.

== Discography ==
- Alle Skal Få Vite Det! (1988)
- Chi-Rho (2002)
- Shakin' the Ground (2008)
- Keep Movin (2011)
- Someday at Christmas with Samuel Ljungblahd (2012)
- Stepping Up (2014)
- Outside the Limit (2019)
- Soul Letters (2022)
- Sleepwalking Again (2025)

== Additional recording credits ==
The following is a list of recording credits and additional composition, vocal, and instrumental credits by Børud. The latter exclude performance credits as part of Børud's solo career or band memberships, which are included in their respective discography lists.

Work	Artist	Released	Credit
Fred	Ivar Skippervold	1983	Group backing vocals
Livslyst	Arnold B Family	1995	Producer
Sangen Fra Våre Hjerter	Oslo Kristne Senter	1996	Guitar, mixer
Krig	Mia	1997	Guitar, backing vocals, engineer
Burial	Extol	1998	Engineer
Solfa	Solfa	1998	Producer, engineer
Live Campmeeting 2	Oslo Kristne Senter	1998	Guitar, technician
Livet Er Her Og Nå	Kai Robert Johansen	1998	Guitar, backing vocals, engineer
Jesus Revolution	Stephan Christiansen	1998	Engineer, mixer
Hvil Deg	Britt Kvaran Elli	1999	Guitar, bass
The Gospel According To...	Stephen Ackles	1999	Electric and acoustic guitar, bass, percussion, backing vocals
Undeceived	Extol	2000	Producer, mixer
Ceylon Sailor	The Loch Ness Mouse	2000	Technician
Lifetime Friends	Frisk Luft	2000	Guitar, bass, technician
"All I Ask of Yo"	Vada	2000	Producer
Come to Me	Arnold B Family	2001	Guitar, bass on "Come to Me", mixer, arranger
"Human Frailtie's Grave"	Extol	2001	Producer
Chi Rho	Ole Børud	2002	Producer, recorder, mixer
Jesus Revolutionaries	Stephan Christiansen	2003	Producer, arranger, electric and acoustic guitar, bass
En Mektig Vind	Bjørn Aslaksen	2004	Electric and acoustic guitar
I'll Never Find Another You	Frisk Luft	2004	Guitar, bass, drums, keyboards, technician, and co-producer
Så Takknemlig	Lisa Børud	2004	Guitar
Prayers & Observations	Torun Eriksen	2005	Backing vocals
"Die a Little"	David Bakke	2005	Backing vocals
Elin Børud	Elin Børud	2005	Guitar, backing vocals
Hard as a Rock	The Schmucks	2005	Mixer
I Dag	Lisa Børud	2006	Guitar
Jesusfossen	Askim Barnegospel	2007	Guitar
Shakin' the Ground	Ole Børud	2008	Producer, mixer
Fri	Jon-Ragnar Grandahl	2008	Guitar, choir, technician, bass on "Ord"
Bli Med	Lisa Børud	2008	Guitar, backing vocals, programmer, arranger, music writer on "The Party"
Vakkert!	Askim Barnegospel	2009	Producer
Emmy & Ella	Emmy & Ella	2010	Arranger; guitar, bass, synthesizer on "Jag tror på Gud"
Mitt Valg	Lisa Børud	2010	Guitar, arranger, programmer
Keep Movin	Ole Børud	2011	Producer
"God Made Me Beautiful"	Emmy & Ella	2012	Music writer
"Barrytown"	Lars-Erik Dahle featuring Ole Børud	2013	Engineer
Extol	Extol	2013	Engineer, post-production
The Psalmist	Samuel Ljungblahd	2015	Backing vocals, vocal production
"Sommer'n Er Her"	Mathias & Pernille featuring Oliver	2016	Producer
"Barrytown [Waveform Five Mix]"	Lars-Erik Dahle featuring Ole Børud	2017	Engineer
Awaken	Fleshkiller	2017	Producer
"Chopin"	Hege Bjerk	2018	Producer
Witness	Samuel Ljungblahd	2019	Lead vocal producer
"Broken People"	Commandment 11	2020	Composer, lyricist
Kan me stoppa tiå	Hege Bjerk	2020	Vocals, vocal production, producer on "Chopin'"
"Come, Let Us Adore Him"	Redeemed	2020	Guitar
"Byen vår"	Amanda Rusti, Winona Løver, and Malekko	2021	Producer
"Angels"	Redeemed, Jens Andreas Kleiven	2021	Guitar
"Heaven is on My Side"	The Doodo	2022	Composer
"Kom Igjen"	Lisleby Barnesgospel	2022	Composer
Revisited Sessions	Ole Børud	2024	Producer
"High Life Dream"	Dane Donohue	2024	Rhythm and lead guitar, keyboards
"Lonely Day in Paradise"	Dane Donohue	2024	Lead guitar, keyboards
"Månestrålevakker"	Håkon Audun	2025	Producer
