= Jason Wisdom =

American musician (born 1983)

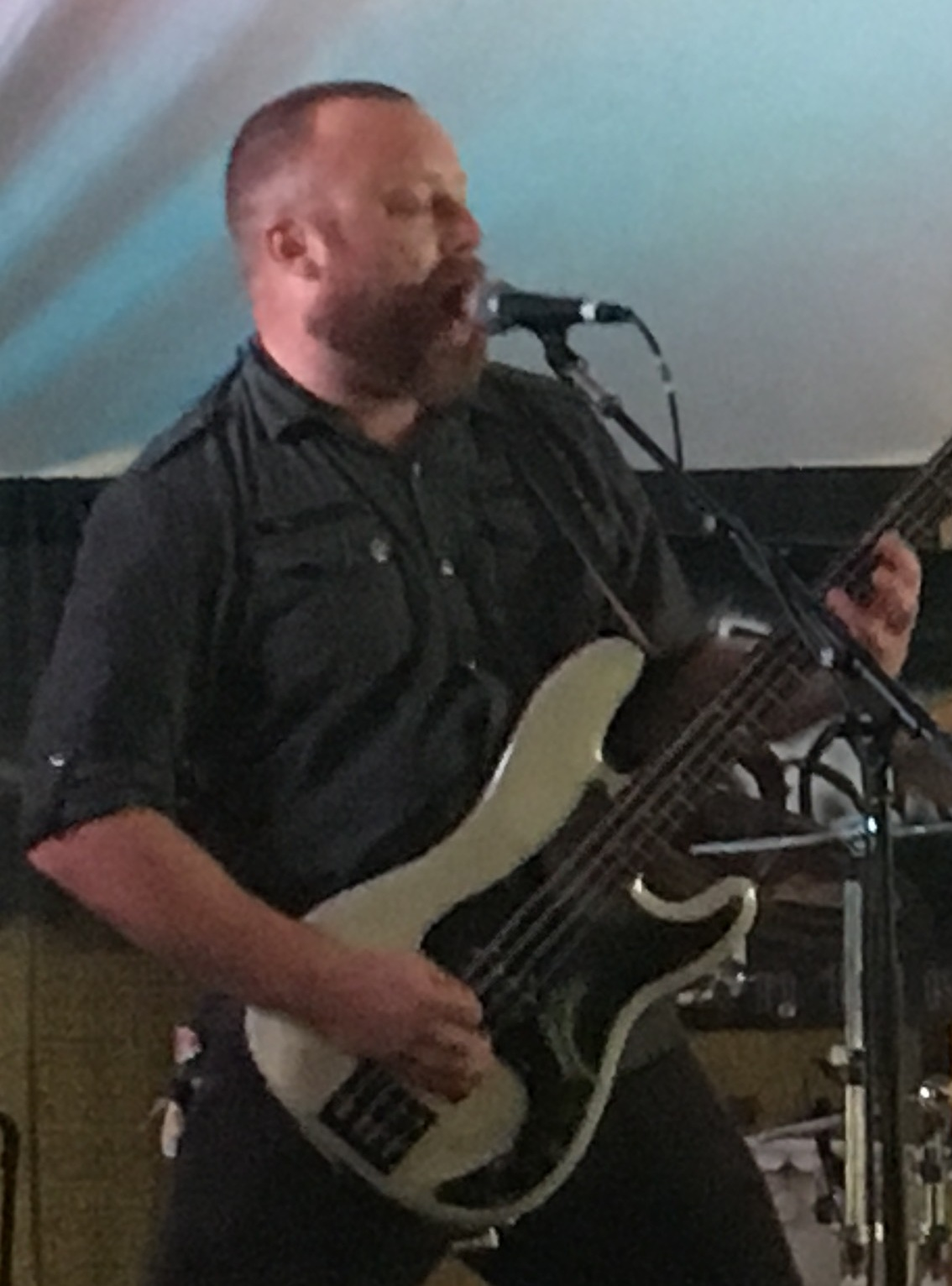
- Wisdom performing with Death Therapy in 2019

Background information
- Born: Jason Marshall Wisdom; November 25, 1983 (age 42)
- Origin: Dacula, Georgia, U.S.
- Genres: Christian metal; technical death metal; metalcore; progressive death metal; industrial metal
- Occupations: Singer; musician
- Instruments: Vocals; bass guitar
- Years active: 1999–present
- Member of: Death Therapy; The Reversalist; Becoming the Archetype
- Formerly of: Pneuma; Solamors

Jason Wisdom is an American musician who is the lead vocalist and bass guitarist for the heavy metal band Becoming the Archetype. Though he was born and raised in a Christian home, he states that he was never committed to Christianity until high school. He considers his music as a form of ministry, but wishes to avoid a "preachy" stereotype. His influences include Extol, Living Sacrifice, and Mortification among others. Wisdom notes that even though his music is Christian metal, many of his fans are not Christians and are many times the ones who defend his music. Wisdom left the band in late November 2011 to take care of his family (although he would return to the band in 2022). Though current 7 Horns 7 Eyes frontman, JJ Polachek, tried out, Wisdom was replaced by former live fill in, Chris McCane. He started a solo project titled Death Therapy, which features no guitars. He currently works for RYFO, a company that helps musicians with places to stay, meals and other such things.

== History ==
=== Becoming the Archetype (1999–2011, 2022–present) ===
Wisdom's musical career started in 1999, when he helped form Technical death metal band, Becoming the Archetype with guitarists Sean Cunningham and Jon Star, bassist Wes Gaither, and drummer Brent "Duck" Duckett. The band was not originally called Becoming the Archetype, as it was formerly called Nonexistent Failure. The band recorded a demo under this moniker, before changing the name again to The Remnant. The band recorded a demo and a their self titled album under this name. Around 2003-2004 the band played Cornerstone Festival, where they met the musicians in Demon Hunter. The members of DH told the members of the band to change their name, so they would not be confused with the punk band The Remnants. The band again changed their name to Becoming the Archetype. The band went over several line-up changes with the exception of Wisdom, Duck and founding BTA guitarist (who had nothing to do with Nonexistent Failure or The Remnant) Seth Hecox. The band recorded four albums, titled Terminate Damnation, The Physics of Fire, Dichotomy, and Celestial Completion, before Wisdom and Duck left the band, on November 14, 2011. In 2022, Wisdom revived BTA alongside Duck and Hecox, releasing a new album, Children of the Great Extinction, on August 26, 2022.

=== Solamors (2012–2015) ===
Beginning in 2012, Jason joined with guitarist Alex Kenis (Aletheian, ex-Becoming the Archetype) and drummer Travis Turner (ex-Aletheian, UnTeachers) to begin their band Solamors based in Philadelphia, Pennsylvania. The band's influences are Death, Emperor, Cynic, Becoming the Archetype, Aletheian, The Burial, Black Crown Initiate, Demon Hunter, Devin Townsend, Strapping Young Lad, Extol. Wisdom left the band in 2015.

=== Death Therapy (2015–present) ===
Death Therapy is Wisdom's solo project that was originally conceived in 2010, but started recording in 2015. He recorded a single titled "Possessed" and was released on November 9, 2015. Wisdom was planning on releasing an EP and touring in 2016. The project's influences are Tool, Opeth, and Devin Townsend. On October 30, 2016, Wisdom announced that Death Therapy had signed to Solid State Records and would be releasing a new album, by around February 2017. The band released two songs titled "Slow Dance (With Death)" and "Self Mind Dead" which features Andrew Schwab of Project 86. Death Therapy released their album The Storm Before the Calm on February 24, 2017. In 2019, Wisdom released Death Therapy's second album, Voices, on April 12. After releasing the EP Dance Therapy: Pre-apocalyptic Cyber Funk for Late Stage Humanoids in 2020, Death Therapy issued Melancholy Machines, their third studio album, on June 4, 2021.

== Bands ==
Current

- Death Therapy – vocals, bass (2015–present)
- The Reversalist - vocals (2020–present)
- Becoming the Archetype - vocals (1999-2011, 2022-present), bass (2003-2011, 2022-present)

Former

- Pneuma – vocals - (2011–2012)
- Solamors – vocals (2012–2015)
- Wisdom & Wages - Bass & Vocals (2021)

Timeline

== Discography ==
=== With Becoming the Archetype ===
==== As Nonexistent Failure ====
Demos

- In Loving Memory of Everything... I Never Had (2002)

==== As The Remnant ====
Demos

- Death, Destruction, and Mayhem (2003)

Studio albums

- The Remnant (2004, self-released)

==== As Becoming the Archetype ====
Studio albums

Year	Album	Label	Charts		
Year	Album	Label	US	US Heat	US Christ
2005	Terminate Damnation	Solid State Records	—	—	—
2007	The Physics of Fire	Solid State/Century Media	—	13	19
2008	Dichotomy	Solid State Records	—	19	41
2011	Celestial Completion	Solid State Records	—	7	18
2022	Children of the Great Extinction	Solid State Records	-	-	-

Singles

- "Necrotizing Fasciitis" (non-album digital single, 2009, Solid State)
- "O Holy Night" (non-album digital single, 2011, Solid State)

Music videos

- "Endure" (The Physics Of Fire) – 2007
- "The Magnetic Sky" (Celestial Completion) – 2011
- "Breathing Light" (Celestial Completion) – 2011

=== With Solamors ===
Studio albums

Year	Title	Label
2013	Depravity's Demise	Independent

=== With Death Therapy ===
EPs

- Demo Songs - 2015/2016 [Limited to 200 physical copies. Tracks listed in table below.]

#	Song	Length	Notes
1.	"The Lie"	4:46	
2.	"Possessed"	4:15	
3.	"Prodigal"	3:44	

Studio albums

- The Storm Before the Calm (2017)
- Voices (2019)
- Melancholy Machines (2021)

=== Guest appearances ===
- "Reject" by Living Sacrifice (2010; Live)
- "Nemesis" by Hope for the Dying (2016)
- "Burden" by Dire (2017)
- "A Deep State of Awake" by Teramaze (2020)
- "Black Hole" by TheLeadBassist (2022)
- "Ticket to the Next Apocalypse" by Teramaze (2022)
- "Spit Parade" by Mangled Carpenter (2023)
- "Break the Walls" by Motivik (2024)

=== Other work ===
- Beneath the Altar by The Final Witness (2025)
