= Dire =

Dire may refer to:

== Places ==
- Diré, a town in Tombouctou Region, Mali
- Diré Cercle, an administrative subdivision of Tombouctou Region, Mali
- Dire (Aanaa), a woreda in Oromia Region, Ethiopia

== People ==
- Dire Tladi (born 1975), South African law professor
- Dire Tune (born 1985), Ethiopian runner

== Other uses ==
- Dire (band), an American heavy metal band
- Dire, a team in the MOBA video game Dota 2
- Dire, a fictional character in the anime JoJo's Bizarre Adventure

== See also ==
- Dire Dawa (disambiguation)
- Dire Straits (disambiguation)
- Dire wolf (disambiguation)
