= Children of the Great Extinction =

Studio album by Becoming the Archetype
- Released: August 26, 2022
- Recorded: 2022
- Studio: Glow In The Dark Studios
- Genre: Progressive metal, melodic death metal, Christian metal
- Length: 49:06
- Label: Solid State
- Producer: Nate Washburn

Becoming the Archetype chronology
I Am (2012)	Children of the Great Extinction (2022)

Singles from Children of the Great Extinction
- 1. "The Lost Colony" Released: June 24, 2022; 2. "The Remnant" Released: July 15, 2022; 3. "The Calling" Released: August 5, 2022

Professional ratings
Review scores
Source	Rating
Jesus Freak Hideout	4.5/5 stars 5/5 stars
HM	4.5/5 stars
Metal Storm	7.4/10 stars

Children of the Great Extinction is the sixth studio album by American heavy metal band Becoming the Archetype. The album was released on August 26, 2022 through Solid State Records. It is the band's first album in ten years since their hiatus, and also features the return of Jason Wisdom and Brent "Duck" Duckett to the band with Seth Hecox, the first album to have this lineup since Celestial Completion. The album was produced by Nate Washburn (My Epic), and the album artwork was designed once again by Dan Seagrave, who had created the artworks for three of their albums.

== Background ==
In an interview with New Release Today, Wisdom said, "We talked about it a few years ago, right before COVID-19 happened. We talked about writing new music and then we got shut down for about a year and a half. Then, we met with our producer, Nate Washburn, and wrote some great new songs. The band hadn't been active for many years, but I think our reunion was mostly spurred on by the curiosity of wanting to try recording again. It's hard to write an album that'll live up to expectations after being gone for so many years, that's probably why I waited so long myself."

== Track listing ==
All lyrics are written by Jason Wisdom; all music is composed by Jason Wisdom, Seth Hecox, Brent Duckett and Nate Washburn.

No.	Title	Length
1.	"The Dead World"	4:49
2.	"The Lost Colony"	3:49
3.	"The Remnant"	4:48
4.	"The Calling"	4:59
5.	"The Phantom Field" (instrumental)	2:48
6.	"The Awakening"	6:15
7.	"The Hollow"	4:53
8.	"The Ruins" (featuring Ryan Clark of Demon Hunter)	3:58
9.	"The Curse"	4:12
10.	"The Sacrament"	8:35
Total length:		49:06

== Personnel ==
Becoming the Archetype

- Jason Wisdom – unclean vocals, bass, gang vocals
- Brent Duckett – drums, gang vocals
- Seth Hecox – guitar, keyboards, clean vocals

Additional Personnel

- Daniel Gailey (Phinehas, Fit for a King) – guitar and solo on "The Lost Colony"
- Alex Kenis (Aletheian, Solamors) – guitar and solo on "The Calling"
- Ryan Clark (Demon Hunter) – guest vocals on "The Ruins"
- Nate Washburn – production, mixing, engineering, guitar
- Troy Glessner – mastering
- Tyler Washburn – additional synths
- Jarret Chastain – gang vocals
- Samuel Holcomb – gang vocals
- Shaun Hughes – gang vocals
- Jim Hughes – layout
- Dan Seagrave – album artwork
