= Legacy (Hope for the Dying album) =

Studio album by Hope for the Dying
- Released: March 4, 2016
- Genre: Heavy metal; Christian metal; progressive metal; melodic metalcore; symphonic black metal
- Length: 59:30
- Label: Facedown
- Producer: Josh Barber and Jack Daniels

Hope for the Dying chronology
Aletheia (2013)	Legacy (2016)

Legacy is the third studio album by Hope for the Dying. Facedown Records released the album on March 4, 2016, as the band's third release with the label, with their first being Dissimulation, that released in 2011.

== Critical reception ==
Professional ratings
Review scores
Source	Rating
Jesus Freak Hideout	4.5/5 stars 3.5/5 stars 4/5 stars
Outburn	8/10

Rating the album an eight out of ten from Outburn, Nick DeMarino writes, "On their third album, Legacy Hope for the Dying remains uncompromising. The Illinois based Christian quintet plays an ambitious mix of blackened symphonic metal and tech savvy prog." Weaver states, "As a lover of metal who has become tired of the repeated sounds, Legacy offers something fresher. This one is well worth your while." Estabrooks writes, "It makes one wonder what could have been if the compelling metal bedrock of Legacy had been matched with the genuine folk musicianship it deserves." Barnes describes, "At every turn, the lure is compromise; Legacy does not offer any such concession. The newest effort from Hope For The Dying is excellent, building upon the band's previous accomplishments, especially in relation to song compensation and orchestral integration." Fryberger says, "Legacy will most likely go down as one of the best metal albums of 2016".

This is a heavy metal album described as Christian metal, progressive metal, symphonic black metal, and melodic metalcore, with elements of many genres such as folk metal, gothic metal, unblack metal, metalcore, technical death metal, melodic death metal, and symphonic metal.

== Track listing ==
No.	Title	Length
1.	"Aurora"	1:00
2.	"Setting Sun"	6:40
3.	"Flame Forged" (feat. Jon Wilson on Bass)	4:54
4.	"Narcissus"	6:34
5.	"Nemesis" (feat. Elisha Mullins of The Burial and Jason Wisdom of Becoming the Archetype and Solamors)	3:32
6.	"Trenches" (feat. "Shred" Sean Maier of Blessed by a Broken Heart on Guitar)	7:32
7.	"Wretched Curse" (feat. Shane Oscher of Hands and Everything in Slow Motion)	8:46
8.	"Wander No More"	4:43
9.	"Legacy"	9:16
10.	"Adamantine"	6:32
Total length:		59:30

== Chart performance ==
Chart (2016)	Peak position
US Christian Albums (Billboard)	50

== Credits ==
Hope for the Dying

- Josh Ditto – vocals, keyboards, photography
- James Houseman – guitar, orchestration, programming
- Jack Daniels – guitar, bass, producer, engineer
- Brendan Hengle – guitar, bass, drums

Additional musicians

- Jon Wilson – bass (3)
- Jason Wisdom – vocals (5)
- Elisha Mullins – guitar (5)
- "Shred" Sean Maier – guitar (6)
- Shane Ochsner – vocals (7)

Production

- Troy Glessner – mastering
- Josh Barber – producer, engineer
- Treena Ditto – photography
- Dave Quiggle – artwork
