= Depravity's Demise =

Studio album by Solamors
- Released: December 24, 2013
- Genres: Technical death metal, melodic death metal
- Length: 46:17
- Label: Independent
- Producers: Alex Kenis; Jason Wisdom; Jon Star

Professional ratings
Review scores
Source	Rating
HM Magazine	4/5 stars
Indie Vision Music	3/5 stars

Depravity's Demise is the debut of melodic death metal band Solamors. The band recorded the album with Jon Star, former Lead Guitarist for Becoming the Archetype, which Vocalist Jason Wisdom and Guitarist/Bassist/Keyboardist Alex Kenis were also a part of.

== Critical reception ==
Rob Houston of HM Magazine states:"If you are a fan of The Burial, Dream Theater, Animals As Leaders, Amon Amarth (or if you’re just missing Becoming the Archetype), you are going to be a very happy camper. This is a great end of the year release for the metal genre." Lee Brown of Indie Vision Music reports:"Although Becoming the Archetype have produced a pretty solid album with their new lead singer, there is something inside that just clamors for Jason Wisdom’s touch. If you feel that void in your life, Solamors is the answer. Composed of two of BTA’s former members (singer and guitarist), Solamors brings a sound that blends a heavy dose of Celestial Completion together with Dichotomy and just a dash of something closer to Demon Hunter’s style. It is a melodic death metal album that builds on the ethereal soundscapes and neo-gothical elements of Celestial while still beginning to forge a new path and identity for the band. Though the album does at times sound a little too close to what Kenis and Wisdom have since left behind, Depravity’s Demise is a great album with a great theological message that should bring new fans clamoring in and leave current fans grasping for more."

== Track listing ==
No.	Title	Length
1.	"Standing In Air"	4:11
2.	"Becoming What You Are"	3:21
3.	"Plotting In Vain"	3:50
4.	"Self Destructing"	4:32
5.	"Dum Vita Est Spes Est"	3:16
6.	"Dispelling Illusions"	3:55
7.	"Shouting In A Vacuum"	3:57
8.	"Following the Light"	3:50
9.	"Permeating Reality"	3:44
10.	"Instrumental"	8:11
11.	"Calling Down The Sky"	3:30
Total length:		46:17

== Personnel ==
Solamors

- Alex Kenis - Guitars, Bass, Keyboards, Producer, Mixer, Engineer
- Jason Wisdom - Vocals, Producer
- Travis Turner - Drums

Production

- Jon Star - Producer, Engineer
