= Death Therapy =

American Christian metal band

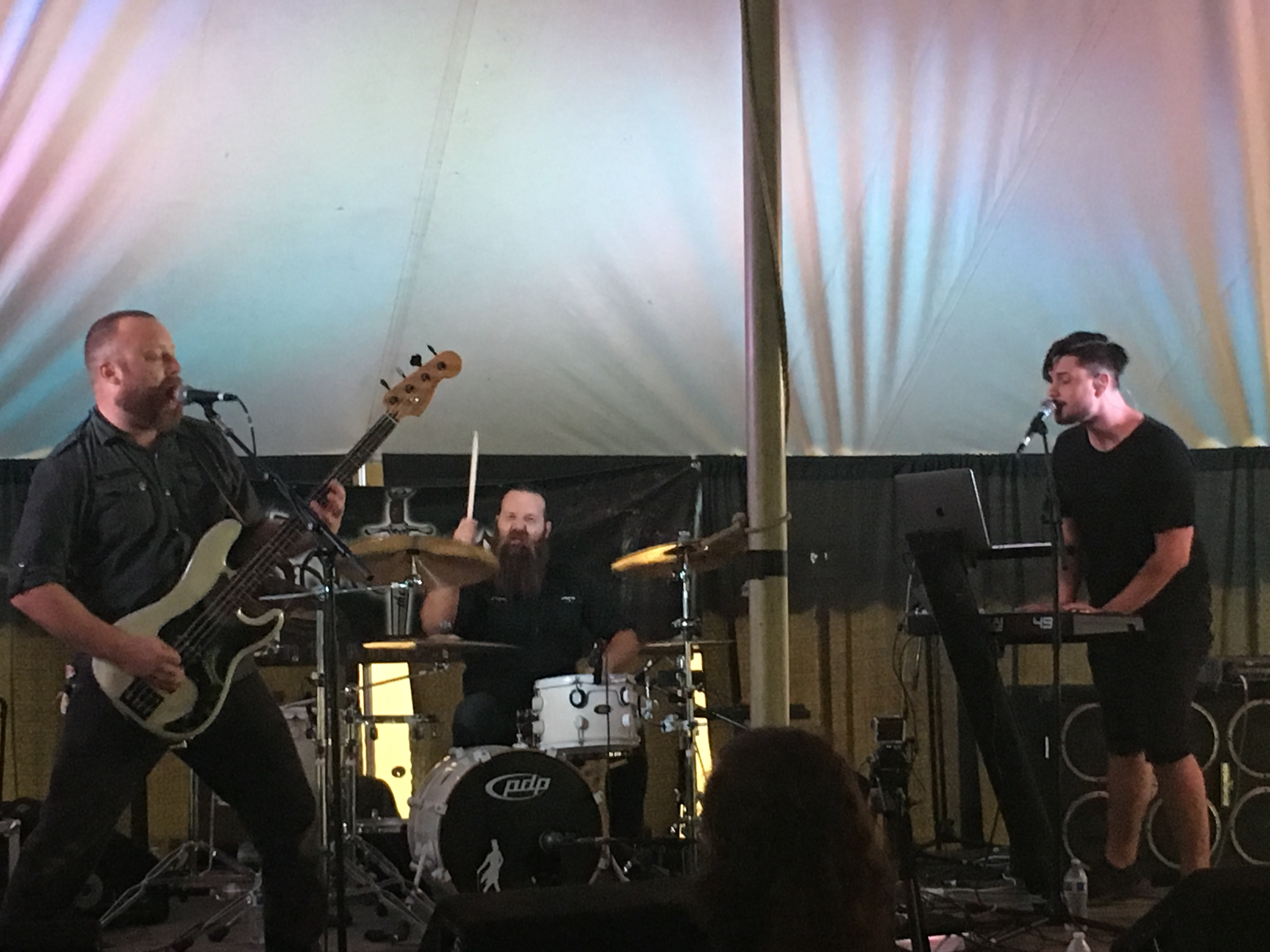
- Death Therapy at Audiofeed Festival 2019

Background information
- Origin: Atlanta, Georgia, U.S.
- Genres: Christian metal, industrial metal, groove metal
- Years active: 2015–present
- Label: Solid State Records
- Members: Jason Wisdom
- Website: Death Therapy on Facebook

Death Therapy is an American Christian metal band from Atlanta, Georgia. The project was formed in 2015 by Jason Wisdom, the bassist and vocalist of Becoming the Archetype. The band has since signed with Solid State Records and has released three albums, The Storm Before the Calm, Voices, and Melancholy Machines, and a demonstration recording. The band has described its sound as industrial groove metal.

== History ==
Death Therapy originated in November 2015 as a solo project in hopes to create a new outlet for Jason Wisdom to create music again. Wisdom previously had performed with Christian metal band Becoming the Archetype (BTA), as well as technical death metal project Solamors with former BTA and Aletheian members. The concept for the band began in 2010, but did not officially begin until 2015. Wisdom hired his friend Brian Wages to perform keyboards for the project, while the two programmed the drums on the band's first three songs - "Possessed", "The Lie", and "Prodigal" - which eventually came out as a demo, titled Demo Songs - 2015/2016, which was released independently on February 24, 2016. The band derived its name from the 1991 film 'What About Bob?'

On October 30, 2016, the band announced that it had signed with Solid State Records, which oddly enough the label did not announce until January 19, 2017. Following signing with the label, the band released two singles, "Self Mind Dead" and "Slow Dance (With Death)", to promote its upcoming album. The band released their debut, The Storm Before the Calm, through Solid State on February 24, 2017. The project toured around with several acts throughout 2017 and 2018. Death Therapy also released a cover, "Crazy" of Gnarls Barkley, as a stream. Following the cover's release, the band announced its sophomore album, Voices. Voices debuted through Solid State on April 12, 2019.

On July 10, 2020, Death Therapy released an independent album titled Dance Therapy: Pre-apocalyptic Cyber Funk for Late Stage Humanoids.

On September 25, 2020, Death Therapy and Solid State records released the new single "Reject", featuring guest vocals from Brook Reeves of Impending Doom, with the official music video premiering on YouTube on October 2. The song is a cover, originally released by Christian metal band Living Sacrifice in 1997.

== Members ==
Current

- Jason Wisdom – vocals, bass (2015–present)

Live and session

- Brian Wages – keyboards (2015–2016)
- Andrew Simmons – keyboards (2019–present)
- Josh Seagraves – drums (2016–present)
- Blake Aldrige – drums (2017–present)
- Josh Seehorn – drums (2019–present)

== Discography ==
Studio albums

- The Storm Before the Calm (February 24, 2017; Solid State)
- Voices (April 12, 2019; Solid State)
- Melancholy Machines (June 4, 2021; Tooth & Nail)

EPs

- Dance Therapy Part I: Pre-Apocalyptic Cyber Funk For Late Stage Humanoids (Independent) (2020)

Demos

- Demo Songs 2015/2016 (February 24, 2016; independent)

Singles

- "Possessed" (2015)
- "The Lie" (2015)
- "Self Mind Dead" (2017)
- "Slow Dance (With Death)" (2017)
- "Crazy" (2018)
- "My Defiance" (2019)
- "Feels Like Fiction" (2019)
- "It's Ok" (2019)
- "Reject" (2020)
