= Dying Vine =

Studio album by Aletheian
- Released: 2005
- Genre: Death metal, technical death metal
- Length: 36:50
- Label: Hope Prevails Productions

Aletheian chronology
Apolutrosis (2003)	Dying Vine (2005)

Professional ratings
Review scores
Source	Rating
AllMusic	3.5/5 stars

Dying Vine is a 2005 studio album by the band Aletheian. The band re-released the album in 2008 under their label, IronClad Records, a branch of Metal Blade Records. In 2015 the band re-released the album a third time for the original ten year anniversary on their Bandcamp page. The first re-release also featured a cover of the song "How Could I" by the band Cynic.

== Critical reception ==
Greg Pruto of AllMusic reports "A Christian progressive death metal band? Is there really such a thing? As evidenced by the sophomore release credited to Aletheian, Dying Vine, there sure is. The album was originally issued back in 2005 (after the group had issued several recordings under the Crutch moniker), but three years later it was reissued with the same exact track listing, in a remixed and remastered form (and with a new and improved front cover to boot!). From the aforementioned description, Dying Vine is an onslaught of metallic brutality, as the death metal guttural growls, razor-sharp high-tech riffs, and impeccable double bass drumming are seemingly nonstop. As with most death metal-esque bands, you'd never know what Aletheian have to say lyrically, as it's darn near impossible to decipher any of the prose without the aid of a lyric sheet (which, wisely, is included in the CD booklet). But despite the group's "Christian spin" on the genre, Aletheian sound like your average, ordinary death metal band, as evidenced by such ditties as "Paragon", "Out from the Shadows", and "The Dividing Line"."

John McEntire of HM Magazine writes "Since Alex Kenis joined Becoming the Archetype, Aletheian has been quick to quell any rumors about disbanding with performances, including this year’s Cornerstone, as well as a label deal and re-issue of 2005’s Dying Vine under Metal Blade’s Ironclad Recordings. Already a great album, Dying Vine sounds even better remixed and remastered by Westside Studios (Nile, Killswitch Engage, Between the Buried and Me). Also featuring a cover of Cynic’s "How Could I" and completely new artwork, this will appeal to old fans and newcomers alike. Making the most of their new connections, Aletheian is here to stay."

== Track listing ==
1. "The Paragon" - (4:37)
2. "Broken Legacy" - (3:18)
3. "Out of the Shadows" - (4:04)
4. "As the Fall Breaks" - (4:47)
5. "An Open Grave" - (4:08)
6. "The Shepard's Fold" - (3:10)
7. "The Dividing Line" - (3:05)
8. "Call to Arms" - (5:29)
9. "Burnt Offerings" - (4:20)

== Personnel ==
Aletheian

- Joel Thorpe - vocals, layout, design
- Alex Kenis - guitars, bass guitar, all production
- Joe Walmer - drums

Artwork

- Mike Dinunzio - artwork
