= The Physics of Fire =

Studio album by Becoming the Archetype
- Released: May 8, 2007
- Recorded: November 28, 2006–January 15, 2007
- Studio: Planet Red Studio, Richmond, Virginia
- Genre: Progressive death metal, metalcore
- Length: 50:57
- Label: Solid State, Century Media
- Producer: Andreas Magnusson

Becoming the Archetype chronology
Terminate Damnation (2005)	The Physics of Fire (2007)	Dichotomy (2008)

Alternative Cover
- Europe Cover

Professional ratings
Review scores
Source	Rating
Cross Rhythms	8/10 stars
Jesus Freak Hideout	5/5 stars
Pivotal Rage Webzine	4/5 stars
SonicFrontiers.net	not rated
Wise Men Promotions	4.5/5 stars

The Physics of Fire is the second studio album by American heavy metal band Becoming the Archetype. Released on May 8, 2007, the album shows the band shifting to a more progressive sound than on Terminate Damnation. This is also the first and only album featuring Aletheian guitarist Alex Kenis.

== Track listing ==
No.	Title	Length
1.	"Epoch of War (The Physics of Fire Pt. 3)"	3:14
2.	"Immolation"	5:27
3.	"Autopsy"	4:06
4.	"The Great Fall (The Physics of Fire Pt. 1)"	4:08
5.	"Nocturne" (instrumental)	3:17
6.	"The Monolith"	3:44
7.	"Construct and Collapse"	4:56
8.	"Endure"	2:48
9.	"Fire Made Flesh (The Physics of Fire Pt. 2)"	4:27
10.	"Second Death"	6:01
11.	"The Balance of Eternity (The Physics of Fire Pt. 4)"	8:49
Total length:		50:57

== Personnel ==
BTA

- Jason Wisdom – lead vocals, bass guitar
- Alex Kenis – guitar, backing vocals
- Count Seth Hecox – guitar, keyboards
- Brent Duckett – drums

Production

- Invisible Creature – art direction
- Andreas Magnusson – producer, engineering, mixing
- Chris Dowhan – engineering
- Troy Glessner – mastering
- David Stuart – photography
- Ryan Clark – design, artwork

== Reception ==
This album was well received by the Christian metal community and critics alike. Jesusfreakhideout.com gave it 5 stars out of 5, saying that "The Physics of Fire is among the most phenomenal records in its category and is destined to delight the ears of each metal listener captured."
