= Rhema (EP) =

EP by War of Ages
- Released: October 29, 2021
- Genre: Metalcore, Christian metal
- Length: 16:03
- Label: Facedown Records
- Producer: Jack Daniels

War of Ages chronology
| Void (2019) | Rhema (2021) | Dominion (2023) |

Rhema is the second EP by American Christian metal band War of Ages (the first recorded under that moniker, as the prior EP, Unite Us All, was created under the band’s former name Point Zero). It was released on October 29, 2021, and is the last recording released by the band while drummer Kaleb Leubchow was alive, as he died on July 29, 2022. The EP was produced by the band's guitarist, Jack Daniels.

Professional ratings
Review scores
| Source | Rating |
|---|---|
| Jesus Freak Hideout | 4/5 stars |
| Metal Trenches | 9/10 |

== Track listing ==
| No. | Title | Length |
|---|---|---|
| 1. | "Sleight of Hand" | 3:55 |
| 2. | "Pyrite" | 4:17 |
| 3. | "Unspoken" | 4:23 |
| 4. | "No Altars" | 3:29 |
| Total length: | | 16:03 |

== Personnel ==
Credits adapted from liner notes.

War of Ages

- Leroy Hamp – vocals
- Steve Brown – guitar
- Jack Daniels – guitar, production, engineering, mixing
- Elisha Mullins – bass, backing vocals
- Kaleb Leubchow – drums

Additional personnel

- John Dougless – mastering
- Justin Aufdemkampe – additional vocal tracking
