= Void (War of Ages album) =

Studio album by War of Ages
- Released: September 13, 2019
- Genre: Metalcore, Christian metal
- Length: 45:58
- Label: Facedown
- Producer: Jack Daniels

War of Ages chronology
Alpha (2017)	Void (2019)	Rhema (2021)

Singles from Void
- 1. "Sulphur and Salt" Released: May 31, 2019; 2. "Miles Apart" Released: July 10, 2019; 3. "Wrath" Released: July 26, 2019; 4. "Void" Released: August 23, 2019

Professional ratings
Review scores
Source	Rating
Jesus Freak Hideout	4.5/5 stars
HM Magazine	4/5 stars
Indie Vision	3/5 stars

Void is the eighth studio album by American Christian metal band War of Ages. It was released on September 13, 2019, and produced by the band's guitarist, Jack Daniels. It is the only studio album by the band to feature Kaleb Leubchow on drums while he was alive, as Leubchow died in 2022 following the release of the EP Rhema, and their 2023 release Dominion consists of posthumous recordings.

== Track listing ==
All lyrics are written by War of Ages; all music is composed by War of Ages.

Void track listing
No.	Title	Length
1.	"The Watchers"	4:38
2.	"Void"	3:19
3.	"Blood of the Earth"	3:33
4.	"Miles Apart"	4:12
5.	"Sulphur and Salt"	5:02
6.	"Greed"	3:33
7.	"Envy"	4:14
8.	"Wrath"	3:34
9.	"Jezebel"	4:36
10.	"Brotherhood"	4:56
11.	"The Return"	4:21
Total length:		45:58

== Personnel ==
Credits adapted from liner notes.

War of Ages

- Leroy Hamp – vocals
- Steve Brown – guitar
- Jack Daniels – guitar, production, mixing, engineering
- Kaleb Leubchow – drums
- Elisha Mullins – vocals, bass

Additional personnel

- Troy Glessner – mastering
- Coty Walker – editing
- Will Beaseley – editing
- Rick King – engineering
- Andy Cutrell – backing vocals
- Jacob Brand – programming
- Dave Quiggle – album artwork & design
- Jim Hughes – layout
