= The Tug Fork River Band =

American metal band

- Origin: Indianapolis, Indiana
- Genres: Christian metal, southern metal, groove metal
- Years active: 2006–2013
- Labels: Wounded Records
- Past members: Aaron Quinn; Justin Foxworth; Brian Dukes; David Leap; Derek Schweilbold
- Website: The Tug Fork River Band on Facebook

The Tug Fork River Band was a Southern groove metal band from Indianapolis, Indiana. The group formed in 2006, but disbanded in 2013.

== History ==
The band began in 2006 with the lineup of vocalist Aaron Quinn, guitarist Justin Foxworth, bassist Brian Dukes, and drummer David Leap. In 2007, the band released their debut EP independently, titled The Dirty Dirty. In May 2009, they released their debut album through Wounded Records, titled Catch for Us the Metal. The band was originally supposed to be a part of Dimebag Darrell (Pantera, Damageplan)'s tribute album. In 2011, Leap departed from the band and was replaced by Derek Schweilbold. In 2012, the band released Vulture independently. The EP was originally jokingly titled POOP-EP; Foxworth drew the album cover and the album was then titled Vulture. The band released a lyric video for "Ex Wives" off the EP, which received positive reviews. To support the EP, the band went on a mini-tour with Becoming the Archetype. In 2013, the band released their final EP, No Hope for Man, their best-known material. In 2017, the band re-released their debut EP, The Dirty Dirty, due to recent requests from their fans.

== Members ==
Last known lineup

- Aaron Quinn – vocals (2006–2013)
- Justin Foxworth – guitars (2006–2013)
- Brian Dukes – bass, backing vocals (2006–2013)
- Derek Schweilbold – drums (2011–2013)

Former members

- David Leap – drums (2006–2011)

== Discography ==
Studio albums

- Catch for Us the Metal (2009, Wounded Records)

EPs

- The Dirty Dirty (2007)
- Vulture (2012)
- No Hope for Man (2013)
