= Supreme Chaos =

Studio album by War of Ages
- Released: July 22, 2014
- Genre: Metalcore, Christian metal
- Length: 37:36
- Label: Facedown
- Producer: Joshua Barber

War of Ages chronology
Return to Life (2012)	Supreme Chaos (2014)	Alpha (2017)

Supreme Chaos is the sixth studio album by American Christian metal band War of Ages, released through Facedown Records July 22, 2014. War of Ages worked with Joshua Barber on the production of the album.

== Reception ==
Professional ratings
Review scores
Source	Rating
Cross Rhythms	8/10 squares
HM Magazine	4/5 stars
Indie Vision Music	4/5 stars
Jesus Freak Hideout	4.5/5 stars

Signaling in a four star review by HM Magazine, Reid Olson responds, "The guitar riffs rip, the drumming drives and altogether, Supreme Chaos causes barely controlled headbanging. A definite add to the War of Ages canon." Danny McMartin, indicating in an eight out of ten review from Cross Rhythms, regarding, "It is this deft approach which makes 'Supreme Chaos' such a pleasing effort." Specifying in a four and a half star review from Jesus Freak Hideout, Aaron Lambert replies, "Overall, War of Ages have unleashed a metal masterpiece with Supreme Chaos. There's no disputing that this is the best album they have ever written, and with the addition of the brilliant Jack Daniels to the already stellar lineup, this could mark the beginning of a new chapter for one of Christian metal's most gifted prodigies. Supreme Chaos comes highly recommended." Lee Brown writes in a four star review from Indie Vision Music, recognizing, "Though they are always one of the strongest bands out there, Supreme Chaos brings an even more polished and spiritually uplifting set of songs to War of Ages’ already impressive arsenal."

== Track listing ==
All tracks are written by War of Ages and Leroy Hamp.

No.	Title	Length
1.	"From Ashes"	3:29
2.	"Lost in Apathy"	3:58
3.	"Doomsday"	3:39
4.	"Chaos Theory"	3:49
5.	"Lionheart"	3:52
6.	"On Broken Wings"	3:54
7.	"Amber Alert"	3:16
8.	"Renegade"	3:14
9.	"Ecstasy"	4:11
10.	"Still Small Voice"	4:14
Total length:		37:36

== Personnel ==
War of Ages

- Leroy Hamp – vocals
- Steve Brown – guitar
- Jack Daniels – guitar, guitar engineer
- Ryan Tidwell – bass, clean vocals
- Alex Hamp – drums, percussion

Additional musicians

- Tyler Lyon – vocals
- Nick Marshall – vocals

Production

- Zach Alvey – assistant engineer
- Joshua Barber – engineer, producer
- McKinney Botts – assistant engineer
- Jason Dunn – A&R
- Will Putney – mastering, mixing
- Dave Quiggle – art direction, design, illustrations
- Ben "Bob" Turkovic – assistant engineer

== Charts ==
Chart (2014)	Peak position
US Billboard 200	107
US Christian Albums (Billboard)	5
US Top Hard Rock Albums (Billboard)	14
US Independent Albums (Billboard)	24
US Top Rock Albums (Billboard)	37
