= Alpha (War of Ages album) =

Studio album by War of Ages
- Released: December 8, 2017
- Studio: Refraze Recording Studios, Dayton, OH
- Genre: Metalcore, progressive metal, Christian metal
- Length: 40:36
- Label: Facedown
- Producer: Jason Suecof

War of Ages chronology
Supreme Chaos (2014)	Alpha (2017)	Void (2019)

Singles from Alpha
- 1. "Cut Throat" Released: October 12, 2017; 2. "Creator" Released: November 3, 2017; 3. "Buried Alive" Released: November 24, 2017

Alpha is the seventh studio album by American Christian metal band War of Ages. It was released on December 8, 2017, and was produced by Jason Suecof (August Burns Red, All That Remains, Trivium). It is the first release by the band to not include drummer Alex Hamp, as he had left the group and was replaced by Alex Rüdinger as session drummer. The album displays more of a progressive metal influence than previous releases.

Professional ratings
Review scores
Source	Rating
Jesus Freak Hideout	4/5 stars
Outburn Online	8/10 stars
Indie Vision	4/5 stars

== Track listing ==
All lyrics are written by Leroy Hamp; all music is composed by War of Ages.

No.	Title	Length
1.	"Creator"	3:56
2.	"Fullness"	4:10
3.	"Buried Alive"	3:39
4.	"Warpath"	4:10
5.	"Hollow Point"	4:20
6.	"Repentance"	4:02
7.	"Mind Control"	3:37
8.	"Immunity Revoked" (instrumental)	4:36
9.	"Warrior"	4:02
10.	"Cut Throat"	4:05
Total length:		40:36

== Personnel ==
Credits adapted from AllMusic.

War of Ages

- Leroy Hamp – vocals
- Steve Brown – rhythm guitar, lead guitar
- Jack Daniels – rhythm guitar, lead guitar, bass, engineering, production

Additional personnel

- Jason Suecof – production, mixing, engineering
- Alex Rüdinger – drums
- Ashley White – backing vocals on "Warrior"
- Justin Aufdemkampe – vocal engineering
- Dave Quiggle – album artwork & design
- John Dougless – engineering
- Mark Lewis – mastering
- Andy Cutrell – backing vocals
