= War of Ages (War of Ages album) =

2005 album by War of Ages

Studio album by War of Ages
- Released: July 12, 2005
- Recorded: March 2005
- Genres: Metalcore, Christian metal
- Length: 41:45
- Label: Strike First
- Producer: War of Ages

War of Ages chronology
Unite Us All (2004)	War of Ages (2005)	Pride of the Wicked (2006)

War of Ages is the debut studio album by American Christian metal band War of Ages. It was released on the 2005 on Strike First Records, a branch of Facedown Records.

The album was rated 2.5 out 5 stars by AllMusic.

== Track listing ==
No.	Title	Length
1.	"Intro"	0:14
2.	"Stand Your Ground"	4:47
3.	"Brothers in Arms"	3:58
4.	"False Prophet"	4:31
5.	"Only the Strong Survive"	3:57
6.	"My Solitude"	3:17
7.	"Battle On"	5:31
8.	"One Day"	4:33
9.	"Scars of Tomorrow"	3:18
10.	"Broken Before You"	3:51
11.	"Second Chance"	3:48
Total length:		41:45

== Fire from the Tomb ==
Fire from the Tomb

Studio album by War of Ages
- Released: July 24, 2007
- Recorded: January–April 2007
- Genres: Metalcore, Christian metal
- Length: 46:18
- Label: Facedown
- Producer: Tim Lambesis

War of Ages chronology
Pride of the Wicked (2006)	Fire from the Tomb (2007)	Arise and Conquer (2008)

Fire from the Tomb is a re-recording of War of Ages' self-titled debut album. It also has a new track, "The Awakening", that was later re-recorded in their next album Arise and Conquer. The album was released on July 24, 2007 on Facedown Records.

=== Track listing ===
No.	Title	Length
1.	"Intro"	1:33
2.	"Stand Your Ground"	3:51
3.	"Brothers in Arms"	4:13
4.	"The Awakening"	4:04
5.	"False Prophet"	4:38
6.	"Only the Strong Survive"	3:43
7.	"My Solitude"	3:35
8.	"Battle On"	5:39
9.	"One Day"	3:55
10.	"Scars of Tomorrow"	3:22
11.	"Broken Before You"	3:49
12.	"Second Chance"	3:51
Total length:		46:18

== Personnel ==
=== War of Ages ===
- Leroy Hamp – lead vocals
- Steve Brown – lead guitar, backing vocals
- Kang Garnic – rhythm guitar
- Nate Owensby – bass
- Rob Kerner – drums

=== Fire from the Tomb ===
- Leroy Hamp – lead vocals
- Steve Brown – lead guitar, backing vocals
- Jonathan Lynch – rhythm guitar, backing vocals
- T.J. Alford – bass guitar, backing vocals
- Alex Hamp – drums

=== Production ===
- Dave Quiggle – artwork on both releases
