= Bloodline Severed =

American Christian metal band

- Also known as: Markd (1998-2003), BS
- Origin: Charlotte and Winston-Salem, North Carolina, United States
- Genres: Christian metal Death Metal; Melodic death metal Metalcore; Djent; Thrash metal
- Years active: 1998–present
- Labels: Red Cord, Bombworks, Independent
- Members: Corey Weaver; Aaron Macemore; Daniel Macemore; Joey Cowan; David Whichard
- Past members: Joshua Lambeth; Nic Pugh; Dempsey Mills Jr. Stephen Horton; Derek Corzine; Amulyn Corzine; John Snyder
- Website: Bloodline Severed on Facebook

Bloodline Severed is a Christian metal band that originated in Charlotte and Winston-Salem, North Carolina. The band started in 1998, and has toured with acts such as Battlecross, Aletheian, Phinehas and many more. The band is independent with their own label named Don't Need One Records.

== History ==
Bloodline Severed started out as a band named Markd in 1998, with bassist David Wichard, vocalist Corey Weaver and two others. The band performed in a more Christian rock genre, similar to P.O.D. and Creed. The band went through some lineup changes and a name change, from Markd to Bloodline Severed. The name comes from Hebrews 9:22. By 2003, the band's lineup consisted of Wichard, Weaver, guitarists Joshua Lambeth and Dempsey Mills Jr., keyboardist Stephen Horton and drummer John Snyder.

In 2006, the band released their debut EP, titled Fear of Reality.

In 2007, the band saw some lineup changes including the departure of guitarists Nic Pugh and Dempsey Mills Jr. and the inclusion of Derek Corzine.

In 2008, the band released their debut album, titled Visions Revealed, which was re-released through Bombworks Records in 2009.

Guitarist Aaron Macemore and vocalist/keyboardist Amy Lynn Corzine joined the band in 2008. 2010 saw the departure of the Corzines. In 2011, Daniel, Aaron's brother, joined on as an additional guitarist.

In 2012, the band's sophomore album Letters to Decapolis was released through Red Cord Records.

Weaver departed from the band in 2012 for a brief time, being replaced by Jimmy Shaddix. Guitarist Joey Cowan was added to the lineup. Shaddix was in the band for seven months before Weaver returned.

The band released a single titled "Man of Sorrows" in 2014, and remained silent until 2016, when they released a second single titled "Fire."

The band announced the release of their newest album, Process of Progression, in March 2017, before its release in April.

In 2017, it was announced that founding drummer John Snyder had departed from the band.

The band later announced they were preparing to release new material, have a new lineup, and possibly embark on a new project.

== Members ==
Current

- Corey Weaver - vocals (1998–2012, 2013–present)
- David Wichard - bass, backing vocals (1998–present)
- Aaron Macemore - guitar (2009–present)
- Daniel Macemore - guitar (2011–present)
- Joey Cowan - guitar (2012–present)

Former

- Jimmy Shaddix - vocals (2012-2013)
- Joshua Lambeth - lead guitar, vocals (2010-2011)
- Nic Pugh - guitar (2006-2007)
- Dempsey Mills Jr. - rhythm guitar (2003-2007)
- Stephen Horton - keyboards, backing vocals
- Derek Corzine - guitar, backing vocals (2007-2010)
- Amy Lynn "Amulyn" Corzine - keyboards, vocals (2009-2010)
- John Snyder - drums (2003-2017)

Live

- Amy Lynn "Amulyn" Corzine - vocals (2008)
- Travis Shore - drums (2009)
- Derek Corzine - lead guitar, bass, backing vocals (2009-2014)

== Discography ==
Studio albums

- Visions Revealed (2008: self-released)
- Visions Revealed (2009: Bombworks Records)
- Letters to Decapolis (2012: Red Cord Records)
- Process of Progression (2017: self-released)

EPs

- Fear of Reality (2006: self-released)

Singles

- "Man of Sorrows" (2014)
- "Fire" (2016)

DVD

- Does God Really Care?

Compilation appearances

- Metal From The Dragon (Vol. 1) (2017; The Bearded Dragon Productions)
