= Return to Life (album) =

Studio album by War of Ages
- Released: April 24, 2012
- Genre: Metalcore, Christian metal
- Length: 36:15
- Label: Facedown
- Producer: Zeuss

War of Ages chronology
Eternal (2010)	Return to Life (2012)	Supreme Chaos (2014)

Return to Life is the fifth studio album by American Christian metal band War of Ages. Facedown Records released the album on April 24, 2012.

== Reception ==
Professional ratings
Review scores
Source	Rating
Cross Rhythms	8/10 squares
HM Magazine	4/5 stars
Indie Vision Music	3/5 stars
Jesus Freak Hideout	3/5 stars

Specifying in a four star review by HM Magazine, Taylor Rhea Smith recognizes, "With a noticeably richer, more melodic/ less hardcore sound, these are songs you’ll want to listen to over and over" Graeme Crawford, indicating in an eight out of ten review from Cross Rhythms, replying, "'Return To Life' may not be their best work, but it is also not a step backwards and is an uplifting album." Signaling in a three star review from Jesus Freak Hideout, Michael Weaver responds, "War of Ages' fifth studio album isn't bad; it's just typical metalcore with very, very little variation." Lee Brown, writes in a three star review from Indie Vision Music, realizing, "Return to Life doesn't break much new ground musically for fan-favorite War of Ages."

== Tracks ==
All tracks are written by War of Ages and Leroy Hamp.

No.	Title	Length
1.	"Immortal"	4:00
2.	"Redeemer"	4:08
3.	"Fallen Idol"	3:58
4.	"Silent Night"	4:19
5.	"M.E.B."	1:45
6.	"Song of Solomon"	3:29
7.	"With Honor"	4:08
8.	"Psalms"	3:50
9.	"Final Act"	3:27
10.	"Unite"	3:11
Total length:		36:15

== Personnel ==
War of Ages

- Leroy Hamp – vocals
- Steve Brown – lead guitar, bass
- Mark Randazzo – rhythm guitar, clean vocals
- Alex Hamp – drums, percussion

Production

- Zeuss – producer, engineering, mixing, mastering

== Charts ==
Chart (2012)	Peak position
US Billboard 200	155
US Christian Albums (Billboard)	8
US Top Hard Rock Albums (Billboard)	8
US Independent Albums (Billboard)	28
US Top Rock Albums (Billboard)	46
