= I Am (Becoming the Archetype album) =

Studio album by Becoming the Archetype
- Released: September 18, 2012
- Recorded: May 21 – June 17, 2012
- Genre: Metalcore, technical death metal
- Length: 37:12
- Label: Solid State
- Producer: Shane Frisby

Becoming the Archetype chronology
| Celestial Completion (2011) | I Am (2012) | Children of the Great Extinction (2022) |

Singles from I Am
- 1. "The Time Bender" Released: August 28, 2012

I Am is the fifth studio album by American heavy metal band Becoming the Archetype. The album was recorded between May 21 and June 17 and released on September 18, 2012 through Solid State Records. This album is a departure from the previous effort, as Seth Hecox says, "gone are the sitars and horns of Celestial Completion. Instead, we've crafted an album full of the heaviest and most technical songs we've ever written.” It is the first and only release by the band to feature Chris McCane on vocals, Codey Watkins on bass and Chris Heaton on drums. Guitarist/vocalist Seth Hecox was the only original member from the debut album featured on I Am. The first single to promote the album was the song "The Time Bender", released on August 28, 2012, as well a lyric video and an official video.

Professional ratings
Review scores
| Source | Rating |
|---|---|
| Metal Injection | 7.5/10 |
| About.com | 4/5 stars |
| The New Review | 4/5 stars |
| Jesus Freak Hideout | 3.5/5 stars |
| Indie Vision Music | 4/5 stars |

== Track listing ==
| No. | Title | Length |
|---|---|---|
| 1. | "The Ocean Walker" | 3:31 |
| 2. | "The Time Bender" | 3:23 |
| 3. | "The Eyes of the Storm" | 2:55 |
| 4. | "The Sky Bearer" | 3:51 |
| 5. | "The Machine Killer" (instrumental) | 2:08 |
| 6. | "The War Ender" | 4:24 |
| 7. | "The Weapon Breaker" | 4:43 |
| 8. | "The Planet Maker" | 3:16 |
| 9. | "The Sun Eater" | 3:16 |
| 10. | "I AM" | 5:45 |
| Total length: | | 37:12 |

== Personnel ==
Becoming the Archetype

- Chris McCane – Lead Vocals
- Daniel Gailey – Lead Guitars, Backing Vocals
- Seth Hecox – Rhythm Guitars, Keys, Clean Vocals
- Codey Watkins – Bass
- Chris Heaton – Drums

Production and Recording

- Shane Frisby – Producer
- Tue Madsen – Mixing
- Troy Glessnar – Mastering

Artwork and packaging

- Dan Seagrave – Cover Artwork & Additional Paintings

== Charts ==
| Chart (2012) | Peak position |
|---|---|
| US Christian Albums (Billboard) | 17 |
| US Heatseekers Albums (Billboard) | 16 |
| US Top Hard Rock Albums (Billboard) | 15 |
