= The Time Bender =

Single by Becoming the Archetype

from the album I Am
- Released: August 28, 2012
- Genre: Technical death metal
- Length: 3:23
- Label: Solid State
- Producer: Shane Frisby

Becoming the Archetype singles chronology
"O Holy Night" (2011)	"The Time Bender" (2012)

"The Time Bender" is the first single from the album I Am by American heavy metal band Becoming the Archetype. It was released on August 28, 2012, through Solid State. It was produced by Shane Frisby.

== Music video ==
The video was released on the band's channel and the record channel on YouTube. The video is filmed on film noir and makes references to Frank Miller's comic book Sin City and created by Miller himself, also contains dialogue as comic books, and the band looks for their instruments to keep playing, but are hidden in a castle.

== Personnel ==
Becoming the Archetype

- Chris McCane - lead vocals
- Daniel Gailey – lead guitar, vocals
- Seth Hecox – rhythm guitar, keyboards, clean vocals
- Codey Watkins – bass, vocals
- Chris Heaton – drums, percussion

Production and recording

- Shane Frisby - producer
- Tue Madsen - mixing
- Troy Glessnar - mastering
