= Pride of the Wicked =

Studio album by War of Ages
- Released: September 5, 2006
- Recorded: March–July 2006
- Genre: Metalcore, Christian metal
- Length: 41:07
- Label: Facedown

War of Ages chronology
War of Ages (2005)	Pride of the Wicked (2006)	Fire from the Tomb (2007)

Pride of the Wicked is the second studio album by American Christian metal band War of Ages. The album was released on September 5, 2006 on Facedown Records. It was the first album to feature T.J. Alford, formerly of Mortal Treason.

The album was rated 2.5 out of 5 stars by AllMusic.

== Track listing ==
No.	Title	Length
1.	"Guide for the Helpless"	4:27
2.	"Rise from the Ashes"	3:59
3.	"Strength Within"	3:49
4.	"Absence of Fear"	3:18
5.	"The Fall of Pride"	4:40
6.	"Heart of a Warrior"	3:52
7.	"Aftermath"	4:35
8.	"Bitter Sweet"	3:36
9.	"Silenced Insecurities"	3:52
10.	"Stone by Stone"	4:56
Total length:		41:07

== Personnel ==
=== War of Ages ===
- Leroy Hamp – lead vocals
- Steve Brown – lead guitar, backing vocals
- Jonathan Lynch – rhythm guitar, backing vocals
- T.J. Alford – bass guitar, backing vocals
- Alex Hamp – drums

=== Production ===
- Dave Quiggle - artwork
