= Shaped by Fate =

Welsh metalcore band

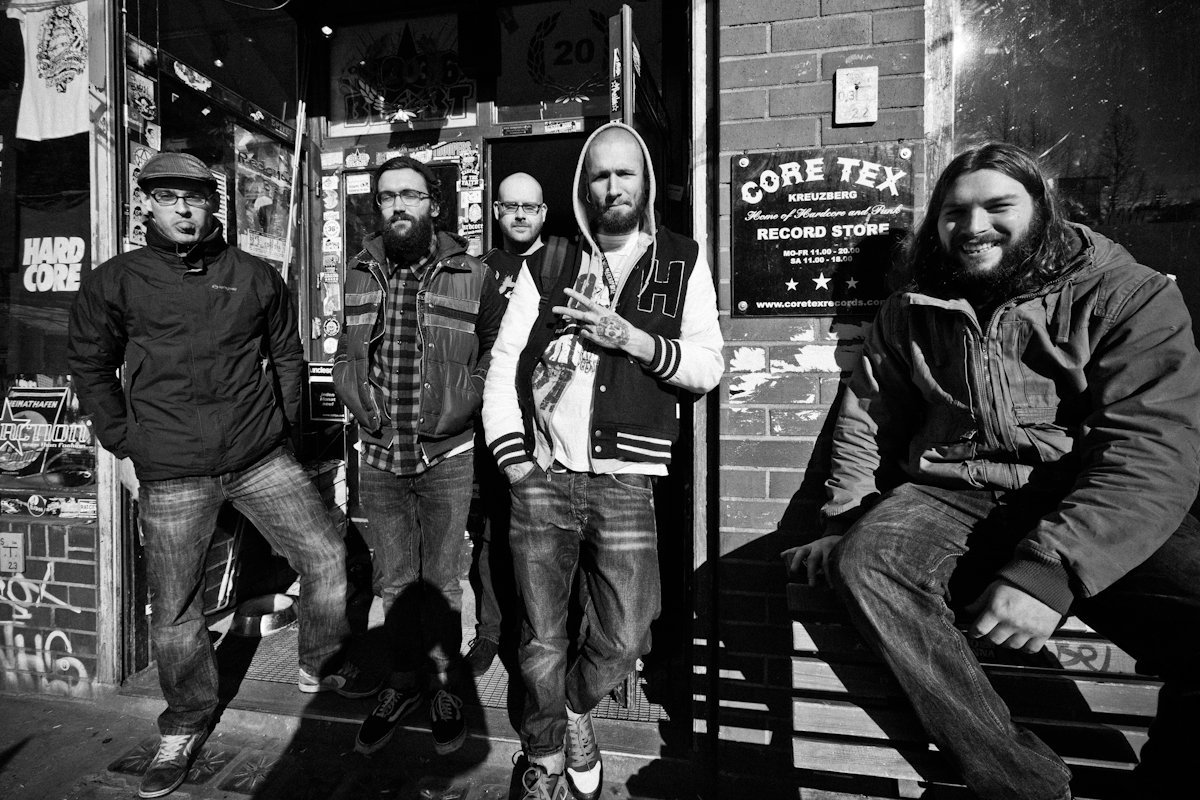
- Shaped By Fate in Berlin, Germany, 2011

Background information
- Origin: South Wales, UK
- Genres: Metalcore; mathcore; progressive metal
- Years active: 2001–2012
- Labels: Distort
- Members: Luke Grahame; Richey Beckett; Lee Jenkins; Paul Fortescue; Carl Richards
- Past members: Ben Duffin-Jones; Gareth Eveliegh; Nic Smalls; Owen Weeks; Jay Thurley

Shaped by Fate were a five-piece metalcore band from South Wales, UK. They were lauded as "the future of British Metalcore" by Kerrang! magazine which described the band's music as "some of the tastiest, heaviest, most shredding metal this island's seen in a long time".

== History ==
Shaped by Fate were originally influenced by the bands signed to Trustkill Records and featured on the DVD for Hellfest 2000.

Shaped by Fate toured across the UK and Europe with the likes of Parkway Drive, Suicide Silence, The Chariot, Every Time I Die, Becoming the Archetype, Bury Your Dead, Raging Speedhorn, Funeral for a Friend and Sikth.

After a series of EPs, Shaped by Fate released their debut album The Unbeliever in 2007 through In At The Deep End Records and digitally via Distort Entertainment. The album was recorded in Foel Studios, Wales, with Andrew Schneider.

The band released a limited edition DVD filmed during the Parkway Drive Tour at the end of 2008, entitled Riffage and Wreckage.

In early 2011 Shaped by Fate signed a deal with Siege of Amida Records to release their second album (four years in the making) entitled I Fear The World Has Changed.

== Members ==
=== Current members ===
- Paul Fortescue – vocals (2006–present)
- Luke Grahame – guitar (2001–present)
- Richey Beckett – guitar (2001–present)
- Lee Jenkins – bass (2001–present)
- Carl Richards – drums (2007–present)

=== Former members ===
- Ben Duffin-Jones – vocals (2001–2006)
- Gareth Eveliegh – drums (2001–2003)
- Nic Smalls – drums (2003)
- Owen Weeks – drums (2003–2005)
- Jay Thurley – drums (2005–2007)

== Discography ==
- Shaped By Fate (Demo 2002)
- The Fire Which In The Heart Resides (split EP, Mighty Atom Records, 2004)
- Brightest Lights Cast The Darkest Shadows (EP, Beniihana Records, 2005)
- The Unbeliever (LP, In At The Deep End Records, 2007)
- I Fear The World Has Changed (LP, Siege of Amida Records, 2012)

== Videos ==
- They Told Me You Were Dead (2008)
