= Arise and Conquer =

Arise & Conquer

Studio album by War of Ages
- Released: July 22, 2008
- Recorded: 2008
- Genre: Metalcore, Christian metal
- Length: 36:52
- Label: Facedown
- Producer: Tim Lambesis; Daniel Castleman

War of Ages chronology
Fire from the Tomb (2007)	Arise & Conquer (2008)	Eternal (2010)

Professional ratings
Review scores
Source	Rating
Decoy Music	3.5/5 stars

Arise & Conquer is the third studio album by American Christian metal band War of Ages. The album was released on July 22, 2008 by Facedown Records. The album was produced by Tim Lambesis of As I Lay Dying. The band has released a one-minute clip of "Sleep of Prisoners" on their MySpace, as well as the song "Through the Flames".

== Track listing ==
No.	Title	Length
1.	"All Consuming Fire"	4:14
2.	"When Faith Turns to Ashes"	1:52
3.	"Through the Flames"	4:18
4.	"Salvation"	3:29
5.	"Sleep of Prisoners"	4:00
6.	"Wages of Sin"	4:23
7.	"Yet Another Fallen Eve"	3:45
8.	"Generational Curse"	2:47
9.	"The Awakening"	3:59
10.	"The Deception of Strongholds"	4:06
Total length:		36:52

== Personnel ==
=== War of Ages ===
- Leroy Hamp – lead vocals
- Steve Brown – lead guitar, backing vocals
- Branon Bernatowicz – rhythm guitar, backing vocals
- T.J. Alford – bass guitar, backing vocals
- Alex Hamp – drums

=== Production ===
- Dave Quiggle - artwork
