= Aletheia (album) =

Studio album by Hope for the Dying
- Released: March 19, 2013
- Genre: Christian metal, technical metal
- Length: 62:43
- Label: Facedown
- Producer: Joshua Barber

Hope for the Dying chronology
Dissimulation (2011)	Aletheia (2013)	Legacy (2016)

Aletheia is the second studio album from Hope for the Dying. Facedown Records released the album on March 19, 2013. Hope for the Dying worked with Joshua Barber, in the production of this album.

== Critical reception ==
Professional ratings
Review scores
Source	Rating
Cross Rhythms	8/10 squares
HM Magazine	4/5 stars
Indie Vision Music	4/5 stars
Jesus Freak Hideout	3.5/5 stars 4/5 stars
Mind Equals Blown	8.0/10

Awarding the album four stars from HM Magazine, David Stagg states, it "is a grandiose, technical-metal effort that's truly indulgent." Ian Webber, rating the album an eight out of ten at Cross Rhythms, says, "this album is fast, furious and has enough about it to set it apart in an overpopulated hard music scene." Giving the album three and a half stars for Jesus Freak Hideout, Kevin Hoskins writes, "Aletheia will be an album to be sought after by most of the hardcore scene." Michael Weaver, awarding the album four stars by Jesus Freak Hideout, describes, "it is over one hour of musical brilliance." Rating the album an eight out of ten for Mind Equals Blown, Tim Dodderidge writes, "Aletheia is an example-setter for other current metal bands on how to do metal right." Lee Brown, giving the album four stars from Indie Vision Music, states, "Aletheia is not your typical metal release… it is so much better than that."

== Track listing ==
All tracks are written by Jack Daniels, Josh Ditto, Hope for the Dying on all tracks except No. 8 that was by Daniels and Hope for the Dying

No.	Title	Length
1.	"Acceptance"	9:43
2.	"Reformation"	4:17
3.	"Iniquitous"	5:20
4.	"In Isolation"	8:10
5.	"Through a Nightmare, Darkly"	5:11
6.	"The Lost"	5:30
7.	"Visions"	9:53
8.	"Serenity"	1:58
9.	"Open Up the Sky"	12:41
Total length:		62:43

== Personnel ==
Hope for the Dying

- Josh Ditto – vocals, keyboards
- James Houseman – guitar, backing vocals
- Jack Daniels – guitar
- Brendan Hengle – drums, bass
