= Eternal (War of Ages album) =

Studio album by War of Ages
- Released: April 13, 2010
- Genres: Metalcore, Christian metal
- Length: 35:44
- Label: Facedown
- Producers: Tim Lambesis, Daniel Castleman

War of Ages chronology
Arise & Conquer (2008)	Eternal (2010)	Return to Life (2012)

Professional ratings
Review scores
Source	Rating
AllMusic	3.5/5 stars
DecoyMusic	2/5 stars
JesusfreakHideout	4/5 stars

Eternal is the fourth studio album by American Christian metal band War of Ages. The album was released in the United States on April 13, 2010. It is the last album by the band to feature rhythm guitarist Branon Bernatowicz, and bassist T.J. Alford. A re-recorded, remixed and remastered 15th anniversary edition of the album was released on June 13, 2025.

== Background ==
In March 2010 War of Ages shared a tentative release date of April 13 for the record. A music video for the track "Collapse" was released in May 2010.

== Track listing ==
No.	Title	Length
1.	"Collapse"	4:05
2.	"Desire" (featuring Tim Lambesis of As I Lay Dying̽)	2:55
3.	"Failure"	4:31
4.	"My Resting Place"	3:04
5.	"Eternal" (featuring Sonny Sandoval of P.O.D.)	3:30
6.	"Indecision"	3:33
7.	"Lack of Clarity" (featuring Josh Gilbert of As I Lay Dying)	3:49
8.	"The Fallen"	3:38
9.	"Your Betrayal"	2:56
10.	"Instrumental"	3:49
Total length:		35:44

15th anniversary edition bonus track
No.	Title	Length
11.	"Prevail"	3:41

̽ 15th anniversary edition of "Desire" removes Lambesis' vocal track.

== Personnel ==
=== 2010 edition personnel ===
War of Ages

- Leroy Hamp – lead vocals
- Steve Brown – lead guitar, backing vocals
- Branon Bernatowicz – rhythm guitar, backing vocals
- T.J. Alford – bass, backing vocals
- Alex Hamp – drums

Guest musicians

- Tim Lambesis (As I Lay Dying, Austrian Death Machine) – vocals on track 2
- Sonny Sandoval (P.O.D.) – vocals on track 5
- Josh Gilbert (As I Lay Dying) – vocals on track 7

Production

- Tim Lambesis – production
- Daniel Castleman – engineering
- Kelly Cairns – engineering
- Troy Glessner – mastering

=== 15th anniversary edition personnel ===
War of Ages

- Leroy Hamp – lead vocals
- Steve Brown – lead guitar, backing vocals
- Jack Daniels – rhythm guitar, production, engineering, mixing
- Elisha Mullins – bass, backing vocals, production, engineering, mastering
