= Apolutrosis (album) =

Studio album by Aletheian
- Released: 2003
- Genres: Christian metal, technical death metal
- Length: 34:59
- Label: Hope Prevails

Aletheian chronology
| Hope Prevails (2001) | Apolutrosis (2003) | Dying Vine (2005) |

Professional ratings
Review scores
| Source | Rating |
|---|---|
| The Phantom Tollbooth | 5/5 stars |
| The Whipping Post | 84/100 |

Apolutrosis is the debut album by Aletheian, in 2003. The band was originally known as Crutch.

== Critical reception ==
The website Metal Maniacs (June 2004) wrote "While some of the guitar parts sound a little rusty and slightly off-key in spots, the acoustics, overall presentation, clean-to-harsh vocal jumps and progressive songwriting make this outing a keeper. Fans of Control Denied, Sceptic, Cynic and Nightwish should find haven in this one." "By combining their strong command of expression and composition with exceptional musicianship, Aletheian have set a new standard for progressive Death Metal." writes Smother.net Norwegian SCREAM Magazine (November 2003) wrote "The band seems a little drowsy in these parts, and the progrock sounding parts are dragged out a bit too much, before new musical faces appear." Matt Morrow of The Whipping Post reports "Aletheian has dared to step out on a limb with this technical and progressive slab of metal. In this reviewer's opinion, it was a risk worth taking and was nicely executed." Black-Cauldron.com stated "This CD stayed in this reviewer's player for 2 days straight at one point. The more I listened to it, the more it grew on me. If you like your metal extreme and fast with little regard for technicality, you probably won't like this CD. If you hate extreme metal to intermix strings, piano and clean vocals, then this isn't for you. But if you like your music not to follow a predictable formula, and you are a fan of the various musical styles mentioned throughout this review, or if you just like to hear something different from the norm, then you should check this CD out. The production is quite good, the instruments are played with technical precision and prowess, the songs are highly creative and extremely enjoyable to listen to, and the last song left me eager for more. I would highly recommend this disc and sincerely hope that this isn't all Aletheian has to offer." Finally, Len Nash of The Phantom Tollbooth wrote "Crutch is now a good place to start to find some good American bands that play good Euro Metal. Plus, there is a nice layout for the CD booklet artwork."

== Track listing ==
| No. | Title | Length |
|---|---|---|
| 1. | "Prelude" | 3:04 |
| 2. | "Hamartia" | 5:07 |
| 3. | "Exaleiphein - Movement 1" | 1:57 |
| 4. | "Movement 2" | 4:40 |
| 5. | "Splagchna" | 4:09 |
| 6. | "Xenos - Movement 1" | 5:46 |
| 7. | "Movement 2" | 6:43 |
| 8. | "Benediction" | 8:33 |
| Total length: | | 39:59 |

== Personnel ==
Aletheian

- Joel Thorpe - vocals, artwork, lyrics
- Alex Kenis - lead guitars, bass, keyboards, samples, clean vocals, producer, mixing, mastering, song-writing
- Donny Swigart - rhythm guitar
- Travis Turner - drums

Additional musicians

- Natalie Kenis - vocals
- Josiah "Joe" Walmer - drums

Production

- Travis Wagner - artwork
- Hannah - photography
