= Dichotomy (album) =

Studio album by Becoming the Archetype
- Released: November 24, 2008
- Recorded: July–September 2008
- Genre: Progressive death metal
- Length: 43:31
- Label: Solid State
- Producer: Devin Townsend

Becoming the Archetype chronology
| The Physics of Fire (2007) | Dichotomy (2008) | Celestial Completion (2011) |

Professional ratings
Review scores
| Source | Rating |
|---|---|
| Indie Vision Music | 8.5/10 link |
| Jesus Freak Hideout | link |

Dichotomy is the third studio album by American heavy metal band Becoming the Archetype, released on November 24, 2008. The album features guest appearances by Devin Townsend, Ryan Clark, a soprano named Suzanne Richter, and Aslan.

The album is based heavily on C.S. Lewis' Space Trilogy.

== Track listing ==
| No. | Title | Length |
|---|---|---|
| 1. | "Mountain of Souls (The Ghost)" (featuring Devin Townsend of Strapping Young Lad) | 5:16 |
| 2. | "Dichotomy (The Tower)" (featuring Ryan Clark of Demon Hunter) | 4:25 |
| 3. | "Artificial Immortality (The Beast)" | 3:58 |
| 4. | "Self Existent (The Tomb)" | 4:18 |
| 5. | "St. Anne's Lullaby (The Sage)" (instrumental) | 1:53 |
| 6. | "Ransom (The Serpent)" | 4:04 |
| 7. | "Evil Unseen (The Root)" | 4:04 |
| 8. | "How Great Thou Art (The Hymn)" | 4:29 |
| 9. | "Deep Heaven (The Awakening)" | 4:38 |
| 10. | "End of the Age (The Lion)" | 6:30 |
| Total length: | | 43:31 |

The band posted full album lyrics on their MySpace blog on September 11, 2008.

== Personnel ==
Becoming the Archetype

- Jason Wisdom - vocals, bass
- Count Seth Hecox - guitars, keyboards, backing vocals
- Jon Star - guitars
- Brandon Lopez - drums, percussion

Additional Musicians

- Suzanne Richter - guest vocals on track 9
- Ryan Clark (Demon Hunter) - guest vocals on track 2
- Devin Townsend (Strapping Young Lad) - guest vocals on track 1
