= Dire Dawa (disambiguation) =

Dire Dawa is a city in Ethiopia.

Dire Dawa may also refer to:

- Dire Dawa Airport
- Dire Dawa City S.C., a football club
- Dire Dawa Stadium
- Dire Dawa University
