= UnTeachers =

American heavy metal band

Unteachers
- Origin: Lancaster, Pennsylvania
- Genres: Punk rock; Christian punk; Christian metal; art metal; noise rock; sludge metal
- Years active: 2006–present
- Labels: Veritas Vinyl, Rottweiler Records
- Spinoff of: Tantrum of the Muse
- Members: Stephen Mark Sarro; Rick Wise
- Past members: Seth Luzier; Brian Denny; Thom Lambert; Travis Turner; Joshua Kale; Keith Scotten
- Website: UnTeachers on Facebook

UnTeachers is a heavy metal band from Lancaster, Pennsylvania, United States. The band has released a split EP with Grace & Thieves, and a full-length album, titled, A Human Comedy which debuted No. 10 on Seth Werkheiser's Top 10 of 2014.

== History ==
Formed in 2007, Unteachers is the musical brainchild of Stephen Mark Sarro (Tantrum Of The Muse) The first official line-up consisted of bassist Brian Denny, drummer Thom Lambert (Good Clean Fun), and keyboardist Seth Luzier. The band recorded an EP of Tantrum Of The Muse reworked songs, and a demo for the new Unteachers material with this line up.

In 2009 Stephen was briefly joined by Rick Wise (Tantrum Of The Muse) and together they recorded Fill This Place With Blood and Fear Of Silence for a 7-inch.

Soon after recording the 2 songs, Rick left the band.

Travis Turner, (Aletheian and Solamors) joined in 2009. The duo recorded drums for the split 7-inch with Grace & Thieves, which was released via Veritas Vinyl.

In 2012, bassist Josh Kale joined the band. Between 2012 - 2014 the band recorded the first full-length album.

In 2014, the band released A Human Comedy shortly after the release of the album, this line up was disbanded.

In 2017 Rick Wise joined the band again, in addition to Keith Scotten (bass) but this was shortly lived, due to Keith's unavailability to be in the band.

2021, Stephen and Rick recorded an EP split for Love Your Enemies Records, with Manta Birostris. The songs included are "A Spectre In The Nous" which is the first new song from the band since 2014. Additionally the band recorded a cover of a 90s band called 274, titled "If You Think".

The EP was released in 2022.

Currently (2022) the band is set to record the 2nd full-length album.

== Members ==
Current

- Stephen Mark Sarro - vocals, guitar (formerly of Tantrum of the Muse) (2006–present)
- Rick Wise - drums, percussion (formerly of Tantrum of the Muse, formerly of The Huntingtons) (2007, 2016–present)

Former

- Clifton Travis Turner - drums (formerly of Aletheian, Solamors) (2010-2016)
- Brian Denny - bass (2011-2013)
- Joshua Kale - bass (formerly of My Brother the Woodmaker) (2010-2016)
- Keith Scotten - bass (The Cancerous Reagans, Ten Thousand Bullets) (2016-2020)
- Seth Luzier - keyboards, piano (formerly of Tantrum of the Muse) (2006-2007)
- Thom Lambert - drums (formerly of Good Clean Fun) (2006-2007)

Timeline

== Discography ==
Studio albums

- A Human Comedy (November 1, 2014, Veritas Vinyl)

EPs

- UnTeachers/Grace & Thieves (July 10, 2012, Veritas Vinyl; Split with Grace & Thieves)
- Untantrum EP (January 1, 2007)

Compilation appearances

- Metal From The Dragon (Vol. 1) (June 23, 2017; The Bearded Dragon Productions)
