= Dire Straits (disambiguation) =

Dire Straits were a British rock band.

Dire Straits may also refer to:

- Dire Straits (album), the band's 1978 debut album
- Dire Straits Tour, the band's 1978 debut tour

== See also ==
- The Three Weeks, or Bein haMetzarim (Between the Straits), a period of mourning commemorating the destruction of the first and second Jewish Temples
