= Dissimulation (Hope for the Dying album) =

Studio album by Hope for the Dying
- Released: April 26, 2011
- Genre: Christian metal, progressive metal
- Length: 53:59
- Label: Facedown
- Producer: Brian Hood

Hope for the Dying chronology
Hope for the Dying EP (2008)	Dissimulation (2011)	Aletheia (2013)

Dissimulation is the debut studio album by Hope for the Dying. Facedown Records released the album on April 26, 2011.

== Critical reception ==
Professional ratings
Review scores
Source	Rating
Cross Rhythms	9/10 squares
HM Magazine	4.5/5 stars
Indie Vision Music	3/5 stars
Jesus Freak Hideout	4.5/5 stars 4/5 stars

Awarding the album four and a half stars from HM Magazine, Rob Shameless states, "It is clean. It is heavy. It is good metal." Graeme Crawford, rating the album a nine out of ten at Cross Rhythms, describes, "Dark, brooding and highly intense, the second album from Jonesboro, Illinois' Hope For The Dying is a stunning work of progressive, technical metal. Elements of thrash, death, black and '80s heavy metal are combined with classical sections and a progressive mentality to deliver an intricate, thought provoking yet very heavy album." Giving the album four and a half stars for Jesus Freak Hideout, Michael Weaver writes, "Dissimulation is one of the best metal albums to come around in a while." Wayne Reimer, awarding the album four stars by Jesus Freak Hideout, says, "There's a whole lot happening in Dissimulation, but they pull off everything they attempt."

== Track listing ==
All tracks are written by James Houseman on all tracks but No. 4 was co-written with Jack Daniels

No.	Title	Length
1.	"Exordium"	2:29
2.	"Vacillation"	4:09
3.	"Orison"	3:29
4.	"Transcend"	7:20
5.	"Imminent War"	5:17
6.	"Perpetual Ruin"	4:39
7.	"The Awakening"	7:26
8.	"The Awakening: Dissimulation"	4:43
9.	"The Awakening: The Veil Lifted"	2:29
10.	"Vile Reflections"	4:52
11.	"Derision"	7:06
Total length:		53:59

== Personnel ==
Hope for the Dying

- Josh Ditto – vocals, keyboards
- James Houseman – guitar, backing vocals
- Jack Daniels – guitar
- Brendan Hengle – drums, bass
