= Hope for the Dying =

American Christian metal band

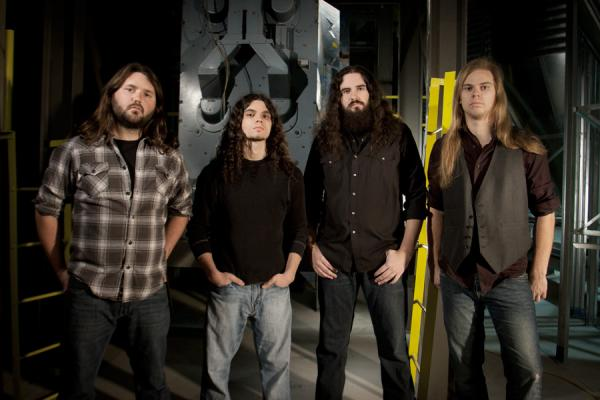
- Hope for the Dying- Josh Ditto, Brendan Hengle, James Houseman, Jack Daniels

Background information
- Origin: Jonesboro, Illinois, U.S.
- Genres: Christian metal, progressive death metal
- Years active: 2006–present
- Label: Facedown
- Members: Josh Ditto; James Houseman; Jack Daniels; Brendan Hengle

Hope for the Dying also known as HFTD is an American Christian progressive metal band from Jonesboro, Illinois, United States.

== History ==
The band formed in 2006 and released a self-titled EP in April 2008, which was later repackaged as an album and released via Strike First Records, an imprint label of Facedown Records, on November 25, 2008. With that, Hope for the Dying became the first band with an album released on the relaunched label. Before its retirement in 2006, Strike First Records had signed bands like War of Ages.

They toured as part of Facedown Fest 2009 in April 2009 and have also toured independently.

The group's official debut album, Dissimulation, was released in April 2011 by Facedown Records.

The Christian faith has a profound influence in the lyrics and motivation of the band.

In 2013 the band has announced on their Facebook page that they will release a new album called Aletheia on March 19 on Facedown Records.

Legacy was released on March 4, 2016, by Facedown Records.

== Discography ==
Date of release	Title	Label
April 29, 2008	Hope for the Dying (EP)	Drop Something
April 26, 2011	Dissimulation	Facedown Records
March 19, 2013	Aletheia	Facedown Records
March 4, 2016	Legacy	Facedown Records

== Members ==
Current members

- Josh Ditto – lead vocals, keyboards (2006–present)
- James Houseman – lead guitar, backup vocals (2006–present)
- Jack Daniels – rhythm guitar, bass, backup vocals (2006–present)
- Brendan Hengle – drums, bass, guitars (May 2010 – 2013, 2014–present)

Former members

- James Red Cloud – bass (2006–2007, 2008)
- Brice Voyles – drums (2006–2009)
- Zach Gowen – bass (2008)
- Jacob Capps – bass (2008–September 2009)
- Jesse Fleming – drums (2009–January 2010)
- Ryan Dillon – bass (September 2009 – March 2010)
- E.J. Sugars – drums (January–March 2010)
- Chris Owens – bass (May 2010–September 2010)

Session musicians

- Kaleb Luebchow (May 2013–2014) (deceased 2022)

Timeline
