= Dire (band) =

American metal band

- Origin: Georgia, U.S.
- Genres: Metalcore; groove metal
- Years active: 2010–present
- Labels: Independent, Sancrosanct
- Members: Joran Messer; Nick McLendon; Trey Hutchinson; Caleb Barnes
- Past members: Brandon Wade; Victoria Messer; Kyle Robinson
- Website: direband.com

Dire is an American metalcore band from Quitman, Georgia.

== History ==
The band began in 2010 with Joran Messer (vocals, lead guitars) and Brandon Wade (bass) and Kyle Robinson (rhythm guitars). The band recorded their self-titled debut EP in 2013, independently. After releasing the EP, the band began writing on their debut album, Volume 1. In 2015, the band went to Nashville, Tennessee to begin recording their album with Jeremiah Scott (Demon Hunter, Living Sacrifice). The next year, the once again went to finish the album with Lee Dyess (In Due Time) at EarthSound Studios. The album was finally released in late 2016, but before its release, rhythm guitarist Kyle Robinson departed from the band. After the release, the band signed to Sancrosanct Records and released their debut lyric video for "Watch it Burn". In 2017, they announced their sophomore EP, Depths. They released their debut single, "Put It To Death", in November 2017, which featured Ryan Kirby of Fit for a King. Soon thereafter, the band released "Only Soul", the second single from the EP. Two days before the release of the EP, they released their final single, "Beyond Reach", and also that former guitarist Kyle Robinson had rejoined the band. In 2018, Nick McLendon joined the band on drums and Victoria Messer joined the band temporarily to perform Rhythm Guitars. Wade departed from the project around late 2018 or early 2019, with Messer putting out an announcement looking for new members shortly after.

== Influences and style ==
The band states their influences as Demon Hunter, Living Sacrifice, Killswitch Engage, Sleeping Giant, Disciple, Project 86, The O.C. Supertones, Lecrae and War of Ages. The band, however, has been compared to many bands, including 12 Stones, As I Lay Dying, Five Finger Death Punch, Killswitch Engage (Howard Jones era), Avenged Sevenfold, Demon Hunter, Living Sacrifice, Convictions, Three Days Grace, Alove for Enemies and The Showdown.

Dire describes their genre simply as hard rock and heavy metal, however, many reviewers have called them metalcore, groove metal, hardcore punk and deathcore.

== Members ==
Current

- Joran Messer – vocals, lead guitar (2010–present), guitar (2015–2018)
- Trey Hutchinson –rhythm guitar(2020–present)
- Caleb Barnes – bass (2020–present), drums (live)
- Nick McLendon – drums (2018–present)

Former

- Victoria Messer - rhythm guitar (2018-2020)
- Brandon Wade – bass guitar (2010–2019)
- Kyle Robinson – rhythm guitar (2010–2015, 2017–2018)

Timeline

== Discography ==
EPs

- Dire EP (2013; Independent)
- Depths (2017; Sancrosanct)
- Crush The Head (2023; Independent)

Studio albums

- Volume 1 (2016; Independent)

Singles

- "Put It To Death" (2017; Sancrosanct)
- "Only Soul" (2017; Sancrosanct)
- "Beyond Reach" (2017; Sancrosanct)
- "Jingle Bells" (2020; Independent)
- "Oblivion God" (2021; Independent)
- "Holding On" (2022; Independent)
- "Enemy" (2024; Independent)
- "Frosty The Snowman" (2024; Independent)
- "Break The Skin (Havaq Remix)" (2025; Independent)

Compilation appearances

- Metal from the Dragon (Vol. 2) (2017; The Bearded Dragon Productions)
