= Vials of Wrath =

American Christian metal band

- Origin: Princeton, West Virginia
- Genres: Christian metal, unblack metal death metal, Ambient black metal
- Years active: 2011–present
- Labels: Unblack Metal Scene / Black Metal Underground; Vision of God; Avantgarde Music; Flowing Downward
- Spinoff of: Bloodline Severed
- Members: Dempsey W. Mills Jr. ("DC" Mills)
- Website: Vials of Wrath on Facebook

Vials of Wrath was an American Christian metal band, who play a mixture of unblack metal and death metal music, with one member Dempsey "DC" Woodrow Mills Jr. He is from Princeton, West Virginia, however the band was formed in 2011 in Charlotte, NC. The band has released three studio albums, Seeking Refuge in 2013, Days Without Names in 2015, and Dark Winter Memories in 2019. The project has released four extended plays, Vials of Wrath, in 2011, Let There Be Light, in 2013, Ataraxia and The Ways of Old in 2018.

== Background ==
Vials of Wrath is a one-piece Christian metal band, playing unblack metal and death metal music, featuring Dempsey "DC" Mills, originally from Princeton, West Virginia. Vials of Wrath was formed in 2011 when Mills was not performing with North Carolina's Christian deathcore band Bloodline Severed, but wanted to write and record in the vein of his pre-Christian musical influences. Mills started Vials of Wrath after leaving Bloodline Severed to focus on his job full-time. Mills has been a Christian since 1998. He is a former rhythm/lead guitarist and background vocalist for Bloodline Severed. The band name Vials of Wrath comes from Revelation 16, where it states, "'Go your ways, and pour out the vials of the wrath of God upon the earth.'"

== Music history ==
Started as a band/project in 2011, with his first extended play, Vials of Wrath, releasing that year. The first studio album, Seeking Refuge, was released on April 30, 2013, and was recorded in Mills' own Wildwood Studios in Maryville, Tennessee. Its second extended play, Let There Be Light, was released the same year, in 2013, featuring remixed versions of the songs from the 2011 EP along with two additional tracks.

The band's second studio album, Days Without Names, was released on September 1, 2015, and was again recorded in Mills' home recording studio, however its name was changed to Fallen Oak Recording. An EP, Ataraxia, was released in the summer of 2018 with a limited edition CD pressing via Mills' own Fallen Oak Recordings label. In November 2018, the band announced their signing to Avantgarde Music sub-label Flowing Downward, and released its third full-length, Dark Winter Memories, in 2019.

On April 12, 2026 Dempsey Mills announced on the Facebook page Vials of Wrath that he was laying it to rest and that he was looking at a potential future project.

== Members ==
Current members

- Dempsey W. Mills Jr. (a.k.a. "DC" Mills) – Lead Vocals, all instruments (ex-Bloodline Severed, ex-Endless Descent, Pallidus)

Session members

- Derek Corzine (ex-Bloodline Severed) – Guitars (2015)
- R. Michael Cook (A Hill to Die Upon) – Drums (2015)
- Aaron Macemore (Bloodline Severed) – Guitars, vocals (2015)
- Josh Thieler (Slaves B.C., Twilight Fauna) – Drums (2019)

== Discography ==
Studio albums

- Seeking Refuge (April 30, 2013)
- Days Without Names (September 1, 2015); featured guest musicians R. Michael Cook from A Hill to Die Upon, Derek Corzine from Whisper From Heaven and Blood Thirsty, and Aaron Macemore from Bloodline Severed.
- Dark Winter Memories (December 8, 2019); featured guest musician Josh Thieler of Slaves B.C.
- Remnants for Remembrance (October 7, 2025)

EPs

- Vials of Wrath (2011)
- Let There Be Light (July 23, 2013)
- Ataraxia (August 21, 2018)
- The Ways of Old (August 29, 2018)

Split EPs

- Vials of Wrath/Warfrozen (2011; Split w/Warfrozen)
- Consuming Fire/Vials of Wrath (2017; Split w/ Consuming Fire)

Demos

- Empty Words (2013)
- Vengeance Is Mine (2013)

Compilation appearances

- Metal From The Dragon (Vol. 1) (2017; The Bearded Dragon Productions)
- Hymns of the Blackest Light Volumes 1 (2017; Fallen Oak Recording)
- Hymns of the Blackest Light Volume 2 (2018; Fallen Oak Recording)

Documentary appearances

- Metal Missionaries: The Documentary (2017)
- True American Black Metal (2020)
