= Dominion (War of Ages album) =

Studio album by War of Ages
- Released: September 15, 2023
- Length: 38:05
- Label: Facedown
- Producer: Jack Daniels

War of Ages chronology
Rhema (2021)	Dominion (2023)

Singles from Dominion
- 1. "Dominus" Released: August 11, 2023; 2. "Armageddon" Released: August 11, 2023; 3. "Laodicea" Released: August 25, 2023; 4. "Apocalypsis" Released: September 6, 2023

Professional ratings
Review scores
Source	Rating
Jesus Freak Hideout	4.5/5 stars
Metal Trenches	8.7/10 stars

Dominion is the ninth studio album by American Christian metal band War of Ages. The album was released on September 15, 2023, through Facedown Records and was produced by Jack Daniels, the band's rhythm guitarist. It is the last album by the band to feature recordings of drummer Kaleb Luebchow following his death in July 2022 of unspecified causes. The album is dedicated to his memory.

== Background and promotion ==
On August 11, 2023, War of Ages released two singles "Dominus" and "Armageddon". At the same time, they officially announced the album itself and release date, whilst also revealing the album cover and the track list. On August 25, the band unveiled the third single "Laodicea". On September 6, one week before the album release, the band published the fourth single "Apocalypsis".

== Track listing ==
All lyrics are written by War of Ages; all music is composed by War of Ages.

Dominion track listing
No.	Title	Length
1.	"Famine"	4:13
2.	"Dominus"	3:58
3.	"Victorum"	3:46
4.	"War"	4:27
5.	"Apocalypsis"	4:06
6.	"Armageddon"	3:22
7.	"Death"	3:40
8.	"Laodicea"	3:42
9.	"Horror"	3:17
10.	"Misery"	3:34
Total length:		38:05

== Personnel ==
credits adapted from liner notes.

War of Ages

- Leroy Hamp – lead vocals
- Steve Brown – lead guitar
- Jack Daniels – rhythm guitar, production, mixing, engineering
- Elisha Mullins – bass, editing, engineering
- Kaleb Luebchow – drums (posthumous)

Production

- Jeff Dunne – mastering
- Justin Aufdemkampe – engineering
- Dave Quiggle – album artwork
- Chris Ratzlaff – layout
