= Celestial Completion =

2011 studio album by Becoming the Archetype

Studio album by Becoming the Archetype
- Released: March 29, 2011
- Genre: Progressive death metal
- Length: 46:34
- Label: Solid State
- Producer: Matt Goldman

Becoming the Archetype chronology
Dichotomy (2008)	Celestial Completion (2011)	I Am (2012)

Celestial Completion is the fourth studio album by American heavy metal band Becoming the Archetype, released on March 29, 2011, through Solid State Records.

Becoming the Archetype added some diversity and unusual elements to their sound on Celestial Completion. The album features instruments and techniques that are not common for a metal band, including: trombones, sitars, tamburas, tablas, vocoders, an intro with "operatic soprano vocals and four-part harmony," and a recording of a Mass.

In April 2010, when the group was only in the early stages of writing a new album, Celestial Completion was given the working title of In a Monstrous World of Half-Human Deities, Some People Will Unfortunately Die from Old Age.

Ryan Clark, art director for Solid State Records and vocalist for Demon Hunter, contacted Dan Seagrave to design the artwork for Celestial Completion. Seagrave had previously designed the art for Becoming the Archetype's debut album Terminate Damnation.

In its debut week, Celestial Completion sold approximately 2,100 copies and ranked at number 7 on Billboard's Top Heatseekers chart.

The title of track four, "The Path of the Beam", is a reference to Stephen King's The Dark Tower, which bassist/vocalist, Jason Wisdom, and guitarist/keyboardist/clean vocalist, Seth Hecox are both fans of.

This would be vocalist/bassist Jason Wisdom's and drummer Brent Duckett's last album with Becoming the Archetype until 2022, as they both parted ways with the band in November 2011.

== Track listing ==
No.	Title	Length
1.	"The Resonant Frequency of Flesh"	2:11
2.	"The Magnetic Sky"	4:26
3.	"Internal Illumination"	5:10
4.	"Path of the Beam"	5:00
5.	"Music of the Spheres: Requiem Aeternam I"	1:33
6.	"Elemental Wrath: Requiem Aeternam II"	7:51
7.	"Xenosynthesis: Requiem Aeternam III"	3:16
8.	"Invisible Creature"	0:41
9.	"Cardiac Rebellion"	5:17
10.	"Reflect/Refract"	4:37
11.	"Breathing Light"	6:32
Total length:		46:34

== Personnel ==
Celestial Completion credits as adapted from Allmusic.

Becoming the Archetype

- Jason Wisdom - vocals/bass
- Count Seth Hecox - guitars/keys/vocals
- Daniel Gailey - guitars/vocals
- Brent "Duck" Duckett - drums

Additional musicians

- Ivey Norton – vocals on tracks 1 & 7
- Nathan O'Brien – trombone on track 1
- Dennis Culp (Five Iron Frenzy)– trombone on track 9
- Kim Stice – violin on track 11
- Sean Patrick Murphy – sitar, tambura & tablas on tracks 6 & 8

Production and recording

- Troy Glessner – mastering
- Matt Goldman – engineer, mixing, producer
- Matt McClellan – engineer

Artwork and packaging

- Becoming the Archetype – art direction
- Ryan Clark – design
- Dan Seagrave – painting
- Troy Stains – band photo
