= Unite Us All =

EP by Point Zero
- Released: September 27, 2004
- Recorded: June 2004
- Genre: Metalcore, Christian metal
- Length: 16:14
- Label: Independent release

Point Zero chronology
| Unite Us All (2004) | War of Ages (2005) |

Unite Us All is the first EP by American Christian metal band Point Zero, now known as War of Ages. It features guest vocals by Stone (of the band Anne Gohra) and Joel Quiggle, with album artwork by Death Squad Design. After this EP the band renamed themselves to avoid lawsuits by corporate companies.

== Track listing ==
| No. | Title | Length |
|---|---|---|
| 1. | "My Solitude" | 3:31 |
| 2. | "False Prophet" | 4:20 |
| 3. | "Broken Before You" | 3:51 |
| 4. | "One Day" | 4:33 |
| Total length: | | 16:14 |

== War of Ages ==
Credits adapted from Herbmusic.

- Leroy Hamp - lead vocals
- Steve Brown - lead guitar, backing vocals
- Matt Moore - rhythm guitar
- Nate Owensby - bass guitar, triangle
- Rob Kerner - drums
