= War of Ages =

American Christian metal band

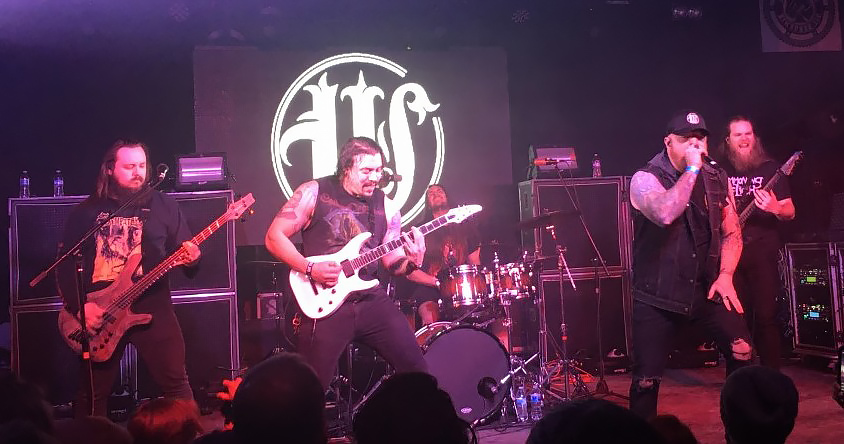
- War of Ages performing in 2020

Background information
- Also known as: Point Zero (2002–2005)
- Origin: Erie, Pennsylvania, U.S.
- Genres: Christian metal; metalcore
- Years active: 2002–present
- Labels: Strike First, Facedown
- Members: Leroy Hamp; Steve Brown; Jack Daniels; Elisha Mullins
- Past members: John Lynch; Matt Moore; Kang Garnic; Nate Owensby; Branon Berntowicz; T.J. Alford; Mark Randazzo; Ryan Tidwell; Brendan Hengle; Rob Kerner; Alex Hamp; Kaleb Luebchow
- Website: warofagesmetal.com

War of Ages (sometimes abbreviated WoA; formerly known as Point Zero) is an American Christian metalcore band formed in Erie, Pennsylvania in 2002. It consists of vocalist Leroy Hamp, lead guitarist Steve Brown, rhythm guitarist Jack Daniels and bassist Elisha Mullins. The band is signed to Facedown Records and has released ten studio albums, with their most recent one, Dominion, being released in 2023.

== History ==
War of Ages began in 2002, originally as Point Zero. The band recorded their debut EP, Unite Us All. Shortly after this release, the band switched names to War of Ages and signed with Strike First Records. The band connected with the label via their friends in xDISCIPLEx A.D., who were also from Erie, Pennsylvania.

The band would record a self-titled debut, which was released by Strike First Records in July 2005. However, Kang Garnic replaced Moore during this time on guitars. In 2006, the band released their sophomore album, Pride of the Wicked, adding on former Mortal Treason bassist TJ Alford, Hamp's brother Alex Hamp on drums, and rhythm guitarist Johnathan Lynch.

In 2007, the band released Fire from the Tomb, a re-recording of their self-titled debut album. The band went into Cathouse Studios and began recording the album. Arise and Conquer was released in 2008, with Branon Bernatowicz joining the band as rhythm guitarist. Following Arise and Conquer, the band began working with As I Lay Dying vocalist Tim Lambesis to produce their next album, Eternal, which would feature Lambesis on guest vocals, as well as Josh Gilbert and Sonny Sandoval. The album was released in April 2010. It was written to stand out and was an emotional release. The album was very well received, becoming the first to rank on the Billboard charts. In 2012, the band released their fifth studio album, Return to Life. Following in the footsteps of Eternal, the album ranked on the Billboard, but some reviewers did not enjoy the album as much.

In July 2014, the band released their sixth album, Supreme Chaos, which saw the induction of the newest member, Hope for the Dying's Jack Daniels on rhythm guitars. With Daniels addition, the band added a very European style. The album would also rank on the Billboard charts, ranking at 107 on the Billboard 200, 37 on Billboard Rock charts, 14 on Hard Rock charts, 5 on the Christian charts, and 24 on the Independent albums charts.

In December 2017, the band released their seventh album, Alpha, with the lineup of Hamp, Daniels, Brown, and a session drummer, Alex Rüdinger, who also worked with The Faceless and 7 Horns 7 Eyes. In September 2019, the band released their eighth studio album, Void, alongside several singles. The album would also be the debut for The Burial members Elisha Mullins on bass and Kaleb Luebchow on drums. On June 25, 2021, War of Ages released a new single, "No Altars". On September 24, the band released another single, "Pyrite", and also announced the release of a new EP, Rhema, on October 29.

On July 29, 2022, the band announced that drummer Kaleb Luebchow died two days prior, without specifying the cause of death. On August 11, 2023, the band released two singles, "Dominus" and "Armageddon", from their ninth studio album, Dominion, which was released on September 15, 2023, and features posthumous recordings of Luebchow and is dedicated to his memory.

On April 15, 2025, the band announced the 15th anniversary edition of their 2010 album Eternal, remixed and reproduced and with a bonus track, "Prevail", that was lost during the recording sessions for the original album but rediscovered and completed, which released on June 13, 2025.

== Christianity ==
The band is known for their strong Christian faith which is expressed in their lyrics. In a 2009 radio interview with The Full Armor of God Broadcast, Leroy Hamp professed that as Christians the band wants to "Make a difference in a world that's covered in darkness."

== Band members ==
Current members

- Leroy Hamp – lead vocals (2002–present)
- Steve Brown – lead guitar (2002–present)
- Elisha Mullins – bass (2012, 2018–present)
- Jack Daniels – rhythm guitar (2013–present)

Touring musicians

- Isaiah Perez – drums (2024–present)
- Andy Cutrell – bass, backing vocals (2025–present)

Session musicians

- Alex Rüdinger – drums (2017)

Former members

- Nate Owensby – bass (2002–2005)
- Rob Kerner – drums (2002–2005)
- Matt Moore – rhythm guitar (2002–2004)
- Kang Garnic – rhythm guitar (2004–2005)
- T.J. Alford – bass, backing vocals (2005–2012)
- Luke Johnathan Lynch – rhythm guitar, backing vocals (2005–2008)
- Branon Bernatowicz – rhythm guitar (2006–2012), bass (2016–2017)
- Mark Randazzo – rhythm guitar, backing vocals (2012–2013)
- Ryan Tidwell – bass, backing vocals (2013–2014)
- Brendan Hengle – bass (2014–2016)
- Alex Hamp – drums (2005–2017)
- Kaleb Luebchow – drums (2017–2022; died 2022)

Timeline

== Discography ==
War of Ages discography
- Studio albums: 10
- Extended plays: 2
- Singles: 8
- Music videos: 11

Studio albums

| Year | Title | Label | Chart peaks | | | | | |
| Year | Title | Label | US | US Heat | US Rock | US Hard Rock | Christian | Independent |
|---|---|---|---|---|---|---|---|---|
| 2005 | War of Ages | Strike First Records | — | — | — | — | — | — |
| 2006 | Pride of the Wicked | Facedown Records | — | — | — | — | — | — |
| 2008 | Arise and Conquer | Facedown Records | — | — | — | — | — | — |
| 2010 | Eternal | Facedown Records | 179 | 5 | — | 19 | — | 28 |
| 2012 | Return to Life | Facedown Records | 155 | — | 46 | 8 | 8 | 28 |
| 2014 | Supreme Chaos | Facedown Records | 107 | — | 37 | 14 | 5 | 24 |
| 2017 | Alpha | Facedown Records | — | — | — | — | — | — |
| 2019 | Void | Facedown Records | — | — | — | — | — | — |
| 2023 | Dominion | Facedown Records | — | — | — | — | — | — |

EPs

- Unite Us All (2004) (independent EP)
- Rhema (2021) (Facedown Records)

Re-recording album

- Fire from the Tomb (2007) (Facedown Records)

Music videos

- "Stand Your Ground" (directed by: Facedown Records)
- "Strength Within" (directed by: Facedown Records)
- "Through the Flames" (directed by: Andy Reale)
- "All Consuming Fire" (directed by: Andy Reale)
- "Collapse" (directed by: Drew Russ)
- "Silent Night" (directed by: DJ Cosgrove)
- "From Ashes" (directed by: Matt Spencer)
- "Chaos Theory" (directed by: Matt Spencer)
- "Lionheart" (directed by: Matt Spencer)
- "Creator" (directed by: Matt Spencer)
- "Miles Apart" (directed by: Matt Spencer)
