= Terminate Damnation =

Studio album by Becoming the Archetype
- Released: August 30, 2005
- Recorded: 2005
- Studios: Compound Recordings, Magnolia, Texas
- Genres: Progressive death metal, metalcore
- Length: 54:28
- Label: Solid State
- Producer: Zach Hodges

Becoming the Archetype chronology
The Remnant (2004)	Terminate Damnation (2005)	The Physics of Fire (2007)

Professional ratings
Review scores
Source	Rating
Jesus Freak Hideout	4/5 stars
MusicOMH	(?)
Rock Hard	8.5/10

Terminate Damnation is the debut studio album by American heavy metal band Becoming the Archetype. The album was released on August 30, 2005. The title of the album was taken from the song "Terminate Damnation" from the Mortification album, Scrolls of the Megilloth.

The album artwork was painted by Dan Seagrave, who has been commissioned to draw many metal album covers.

Terminate Damnation was released on vinyl with a limited pressing of 500 by Broken Circles Records in 2011.

== Track listing ==
No.	Title	Length
1.	"March of the Dead"	1:42
2.	"Into Oblivion"	6:01
3.	"One Man Parade"	4:51
4.	"Elegy": "I: Deception" (featuring Ryan Clark of Demon Hunter); "II: Lament"; "III: Triumph"	11:14: 5:30; 3:38; 2:06
5.	"Night's Sorrow"	3:51
6.	"The Epigone"	5:00
7.	"Beyond Adaptation"	2:34
8.	"No Fall Too Far"	5:46
9.	"Ex Nihilo"	5:08
10.	"Denouement"	1:44
11.	"The Trivial Paroxysm"	6:37
Total length:		54:28

== Personnel ==
BTA

- Jason Wisdom – vocals, bass guitar
- Jon Star – guitars, engineering
- Sean Cunningham – guitars
- Seth Hecox – guitars, keyboards
- Brent Duckett – drums

Additional musicians

- Ryan Clark – vocals on "Elegy I: Deception", A&R

Production

- Zach Hodges – producer, engineering, drum recording
- Troy Glessner – drum recording
- Jeff Gros – photography
- Jonathan Dunn – A&R
- Aaron Mlasko – drum tech
- Dan Seagrave – cover art
- Tue Madsen – mixing, mastering
