= Dire wolf (disambiguation) =

A dire wolf is an extinct canine.

Dire wolf or direwolf may also refer to:

- Direwolf (Game of Thrones), a fictional creature in George R. R. Martin's A Song of Ice and Fire series
- "Dire Wolf" (song), a song by the Grateful Dead from Workingman's Dead
- Worg (Dungeons & Dragons) or dire wolf, a type of dire animal in Dungeons & Dragons
- Dire Wolves, a group of characters from Cro
