= Solamors =

American Christian metal band

- Origin: Pennsylvania and Georgia
- Genres: Technical death metal, Christian metal, melodic death metal
- Years active: 2012–2015
- Label: Independent
- Members: Jason Wisdom; Alex Kenis; Travis Turner
- Website: solamors.com

Solamors was a Christian metal band formed in 2012. The band has become a project of members of Becoming the Archetype, Aletheian, and UnTeachers.

== Members ==
Current members
| Name | Instrument | Years | Other groups |
|---|---|---|---|
| Jason Wisdom | vocals | 2012–2015 | Death Therapy, Becoming the Archetype |
| Alex Kenis | guitars, bass guitar, keyboards | 2012–2015 | Synoptic Rise, Becoming the Archetype, Aletheian, Crutch |
| Travis "Trav" Turner | drums, percussion | 2012–2015 | Aletheian, Crutch, UnTeachers, Mid-Evil, The Satire, The Houselights, Half Bomber |

== Discography ==
- Depravity's Demise (2013)
