= Becoming the Archetype =

American heavy metal band

- Becoming the Archetype performing in 2009

Background information
- Also known as: Nonexistent Failure (1999–2002); The Remnant (2002–2004)
- Origin: Atlanta, Georgia, U.S.
- Genres: Technical death metal; metalcore; progressive metal; Christian metal
- Years active: 1999–2013, 2022–present
- Labels: Solid State; Century Media
- Members: Jason Wisdom; Brent "Duck" Duckett; Seth Hecox
- Past members: Jon Star; Sean Cunningham; Wes Gaither; Jacob Franklin; Alex Kenis; Brandon Lopez; Michael McClellan; Chris McCane; Daniel Gailey; Codey Watkins; Chris Heaton
- Website: iambecomingthearchetype.com

Becoming the Archetype is an American Christian metal band formed in Atlanta, Georgia, in 1999. They have released six albums on Solid State Records. Dichotomy, released in November 2008, sold around 2,300 copies in the United States in its first week of release, according to Nielsen Soundscan. The CD debuted at No. 18 on the Top New Artist Albums (Heatseekers) chart, which lists the best-selling albums by new and developing artists, defined as those who have never appeared in the top 100 of the Billboard 200. The band was part of the new wave of American heavy metal. After 2012's I Am, the band went on an indefinite hiatus. In 2022, the band reunited with the lineup of Jason Wisdom, Seth Hecox and Brent "Duck" Duckett.

== History ==
The band formed in 1999 with two vocalists, including Jason Wisdom and Jake Power, guitarists Greg Knapp and Sean Cunningham, bassist Noah, and drummer Brent "Duck" Duckett under the moniker Nonexistent Failure.

Power, Noah, and Knapp left the band before they recorded a demo. The band recorded their first demo in 2001. Before joining Solid State Records, the band changed their name to The Remnant and released an independent self-titled album.

Members of Demon Hunter approached the band at Cornerstone Festival in 2004, and told them to change their name, as there was punk band named The Remnants.

The band changed to Becoming the Archetype. Wisdom claims that he came up with the name.

In December 2004, the band signed with Solid State. The next year, the band released their first nationwide album, Terminate Damnation, whose title comes from a song of the same name by Christian death metal band Mortification, mixed by Tue Madsen. The album blended progressive metal, death metal and metalcore.

In 2006, the band's longtime lead guitarist and one of the primary songwriters, Jon Star, amicably left the band for personal reasons.

The band's first tour of 2006 was a 24-date run in Europe with The Chariot and Shaped by Fate with lead guitar replacement, Alex Kenis from progressive death metal group, Aletheian. In July 2006, original guitarist Sean Cunningham left the band for his last semester in college and to pursue a full-time career. Determined to press on, in the fall of 2006, the band went back into the studio with producer Andreas Magnusson (The Agony Scene, Scarlet, The Black Dahlia Murder, Calico System, Twelve Tribes); The Physics of Fire, was released May 2007. The band promoted the album on "The Trilogy of Hairs" (Bring Your Own Beard, Peel Your Wig Back, Born With a Mustache) tour. The bearded skull artwork for the Bring Your Own Beard has been dubbed "Clifton", named after Aletheian/Solamors drummer Clifton Travis Turner, and is BTA's mascot, according to Jason Wisdom. Also, Brent Duckett took an indefinite break from the band in late 2007 for personal reasons.

In 2008, Alex Kenis left and was replaced with the band's former lead guitarist, Jon Star. In the spring of 2008, the band wrote its third studio album and recorded it with stand-in drummer Brandon Lopez (Broken Flesh) in Summer '08 with producer Devin Townsend (Strapping Young Lad). In November 2008, the band released Dichotomy. The album's concept was inspired by the Space Trilogy by C.S. Lewis and uses the same themes of biology vs. technology and man vs. machine. The sixth song on the album, "Ransom" is named after the main character of the trilogy. On October 31, 2008, Brent "Duck" Duckett returned. The band was featured in the 2008 Nov/Dec issue of HM Magazine and tour support also followed. In October 2009, the band released a new single titled "Necrotizing Fasciitis". The single was packaged with a Necrotizing Fasciitis-themed shirt. "Clifton", the bearded skull, returned on the single's artwork.

In 2010, Becoming the Archetype's lead guitarist Jon Star left the band once again and was replaced with guitarist Daniel Gailey.

Becoming the Archetype's fourth album, Celestial Completion, was recorded in Glow in the Dark studios, in Atlanta, Georgia with producer Matt Goldman (Underoath, The Chariot, Vanna), from October to November 2010. It included new concepts, such as trombone by Dennis Culp of Five Iron Frenzy and sitars and tablas. The band released a single, "The Magnetic Sky," on February 14, 2011, to promote the album. Beginning on Friday, March 18, one new song from Celestial Completion was released per day until the album's release, on March 29, as a part of the "12 days of BTA." A video for The Magnetic Sky premiered at MetalSucks.net on the same day of the album's release. Guitarist Seth Hecox did an interview discussing the lyrical themes of "The Magnetic Sky".

In late November, after playing "over 80 shows in 12 different countries in just an 8 month span," with bands such as Creations and The Tug Fork River Band, and writing, recording, and releasing the single Oh Holy Night, the band announced that Jason Wisdom and Brent Duckett were leaving the band. It was announced that Chris McCane would be the band's new lead vocalist and they had found a new drummer (later announced on their Facebook as Michael McClellan). Seth Hecox and lead guitarist Daniel Gailey were in the process of writing songs for the next album.

In April 2012, the band announced they would enter the studio with producer Shane Frisby (Bury Your Dead, The Ghost Inside, Corpus Christi) from May 21 through June 18 to record their fifth full-length album for Solid State Records. The band added bassist Codey Watkins, formerly of the Chattanooga, TN-based hardcore band In This Hour, to the lineup, announced via Facebook. Drummer Michael McClellan left shortly before going into the studio and was replaced with Chris Heaton, formerly of the Knoxville, TN-based hardcore band Dear Lovely. Their album I Am was released September 18, 2012.

Around 2015, guitarist Dan Gailey stated that the band was discussing new material, and when asked by the interviewers if the lineup was the same as the I Am lineup, his answer was "No". Gailey joined Phinehas in 2014 and then Fit for a King in 2018.

On June 24, 2022, the band announced their return from their hiatus and announced their new album, Children of the Great Extinction, released on August 26 through Solid State. The album is the first to feature Wisdom and Duckett alongside Hecox since Celestial Completion. The album features guitar cameos by former band members Alex Kenis and Daniel Gailey (currently of Fit for a King), as well as guest vocals by Ryan Clark of Demon Hunter.

The band performed at the 2023 Furnace Fest along with Norma Jean, Anberlin, Project 86, Throwdown and Hatebreed. The festival was their first major live show in over a decade.

In July 2025, the band published a photo of their recording studio, implying that they are in the process of making their next record.

== Etymology and Christianity ==
The members are professed Christians, and the band takes its name from Genesis 1:26: "God said, 'Let us make man in our image.'" Since Jesus Christ was the only person to ever be sinless, He was the archetype of humanity; the band's name reflects this belief. In a 2008 interview with The Full Armor of God Broadcast, Jason Wisdom summed up the band's philosophy, stating "If we are not making a difference for the Lord, then we are just out there making noise!"

== Band members ==
Current members

- Jason Wisdom (Solamors, Death Therapy) – lead vocals (1999–2011, 2022–present), bass (2003–2011, 2022–present)
- Brent "Duck" Duckett – drums (1999–2008, 2008–2011, 2022–present)
- Seth Andrew Hecox (Anchors) – lead guitar (2022–present), rhythm guitar, keyboards, clean vocals (2004–2013, 2022–present)

Former members

- Jon Star – lead guitar (1999–2006, 2008–2010)
- Martin Cunningham – rhythm and lead guitar (2011–2012)
- Wes Gaither – bass (1999–2003)
- Jacob Franklin – rhythm guitar (2001–2004) (ex-Irreversible)
- Alex "Dracula" Kenis (formerly of Synoptic Rise, Aletheian, Solamors) – lead guitar, clean vocals (2006–2008)
- Sean Cunningham – rhythm guitar (1999–2006), lead guitar (2001–2006)
- Brandon Lopez (Broken Flesh, formerly of An Unearthly Child, and Vangough) – drums (2008)
- Daniel Gailey – lead guitar, backing vocals (Thaddeus, Phinehas, Fit for a King) (2010–2013)
- Chris McCane – lead vocals (ex-Thaddeus) (2011–2013)
- Codey Watkins (ex-In This Hour) – bass (2012–2013)
- Chris Heaton (ex-Dear Lovely) – drums, percussion (2012–2013)

Touring musicians

- Abishai Collingsworth (The Overseer, Wolves at the Gate, Project 86) – drums (2011)
- Chris McCane – vocals (2011)
- Bradley Riggs (The Overseer) – bass (2011)
- Michael McClellan ('68) – drums (2011–2012)
- Nate Washburn (My Epic) – guitars (2022–present)

Session musicians

- Ryan Clark – vocals (2005, 2008, 2022)
- Devin Townsend – vocals (2008)
- Suzanne Richter – soprano vocals (2008)
- Dennis Culp (of Five Iron Frenzy) – trombone (2011)
- Nathan O'Brien – trombone (2011)
- Kim Stice – violin (2011)
- Sean Patrick Murphy – sitar, tambura, tabla (2011)
- Ivey Norton Spears – vocals (2011)
- Nate Washburn – guitars (2022)

Timeline

== Discography ==
=== As Nonexistent Failure ===
Demos

- In Loving Memory of Everything... I Never Had (2002)

=== As the Remnant ===
Demos

- Death, Destruction, and Mayhem (2003)

Studio albums

- The Remnant (2004, self-released)

=== As Becoming the Archetype ===
Studio albums

Year	Album	Label	Charts	
Year	Album	Label	US Heat	US Christ
2005	Terminate Damnation	Solid State Records	—	—
2007	The Physics of Fire	Solid State/Century Media	13	19
2008	Dichotomy	Solid State Records	19	41
2011	Celestial Completion	Solid State Records	7	18
2012	I Am	Solid State Records	16	17
2022	Children of the Great Extinction	Solid State Records	—	—

EPs

- Celestial Progression (2012; Solid State)

Singles

- "Necrotizing Fasciitis" (non-album digital single, 2009, Solid State)
- "O Holy Night" (non-album digital single, 2011, Solid State)
- "The Time Bender" (I Am, 2012, Solid State Records)
- "The Lost Colony" (Children of the Great Extinction, 2022, Solid State Records)

Music videos

- "Endure" (The Physics of Fire) – 2007
- "The Magnetic Sky" (Celestial Completion) – 2011
- "Breathing Light" (Celestial Completion) – 2011
- "The Time Bender" (I Am) – 2012
