= Aletheian =

American Christian death metal band

- Also known as: Crutch
- Origin: Lebanon, Pennsylvania, U.S.
- Genre: Progressive death metal
- Years active: 1997–present
- Labels: IronClad, Hope Prevails, Burning
- Members: Alex Kenis; Joel Thorpe; Joe Walmer
- Past members: Travis Turner; Keith Isenberg; Vinnie Aldrege; Bryan Clarkson; Travis Wagner; Donny Swigart
- Website: www.aletheian.com

Aletheian are a Christian progressive/melodic death metal band. They formed in Lebanon, Pennsylvania in 1997 as Crutch, then changed their name to "Aletheian" prior to the 2003 album Apolutrosis. Guitarist Alex Kenis joined Becoming the Archetype in 2007. In the early 2007, Aletheian signed to IronClad Recordings, an imprint of Metal Blade Records.

== Biography ==
Aletheian was originally formed under the name Crutch in 1997. With the lineup of Alex Kenis on guitars, Keith Isenberg on bass, Vinnie Aldrich on vocals, and Bryan Clarkson on drums, the band began writing material. The early material was metalcore oriented rather than what the band became known for later. Aldrich was not in the band for long. His position was filled by Joel Thorpe, who would record on the band's debut album, Crutch. Following that, an EP was being written, initially titled Annealed by Animosity, which they changed to Transitions. Clarkson left the band, with Travis Turner taking over the position. Donny Swigart joined the band at this time, in 1999. Turner was recommended by his cousin, Stephen Sarro of Tantrum of the Muse, which led to him and Kenis speaking over the phone about his influences, which included Cephalic Carnage and Damn the Machine. Influenced by Death, Cynic, Carcass, Emperor, Fates Warning, Dream Theater, Meshuggah, and At the Gates, the band shifted their style in that direction. They released their debut, ...Hope Prevails, independently in 2001. The album was re-released on Burning Records, a label created by Mike Fealko of the hardcore punk and metalcore band Vessel, in 2002.

The group changed its name to Aletheian, a derivation of the Greek word for "truth", in the sense of "discovering", in 2003 when the band underwent a major line-up change acquiring two new members and decided to take the band to the touring level for the first time. Isenberg departed the band due to family matters, as did Turner, whose wife was pregnant with twins at the time. The style and material of the band did not change with the name, combining technical, progressive, Scandinavian, and melodic death metal elements. Apolutrosis, a full-length concept album, pre-release made available independently in 2003. The album was supposed to be released as an EP; however, Century Media Records was interested in the band at the time, but only if they recorded a full-length. This led the band to record several instrumental tracks in addition to the four tracks they had finished. Following the recording of the album, Century Media was no longer interested. It was re-mixed and re-mastered for full release in 2004 on Hope Prevails Productions. The same year ...Hope Prevails was partially re-recorded, re-mixed, re-mastered, and re-released with updated artwork and the name Aletheian on Hope Prevails Productions. Dying Vine was recorded, mixed, and mastered at Studio Insomnia. The album was delayed due to Kenis injuring his hand with a box-cutter knife. Kenis produced, sound teched, engineered, mixed, and mastered the album on top of playing guitars and bass on it. The album was released in July 2005 by Hope Prevails Productions. In 2005, the band released Aletheian Live DVD, featuring two hours of edited live concert footage, concept music video, behind-the-scenes recording documentary, and more. Aletheian has contributed two songs, "Break in the Clouds" and "Exaleipheian", recorded live in Ohio for Spindust Records' DVD compilation video 10/20 Underground Rock Show in 2004.

Aletheian has played festivals such as March Metal Meltdown, MACRoCk, Sick as Sin, Metal Mindrage, Ichthus, and Cornerstone Festival as well as with bands such as Cephalic Carnage, Becoming the Archetype, Biohazard, Buried Alive, Antithesis, Withered Earth, Disgorge, Zao, Living Sacrifice, Society's Finest, Tantrum of the Muse, and Underoath, among others. In early 2007, Aletheian signed to IronClad Recordings, an imprint of Metal Blade Records. In 2008, the band performed at Cornerstone with a lineup of Thorpe, Kenis, a returning Turner, Chris Keeney on guitar, and Andy High on bass. Following that show, however, the band embarked on an indefinite hiatus.

In 2016, Alex Kenis did an interview on Shoot the Shred Podcast, stating he had written all of the songs for an upcoming album but has been unable to record it due to "life happening". According to Turner, who remains in contact with Kenis, the new material is not likely to be finished, but he cannot confirm it will never happen.

== Members ==
Current members
| Name | Instrument | Years | Other groups |
|---|---|---|---|
| Alex Kenis | lead guitar, keyboards, clean vocals | 1997–present | Becoming the Archetype, Solamors, Synoptic Rise |
| Joel Thorpe | unclean vocals | 1998–present | |
| Josiah "Joe" Walmer | drums | 2003–present | Solace of Requiem, Blind Influence |

Former members
| Name | Instrument | Years | Other groups |
|---|---|---|---|
| Travis Turner | drums | 1999–2003, 2008 | Solamors, UnTeachers, Mid-Evil, The Satire, the Houselights, Half Bomber, My Brother the Woodmaker |
| Keith Isenberg | bass | 1997–2002 | |
| Vinnie Aldrich | vocals | 1997–1998 | |
| Bryan Clarkson | drums | 1997–1999 | |
| Donny Swigart | guitar | 1999–2006 | Enshrouded by Despair |

Live musicians
| Name | Instrument | Years | Other groups |
|---|---|---|---|
| Travis Wagner | bass | 2003–2007 | Dirtfedd |
| Andy High | bass | 2007–2008 | Blind Influence |
| Derek Corzine | guitars | 2007 | Bloodline Severed, Quester, Solarian, Whisper from Heaven, Blood Thirsty, Cosÿns, Crowned in Sorrow, Syringe, Vials of Wrath |
| Chris Keeney | guitar, clean vocals | 2007–2008 | Blind Influence |
| Amy Lynn Corzine | female vocals | 2007 | Whisper from Heaven, Bloodline Severed |

Timeline

== Discography ==
As Crutch

- Crutch (1998)
- Transitions (1999)
- Awe and Disbelief (2000)
- Hope Prevails (2001; Hope Prevails Productions)

As Aletheian

- Apolutrosis (2003; Hope Prevails Productions)
- Dying Vine (2005; Hope Prevails Productions)
- Live (2005)
- Dying Vine (re-release) (2008; Ironclad Recordings/Metal Blade Records)

Other songs

- "Breathing Murder" originally performed by Living Sacrifice on Living Sacrifice Tribute (2001; Clenched Fist Records)
