= Holtekilen Folk High School =

Baptist folk high school in Bærum, Norway

Coordinates: 59.9063°N 10.6073°E

Holtekilen Folk High School Norwegian: Holtekilen folkehøgskole
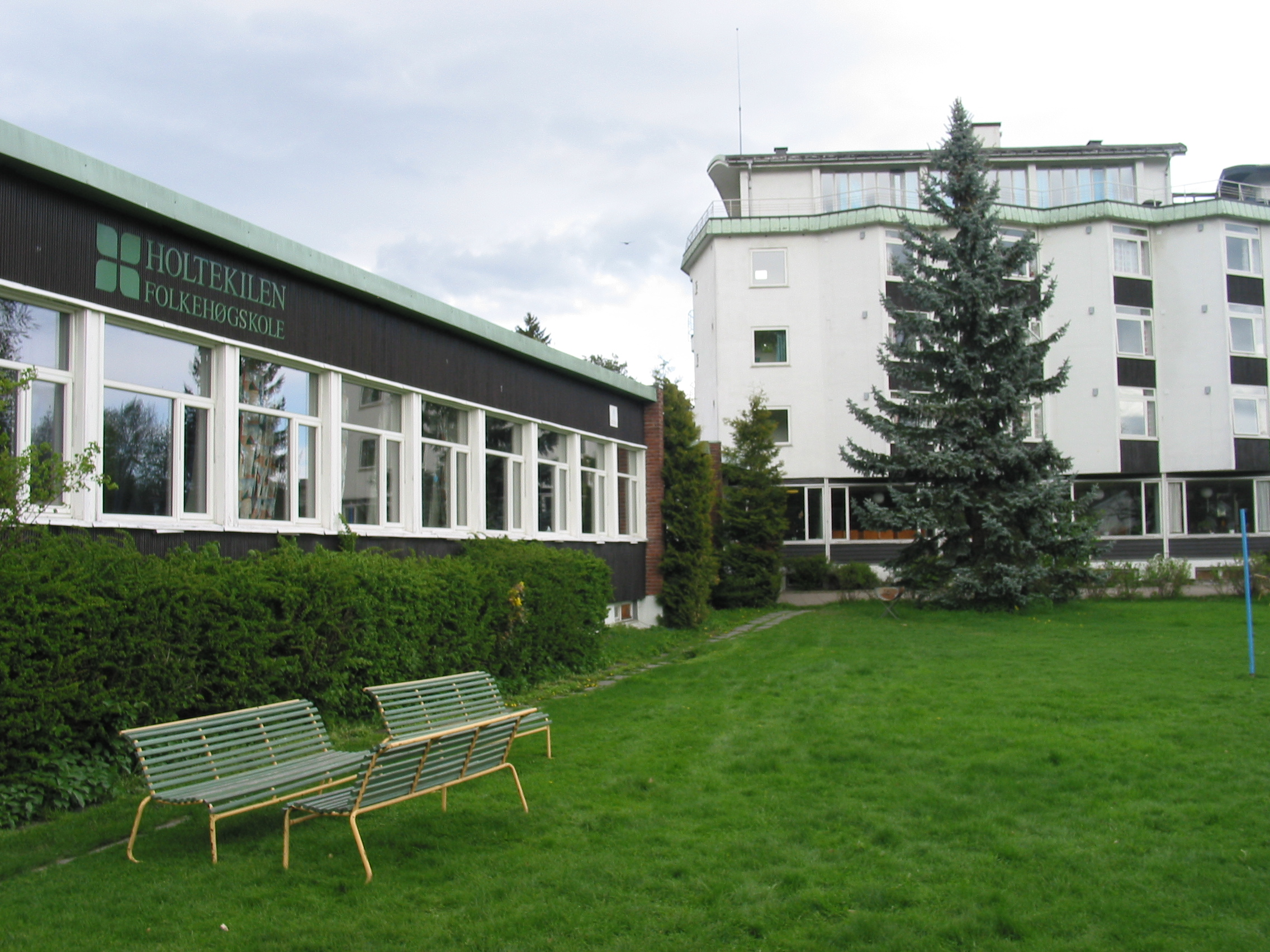

Information
- Former name: Baptist Folk High School; Norwegian: Baptistenes folkehøgskole (1958-1979)
- Religious affiliation(s): Baptist Union of Norway
- Established: 1958; 67 years ago
- Enrollment: 85

Holtekilen Folk High School (Norwegian: Holtekilen folkehøgskole) is Baptist Christian folk high school situated at Stabekk in Bærum, Norway. It has 85 pupils and is owned by the Baptist Union of Norway. It features six lines: music, fashion/design, travel, film/photography, street sociology and ethics/sustainability. It is the folk high school the closest to Oslo. The school was founded as the Baptist Folk High School (Baptistenes folkehøgskole) in 1958. It took its current name in 1979.
