= Norwegian School of Leadership and Theology =

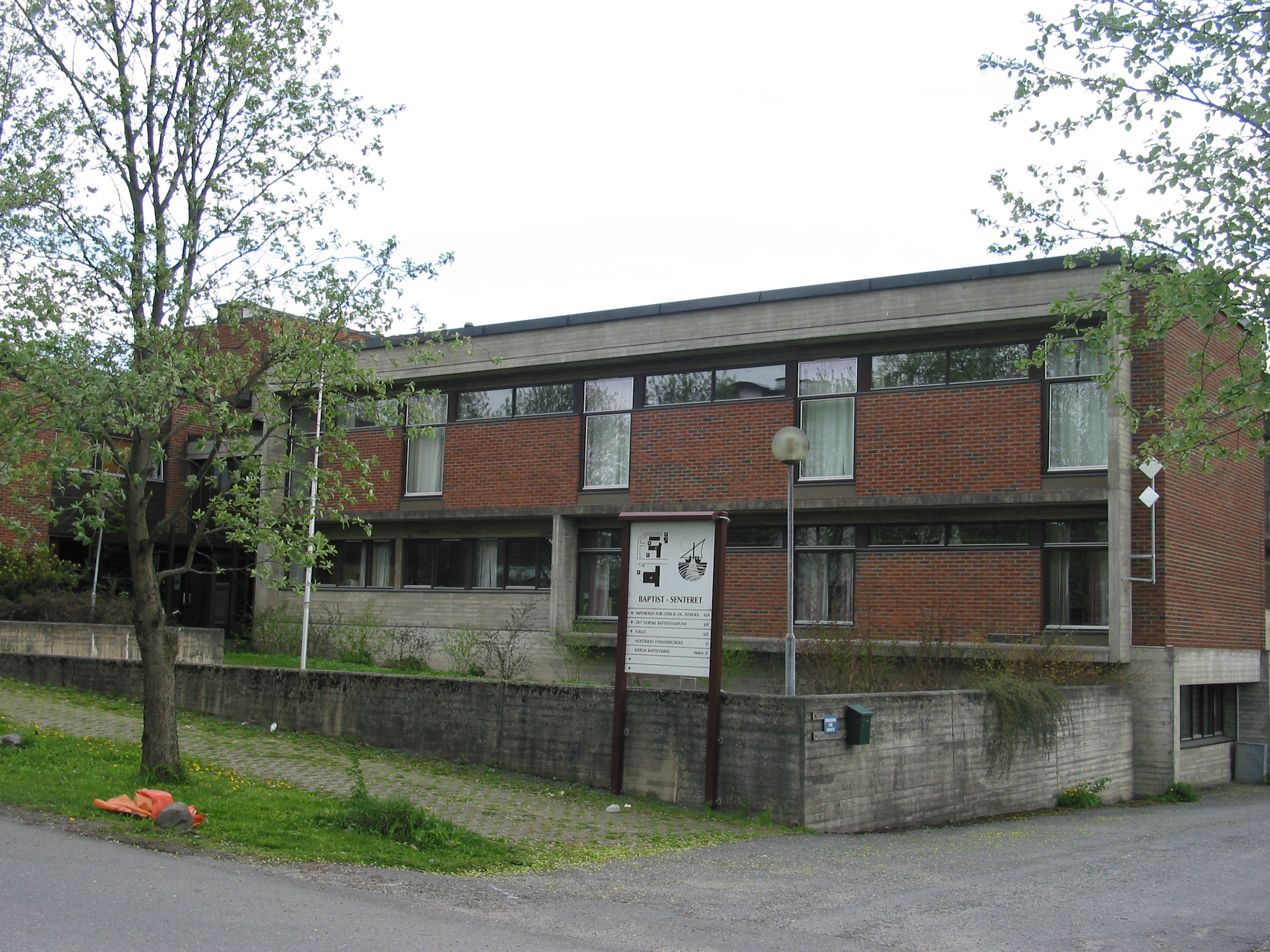

Location
- Stabekk, Bærum; Norway
- Coordinates: 59°54′11″N 10°36′17″E

Information
- Established: 2008; 18 years ago 1910; 116 years ago as Norwegian Baptist Seminary
- Website: nslt.org (English) hlt.no} (Norwegian)

The Norwegian School of Leadership and Theology (Norwegian: Høyskolen for Ledelse og Teologi, HLT) is a theological seminary situated at Stabekk in Bærum, Norway. The institution is jointly owned by the Baptist Union of Norway and Filadelfia Oslo, a Pentecostal congregation.

== History ==
The school has its origins in the founding of the Norwegian Baptist Seminary in 1910. The college was established in 2008 as a merger between the Norwegian Baptist Seminary and the Pentecostal Center for Leadership and Theology. The institution took over the accreditation of the Baptist seminary as well as its premises. It offers a bachelor's degree in theology and a one-year program in Christianity, accredited by the Norwegian Agency for Quality Assurance in Education.
