= Baptist Union of Norway =

Baptist Christian denomination in Norway

- Det Norske Baptistsamfunn
- Classification: Evangelical Christianity
- Theology: Baptist
- Chairman: Per Øvergaard
- Secretary-general: Terje Aadne
- Associations: Baptist World Alliance; European Baptist Federation; Christian Council of Norway
- Headquarters: Stabekk, Norway
- Origin: 1879
- Congregations: 105
- Members: 10,657 (2022)
- Official website: baptist.no

The Baptist Union of Norway (Norwegian: Det Norske Baptistsamfunn) is a Baptist Christian denomination in Norway. It is affiliated with the Baptist World Alliance. The headquarters is in Stabekk.

== History ==
=== First congregations ===
The first Baptist in Norway was Enok Richard Haftorsen Svee. Raised in a Haugianer family in Orkanger, he moved to Copenhagen in 1837 to attend missionary training. There he came into contact with a group of unorganized Baptists and participated in the founding of Denmark's first Baptist congregation the following year. This was illegal at the time. Svee returned to Orkanger in 1842 and died a year later, never establishing a congregation in Norway.

The Parliament of Norway passed the Dissenter Act on 16 July 1845, allowing Christian congregations outside the Church of Norway to be established. The Swedish Baptist Fredrik Olaus Nilsson visited Norway several times from 1851, but his preaching was futile. Instead the Danish preacher Fredrik L. Rymker from Odense was successful at establishing a congregation. The Danish community dispatched him to Norway to preach. He arrived in Skien on 21 September 1857 and started preaching in the various free churches there. He also travelled around to neighboring towns. Carl Gundersen Kongerød became the first Baptist baptized in Norway, on 25 December 1858. By 22 April 1860 there were nine Baptists in the area and the Baptist congregation in Porsgrunn and Solum was founded.

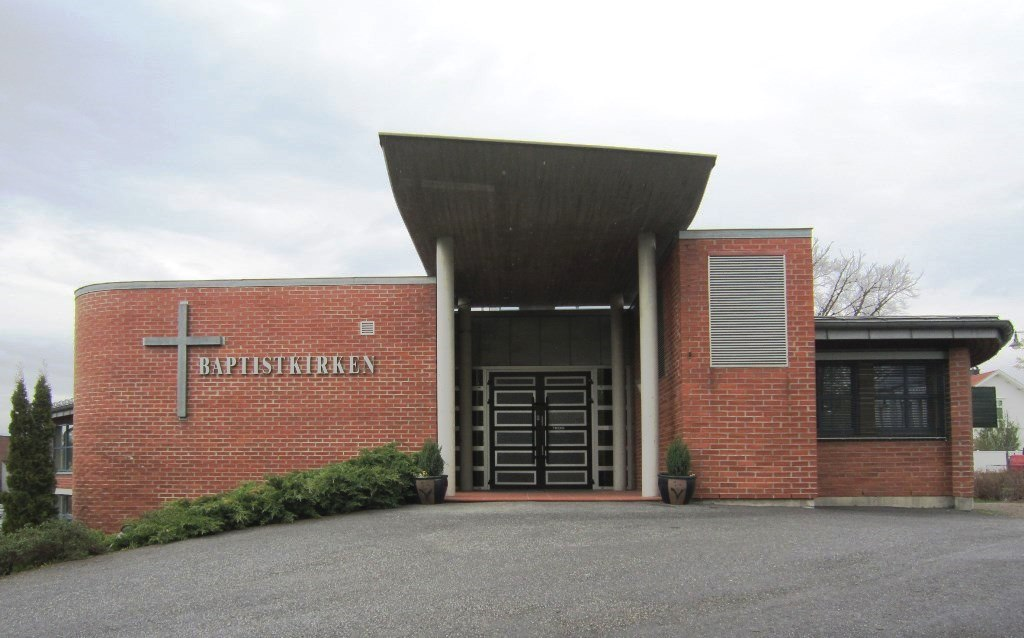
Skien Baptist Church.

Rymker continued to travel and preach until 1862, funded through grants from congregations in the United States. He helped establish Larvik Baptist Congregation on 14 November 1860 and Kragerø Baptist Congregation on 31 August 1862. A congregation of baptists in Levanger was founded in 1862. New preachers arrived in Norway and the cause spread throughout the 1860s. Eidsvoll Baptist Congregation was founded on 29 August 1864 and in Melum on 25 December 1865. Additional congregations were founded in Arendal presumably on 14 August 1867, followed by Bergen, Tromsø and Tvedestrand in 1870. Two years later congregations were established in the towns of Langesund, Risør and Trondheim.

Focus shifted to the capital Kristiania (today Oslo). The Swedish pastor Sven Svensson visited the city, funded by the Baptist Missionary Society (BMS) and helped incorporate a congregation in 1874. It became the subject of personal conflicts and part of the congregation split in favor of the Adventist Church, and the organization was disestablished in 1880. It was reestablished in 1884 and within a decade had become the largest Baptist congregation in the country.

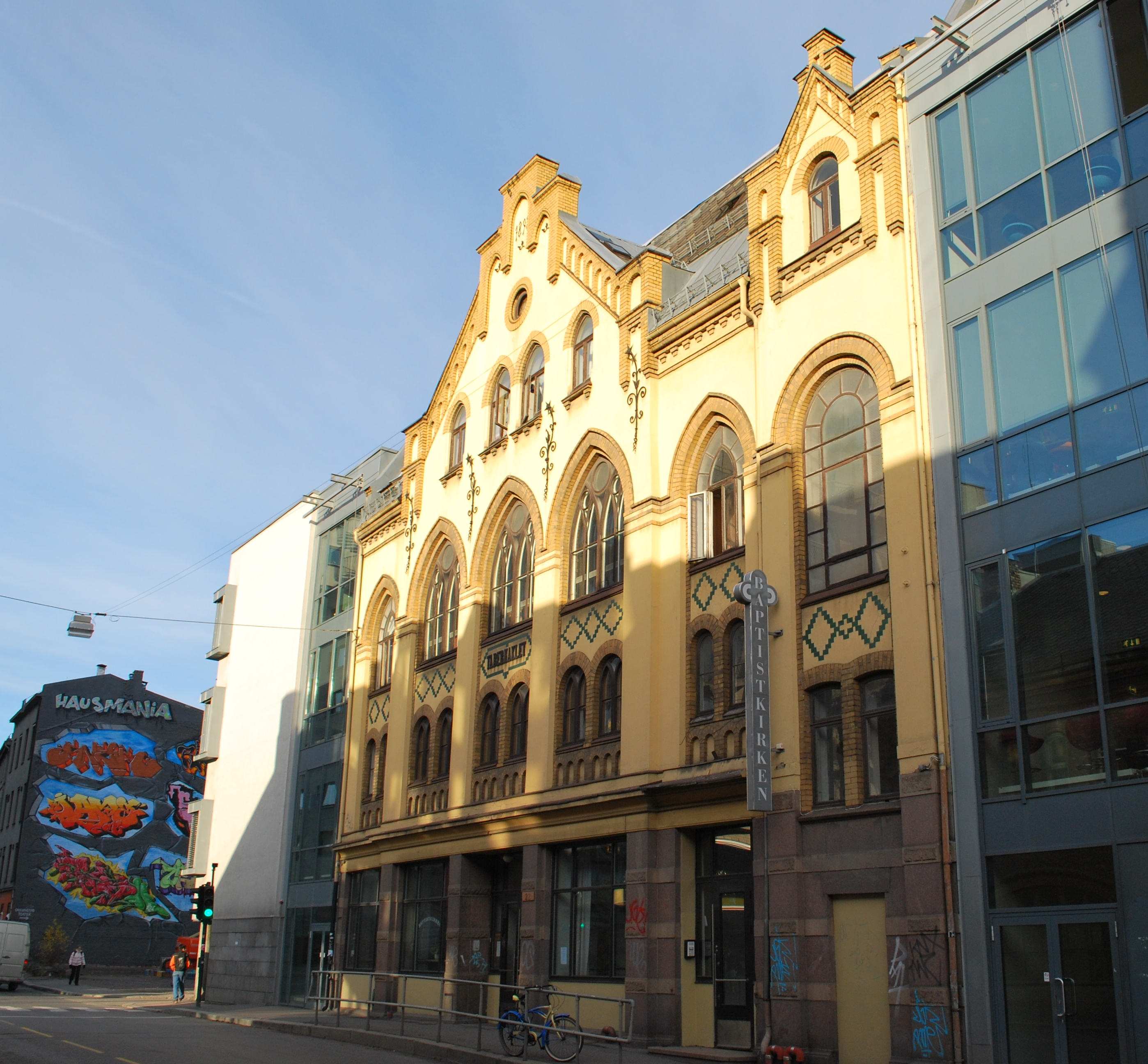
Oslo First Baptist Church

All the congregations were established as independent denominations under the protection that the Dissenter Act provided, even if they could have as few as six members. Following a movement inspired by the United States, there was a trend towards weak congregationalism. This established a common understanding of the legal and organizational independence of each congregation, while retaining the need for a national administrative and theological coordination. By the early 1870s the congregations in Skien, Bergen, Trondheim and Tromsø had largely taken on regional responsibilities and covered areas far exceeding the city limits.

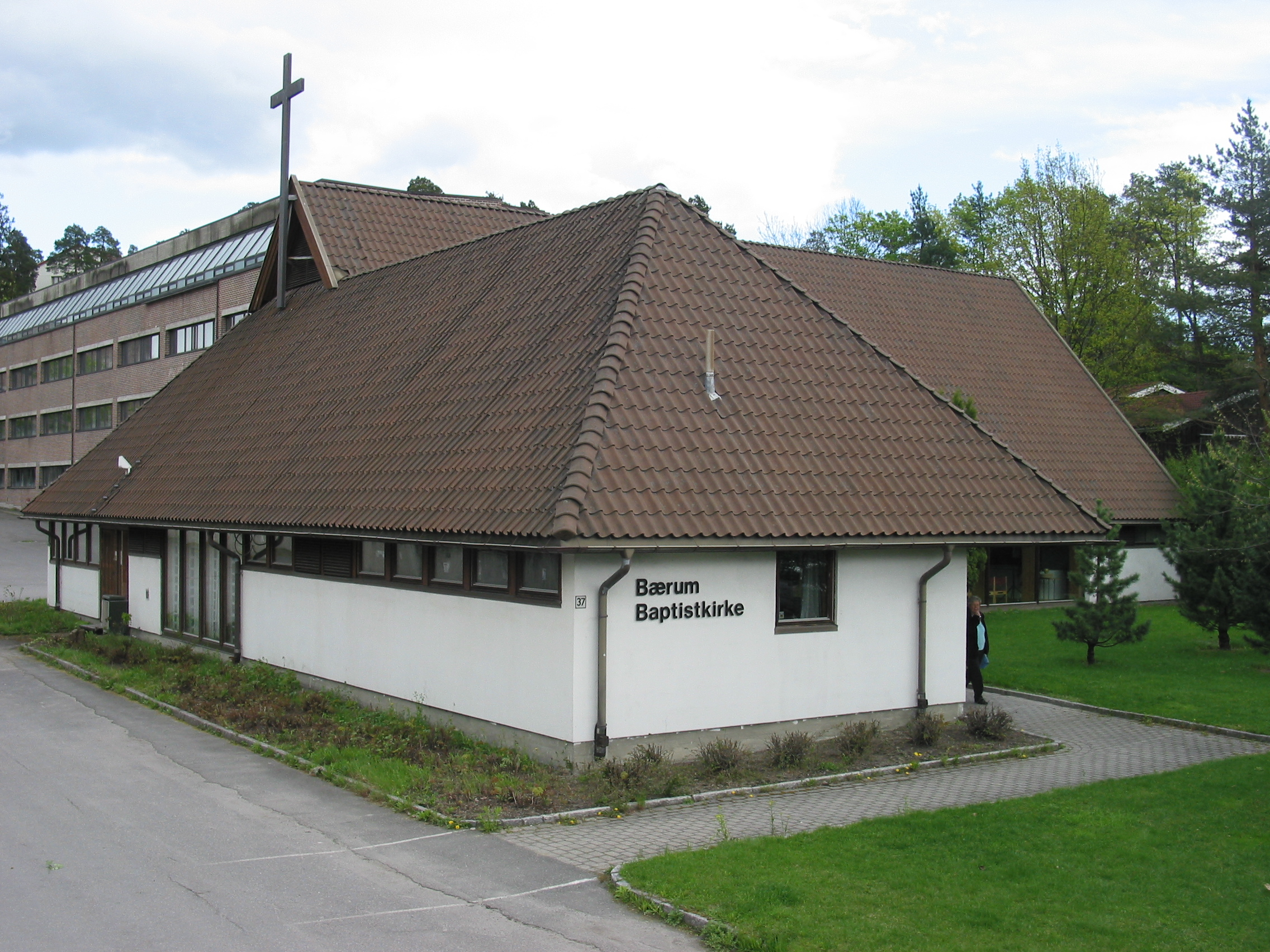
The Baptist church in Bærum

=== Establishing the union ===
The Sønnenfjellske District Association was founded in 1872 as a cooperative body in Eastern Norway. Tromsø Missionary Society was founded in 1877. It originally was a subset of the Tromsø congregation, but was soon joined by newly established congregations in Northern Norway. The same year the congregations in Trondheim and Bergen established Vestenfjellske Missionary Society. These were responsible for inter-congregational coordination and activities, especially evangelism.

The first national conference took place on 6 to 8 July 1877 in Bergen, with ten delegates from five congregations. For the first time the number of Baptists were calculated, totaling 511 at the end of 1867. The main organization outcome was the establishment of a committee to establish a common Sunday school curriculum. The following year a meeting was held in Bergen with most of the pastors in the country. BMS attended with a representative, Edward Bean Underhill. An agreement was made whereby a national union would be established and receive financial support from BMS. Another outcome of the meeting was the foundation of Adelfia, an association for the pastors.

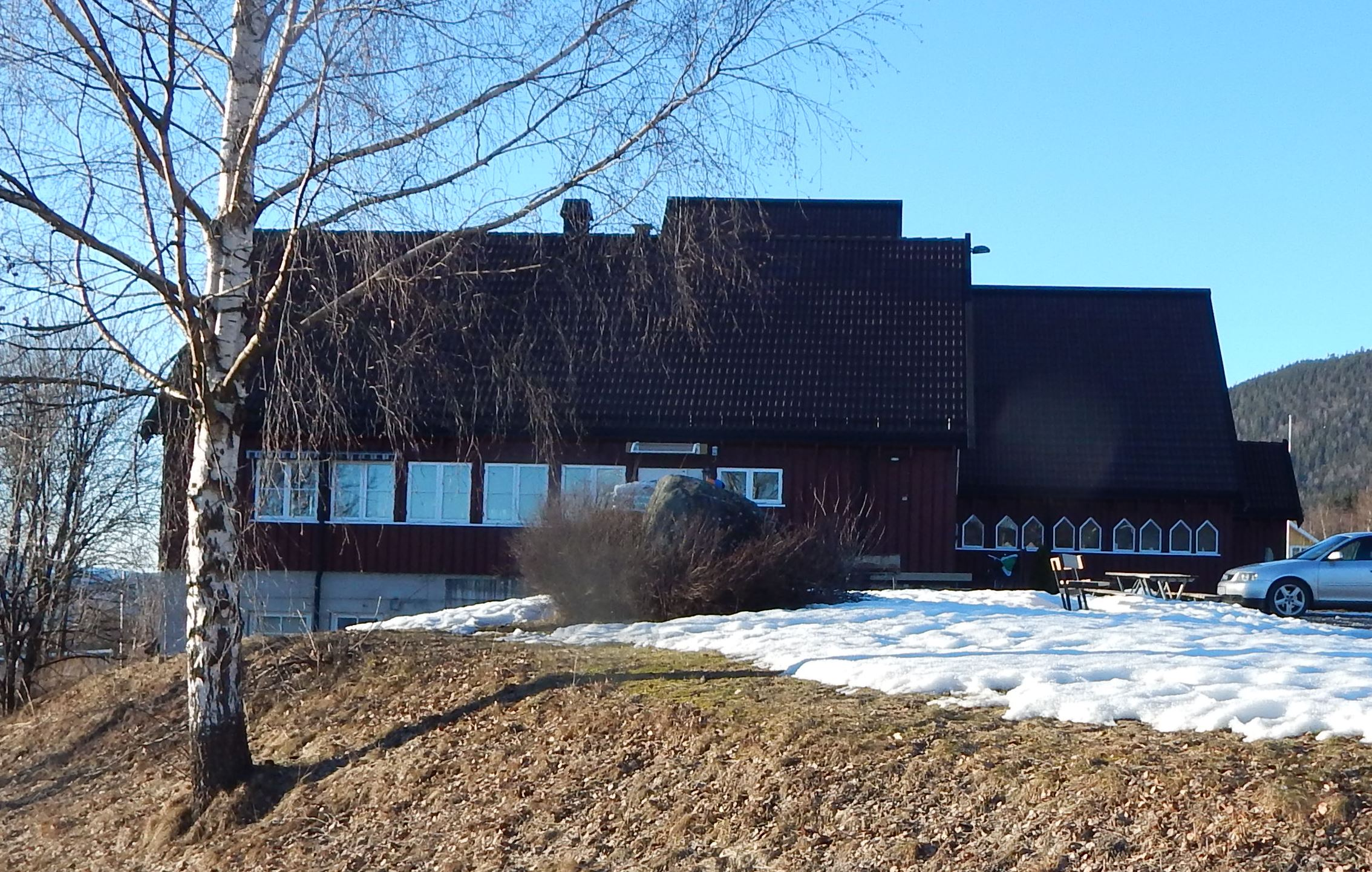
The Baptist church in Lillehammer.

The formal decision to establish the Baptist Union of Norway was taken at the second national conference, held in Trondheim the following year. Thirteen delegates from eight congregations participated. Nine congregations joined the union; the remaining six refrained either because they were not represented at the conference or because they were feared the union would interfere in congregational affairs. Janne M. Sjödahl was appointed the union's first chairman.

It was officially founded in 1879.

The first inter-congregational bulletin was Palmebladet, first published by G. Hübert in 1879. Three years later the hymnal Salmer og Sang was published. Adelfia began publishing the national newsletter Unions-Banneret in 1880. These initiatives led to the union establishing a publishing office, Den evangeliske Bok & Traktatforening.

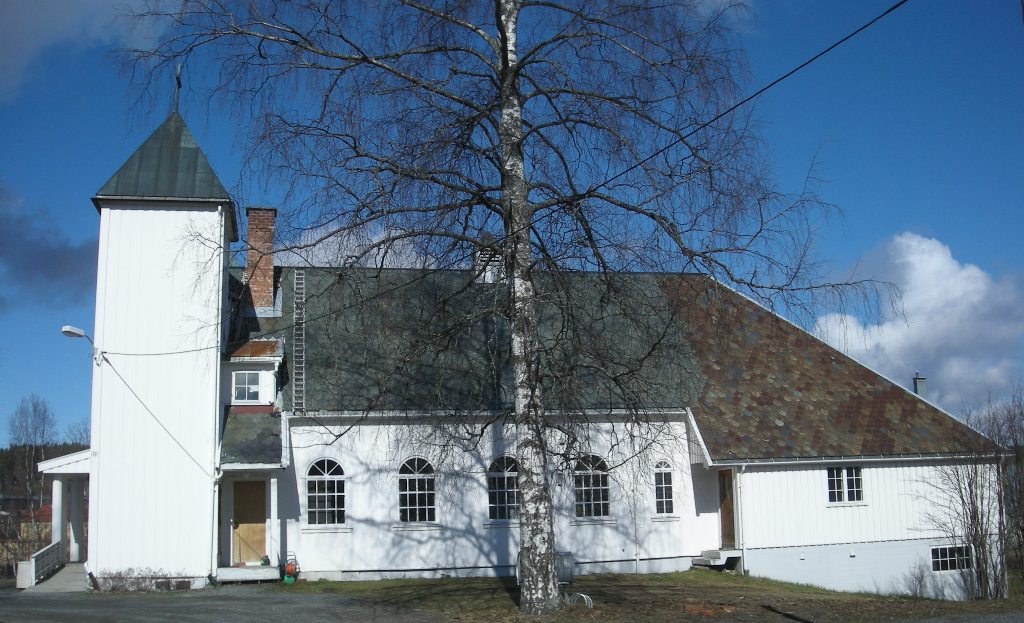
Raufoss Baptist Church

The Baptist communities in Norway enjoyed close relations with BMS in England and Scandinavian expatriate congregations in the United States through the American Baptist Missionary Union (ABMU). The latter was mostly concentrated in Minnesota. After first establishing a common Scandinavian seminary, it split and a Norwegian–Danish seminary was established in the Chicago community of Morgan Park as part of the Baptist Union Theological Seminary (later to become the University of Chicago Divinity School). This remained the main point of contact with the American Baptist community. Forty-two Norwegians attended the seminary from 1884 to 1910.

The establishment of the seminary caused a close connection between the Norwegian Baptist congregations and that of the Midwestern United States; it was the source of new inspiration. A major step took place in 1885 when pastors began to be ordained. The number of Baptist congregations reached eighteen in 1886, although the membership growth was significantly steeper with 1,335 members that year. Ten years later it had increased to 26 congregations and 2,132 members. It reached 35 congregations and 2,900 members in 1902.

BMS announced in 1890 that it would withdraw all financial support for work in Norway starting in 1892. They cited that Norway no longer was seen as a missionary site, and that recruitment had leveled off. They also argued that the congregations should have the capacity to fund their own operations. The Baptist Union of Norway therefore contacted the Norwegian expatriate community. ABMU offered support to the union on the condition the Norwegians would preach in line with the American organization's theology and that Norwegian international missionaries would represent ABMU.

=== Establishment of institutions ===
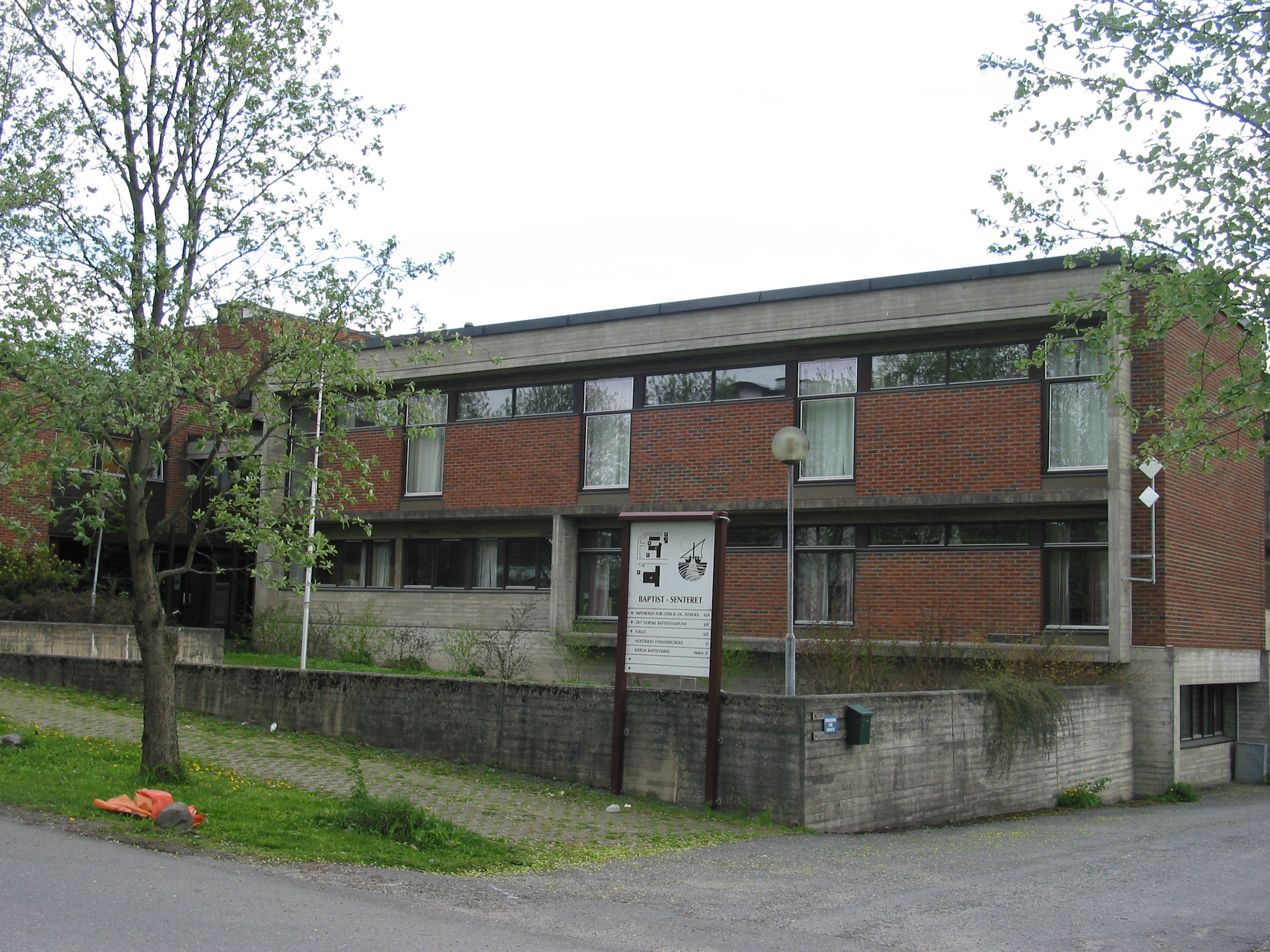
The Norwegian Baptist Seminary, now the Norwegian School of Leadership and Theology, was founded in 1910

The Baptist Union of Norway became a founding member of the Baptist World Alliance in 1905 and J. A. Øhrn became an inaugural vice president. The Norwegian Baptist Theological Seminary was founded in 1910, allowing both pastors and missionaries to be educated domestically for the first time. Olaf J. Øie was hired as the first rector, a role he held until his death in 1943. The seminary soon offered a bachelor-level degree.

A separate Norwegian mission was founded at the annual conference in 1915. Fundraising secured Bernhard Ålbu's travel to the Belgian Congo. This was the first time that Norwegian Baptist missionaries traveled without being under the auspices of the ABMU. Due to the First World War he was not able to travel until 1918. The effort was concentrated in the Bas-Uele District, especially in the settlements of Bili and Monga. The network was gradually expanded and by the 1970s there were additional missionary stations in Bondo, Butu, Likati and Ndu. By 1945 the Congo mission had baptized 3,000 converts.

The Baptist Women's Association of Norway was founded in 1916 to coordinate women's work between the congregations. This included both evangelism and missions, as well as annual seminars. The Baptist Youth Association was founded in 1922 to coordinate the activities of the youth associations in each congregation. From 1921 the local congregation operated a fishermen's home in Honningsvåg. Another attempt to spread the word in Northern Norway took place through the "skerries mission". Boats were used to reach coastal hamlets without regular church services.

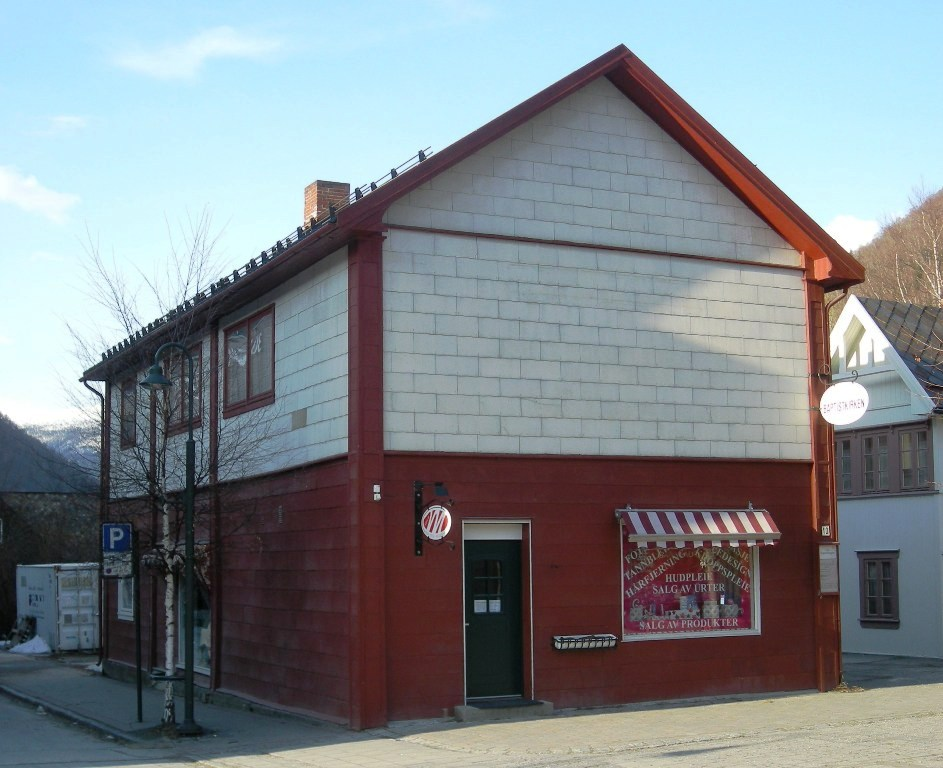
Sel Baptist Church in Otta

The organization saw its membership hit a plateau during the 1900s, but then saw significant growth again during the 1910s. Membership numbers grew again during the 1930s and hit an all-time high of 7,500 members in the late 1940s. By then Pentecostalism was increasing in Norway. Many Baptists changed to Pentecostal congregations and locally there was often competition for the same congregants. Similarities in theological stances, especially regarding baptism and congregationalism, often eased the transition between congregations.

Along with the Baptist Union of Denmark and the Baptist Union of Sweden, the Norwegian union established a congregation in San Francisco, the Scandinavian Seamen Mission in 1946. Two Norwegians have been secretary-general of the Baptist World Alliance. The first was Arnold T. Øhrn from 1948 to 1960, and his successor Josef Nordenhang from 1960 to 1969. The Baptist Folk High School was inaugurated in 1958. It changed its name to Holtekilen Folk High School in 1979.

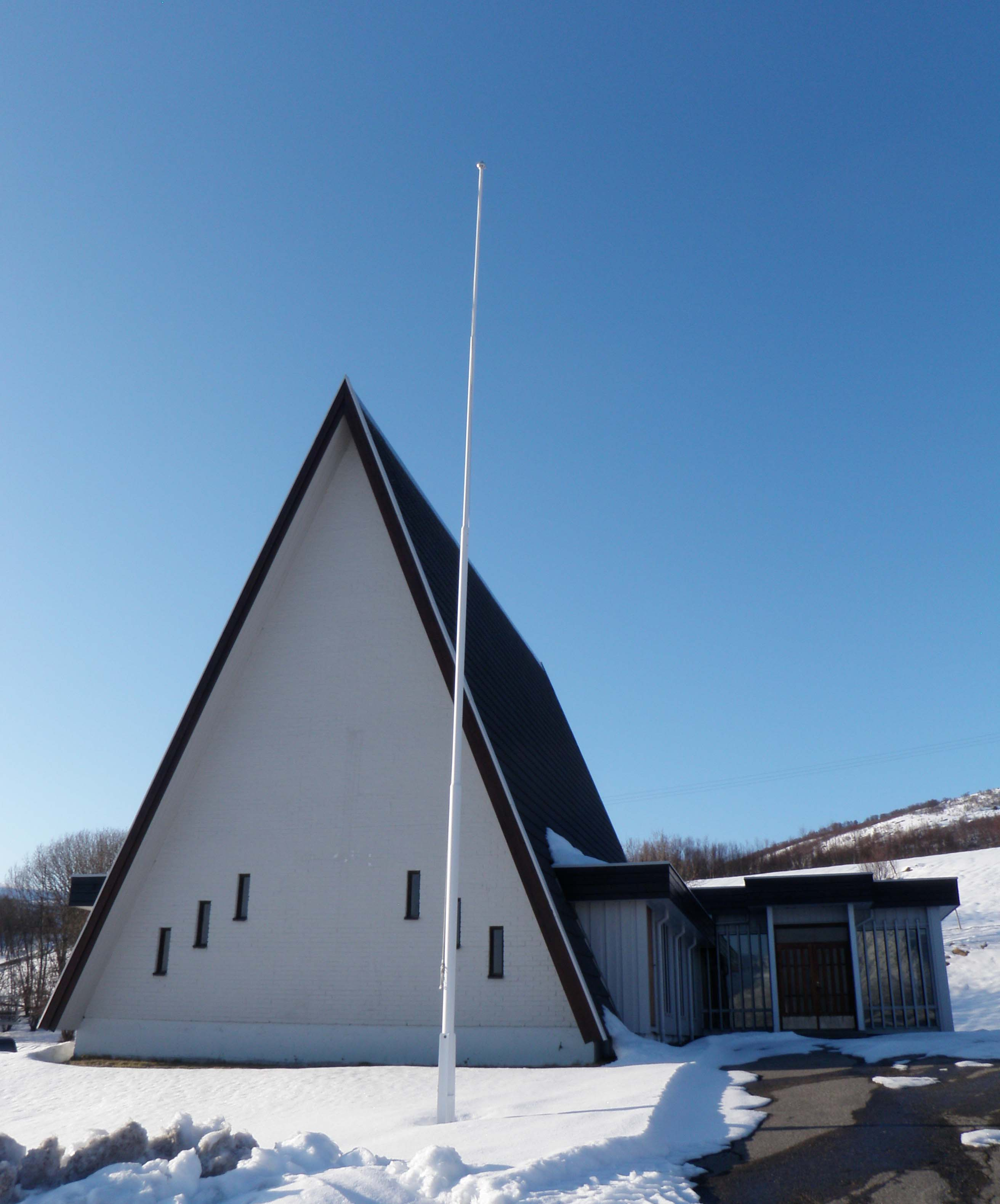
Åse Baptist Church in Andenes

Many of the smallest congregations had problems funding both a church and the pastor's wages. In some congregations this was solved by only hiring the pastor part-time, or having them funded through their spouse working. In any case wages were comparatively low for the education. From the 1960s a "wage fund" was created, whereby larger congregations subsidized the wages of pastors in smaller congregations. The Baptist Study Council was established in 1972 to publish study circles. This agency remained until 2010. The missionary activity was expanded from 1984, when the annual conference voted to allow mission to other countries than Zaïre.

Oppdal Baptist Congregation left the union in 1986. During the mid-1980s the union experienced major economic problems and a large deficit. The congress of the European Baptist Federation was hosted in Lillehammer in 1994, with the union as the organizer. Four thousand delegates participated at the event at Håkons Hall. The union launched its website on 19 February 1996. Banneret was reorganized in 2004 and changed from a weekly newspaper to a monthly magazine. It took the name Baptist.no in 2009.

Oslo Third Baptist Congregation was excluded from the union in 2006 after it had elected a member living in a same-sex partnership to its board. After decades with stagnating membership, the Baptist community experienced rising membership numbers and increasing number of congregations from the late 2000s. The Norwegian Baptist Seminary was reorganized in 2008. It merged with the Pentecostal Center for Leadership and Theology to form the Norwegian School of Leadership and Theology. It was accredited as a college and was situated at the Baptist complex at Stabekk.

== Organization ==
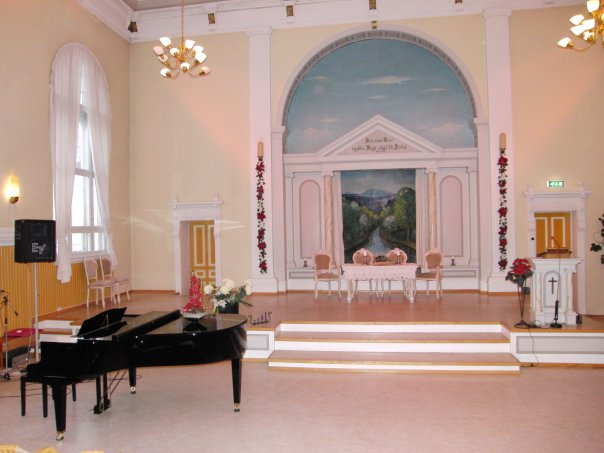
Interior of Trondheim Baptist Church

The union has 97 congregations. Membership is tied to the individual congregations rather than to the union. Based on a form of weak congregationalism, these are autonomous organizations which elect their own leadership. The union therefore acts as a coordinating organization. The congregations are organized into five regional districts, each with their own board. The union has an annual meeting with delegates from each congregation. This body holds the supreme authorities within the union. It appoints the main board, other committees and various issues regarding economy, institutions and plans.

The head office is situated at Stabekk in Bærum Municipality outside Oslo. The union has an administration with seven employees, led by Secretary-General Terje Aadne. The Baptist Union of Norway is a member of the Baptist World Alliance, the European Baptist Federation and the Christian Council of Norway.

== Membership ==
Statistics Norway counted 10,283 members of the Baptist Union of Norway in 2014. This is based on the official reported numbers of adherents to the state for state grants. This number includes children and non-baptized adherents.

According to a census published by the association in 2023, it claimed 103 churches and 6,651 members.

== Institutions ==
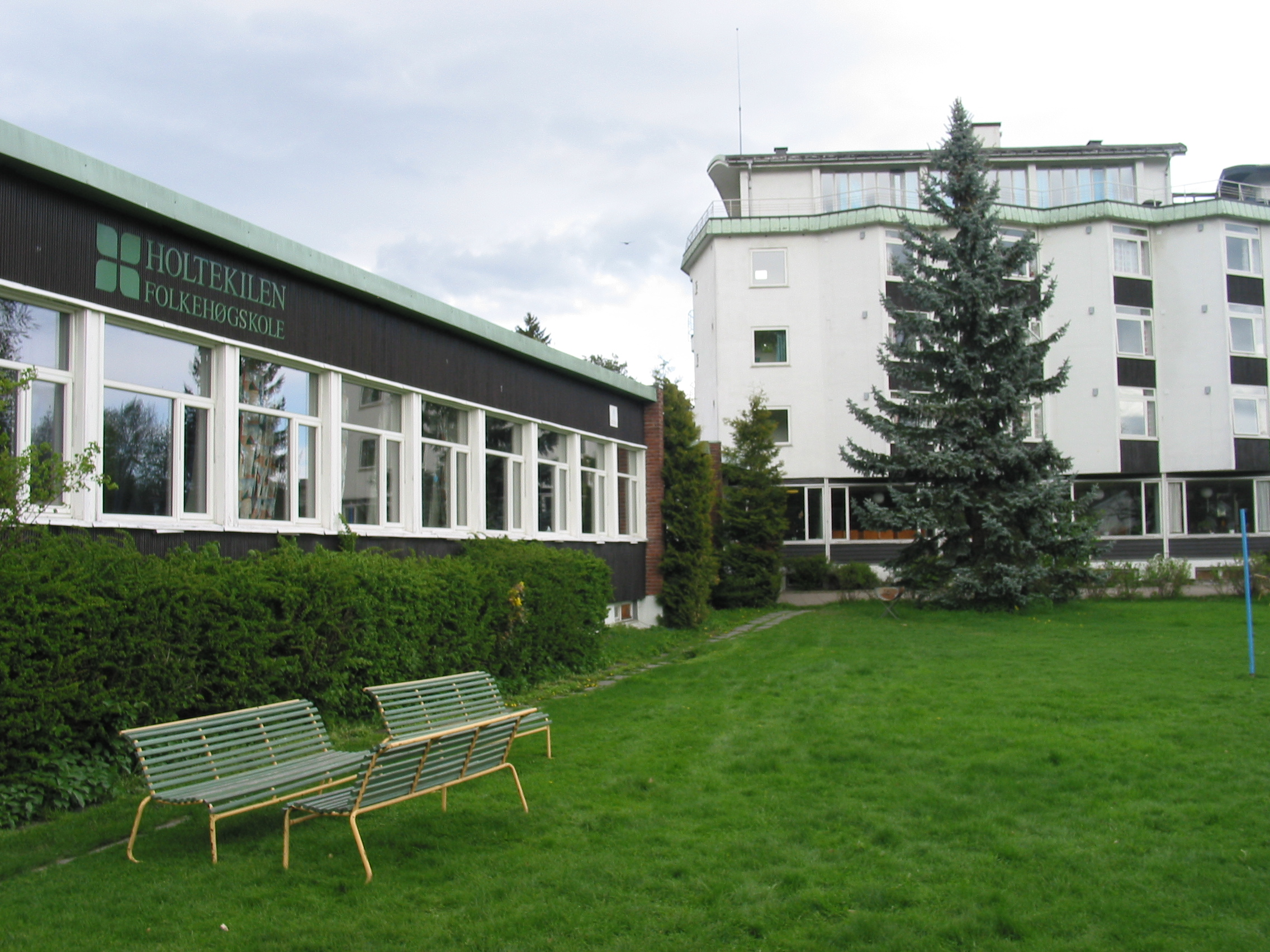
Holtekilen Folk High School in Bærum Municipality is owned by the union

The Norwegian School of Leadership and Theology is an accredited college jointly owned by the Baptist Union and Filadelfia Oslo, a Pentecostal congregation. Approved by the Norwegian Agency for Quality Assurance in Education, it offers a three-year bachelor's degree in leadership and theology, and a one-year course in Christianity. Although not a formal requirement, most pastors have taken a four-year theological education at the college.

Holtekilen Folk High School is situated at Stabekk and has 85 pupils. It features six tracks: music, fashion/design, travel, film/photography, street sociology and ethics/sustainability.

The union publishes a monthly magazine, Baptist.no, which is distributed to all members of the congregations. The Norwegian Baptist Historical Society is given the task of maintaining Baptist archives in Norway and publishing historical and theological presentations. Its main work is the semi-annual magazine Baptist which provides articles on Baptist history, theology and practice. It also publishes literature.

== Bibliography ==
- Eidberg, Peder A. (1976). Baptistene – tro og liv (in Norwegian). Oslo: Norsk Litteraturselskap.
- Eidberg, Peder A. (1998). Det folk som kalles baptister (in Norwegian). Oslo: University of Oslo.
- Liland, Ola; Iversen, Frithjov (2010). Norges baptister 150 år (in Norwegian). Norsk Lutteraturselskap. ISBN 978-82-510-0385-8.
