= Roald S. Næss =

Norwegian diplomat

Roald Sturla Næss (born 26 April 1949) is a Norwegian diplomat.

He holds the cand.mag. degree and worked briefly as a journalist in Aftenposten before he started working for the Norwegian Ministry of Foreign Affairs in 1981. He served as counsellor at the Norwegian delegation in Geneva before serving as senior adviser in the Ministry of Foreign Affairs between 2003 and 2007. Between 2005 and 2006 he presided over the Nuclear Suppliers Group. He then became an ambassador, to Iran from 2007 to 2011 and Ireland from 2011.

He resides at Stabekk.
