= Stabekk =

- Neighbourhood
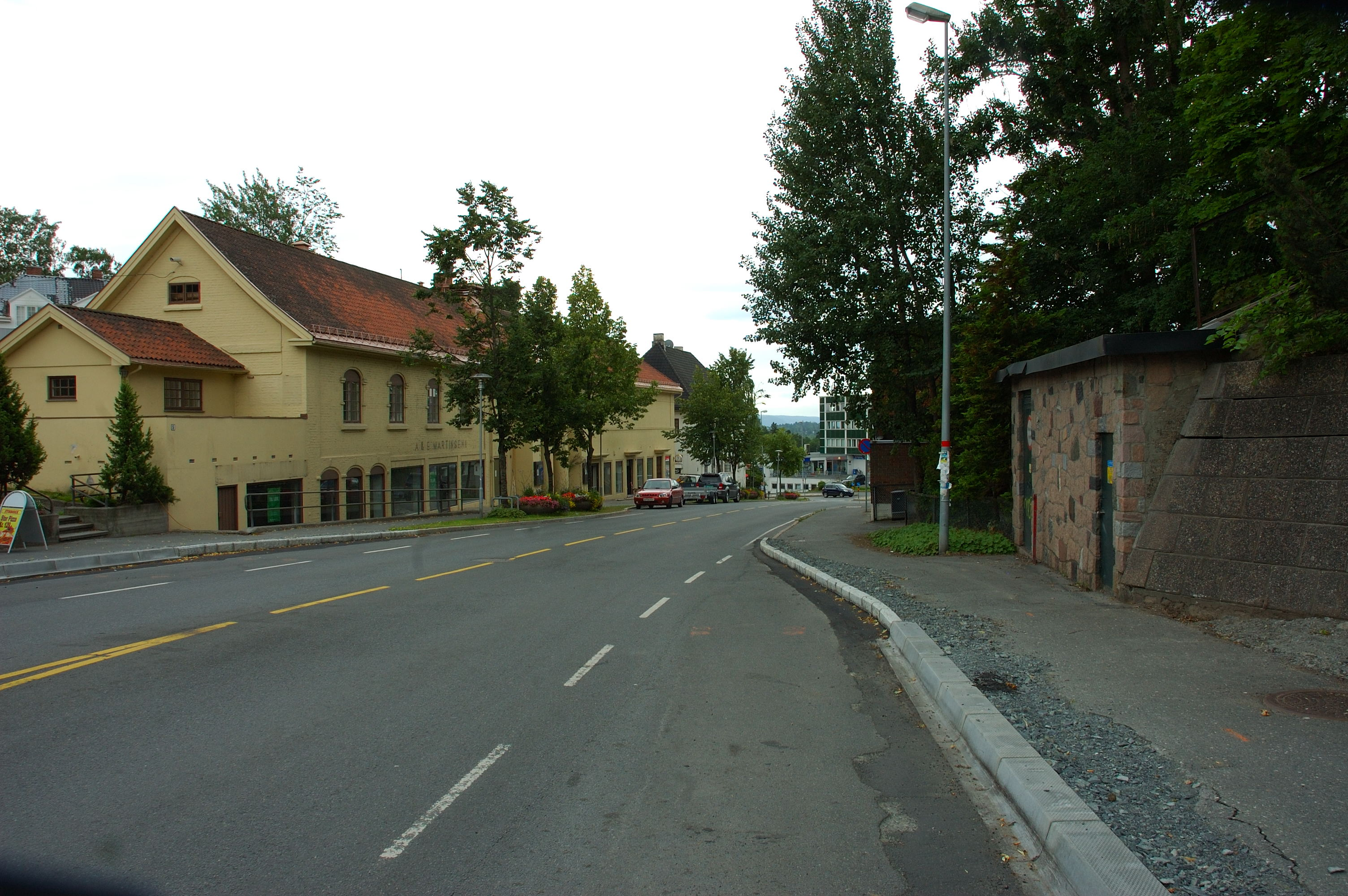
- Upper Stabekk

- Location within Akershus Location within Norway
- Coordinates: 59°54.516′N 10°36.216′E
- Country: Norway
- County: Akershus
- Municipality: Bærum

Population (2005)
  - Total: 6,261
- Postal code: 1368

Stabekk is a suburban centre in the municipality of Bærum, Norway, west of Oslo. It is predominantly a residential area, with many residents commuting to Oslo. As of 2005 the population was 6,261.

Bærum has the highest income per capita and the highest proportion of university-educated individuals in Norway. It is one of Norway's priciest and most fashionable residential areas, leading residents to be frequently stereotyped as snobs in Norwegian popular culture. The area has some of the most conservative populace in Norway

Stabekk has a commercial district, roughly divided into Øvre (Upper) Stabekk and Nedre (Lower) Stabekk, separated by a hill. There are a number of retail shops in both these sections as well as a commuter railway station served by Drammenbanen. Stabekk also has a bandy field, a primary school, an upper-secondary school, a cinema, and a tennis club.

The campus of the Norwegian Teachers College for Home Economics is on the architectural registry .

The football team Stabæk I.F. originates from Stabekk, the name Stabæk being an archaic spelling, but the team has since relocated to Bekkestua. The bandy team of Stabæk I.F. is among the best in Norway. Stabekk Håndball is playing in the top-division in Norwegian Handball - Grundigligaen.

== Notable people ==
Notable people that were born or lived in Stabekk include:

- Jo Benkow (1924–2013), former president of the Norwegian parliament and Høyre leader (conservative party)
- Christian C. A. Lange (1810–1861), historian
- Ernst Sejersted Selmer (1920 – 2006), mathematician
- Roald S. Næss (born 1949), diplomat

== Gallery ==
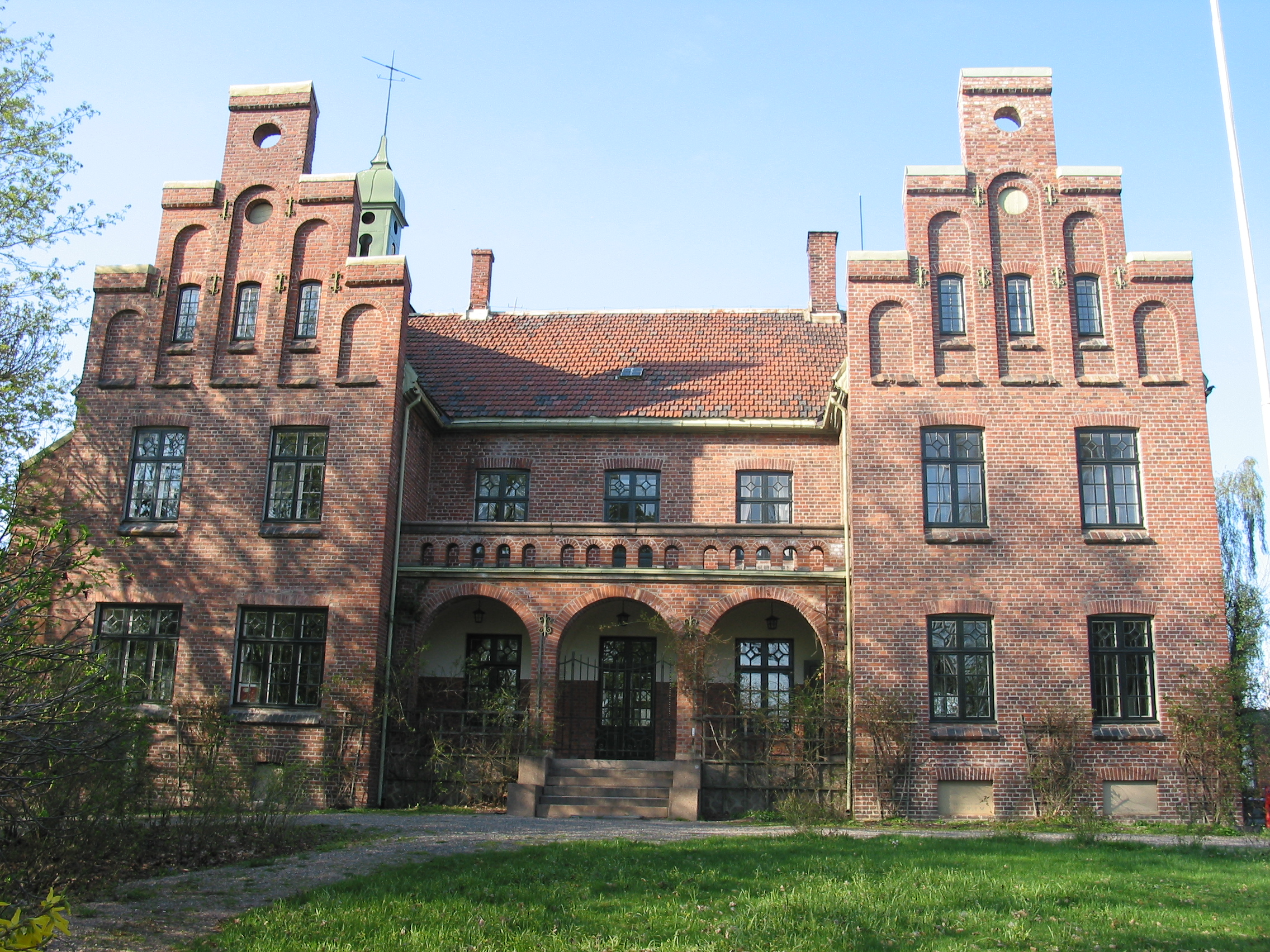
Stabekk Castle

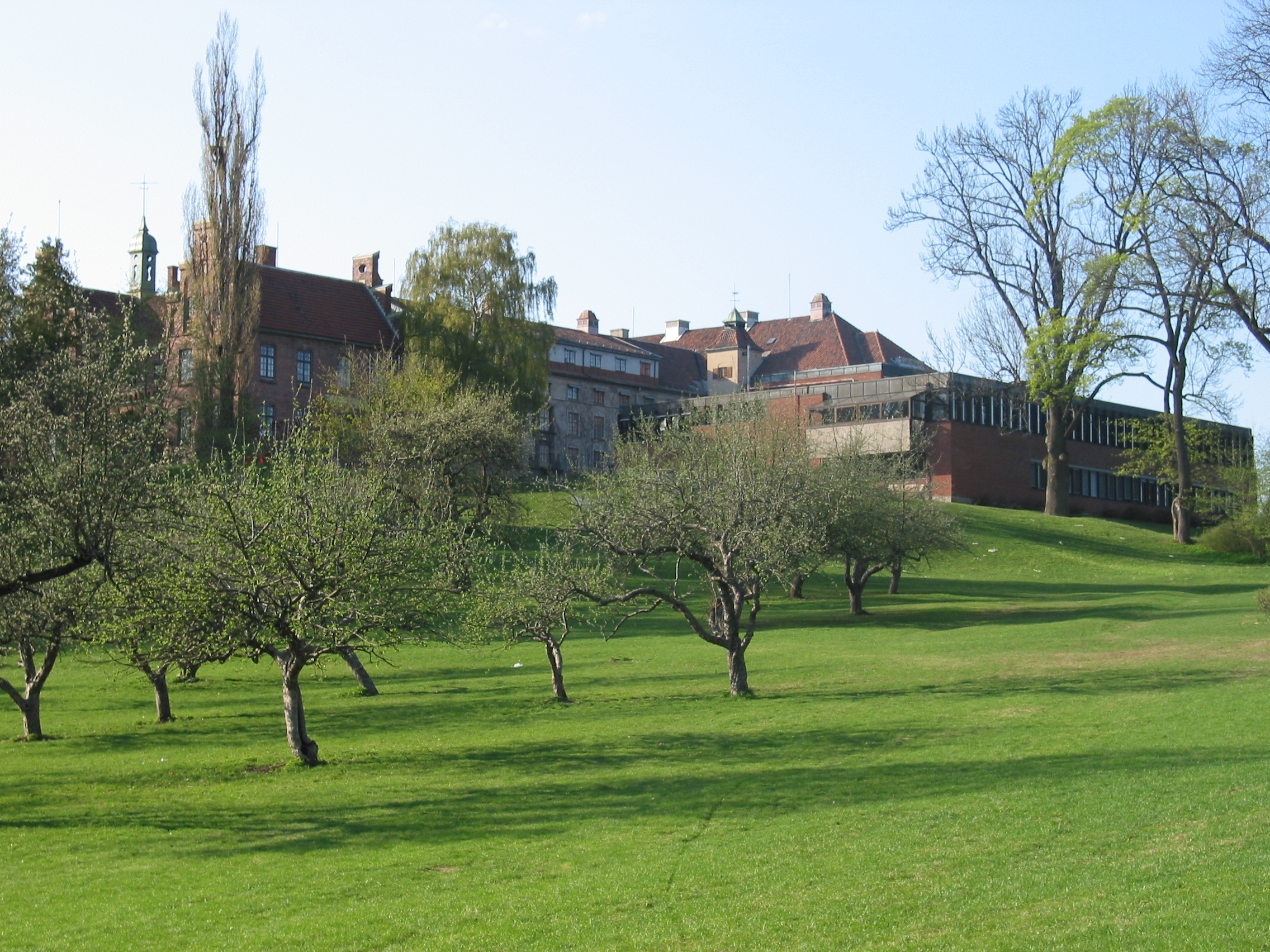
Upper Stabekk

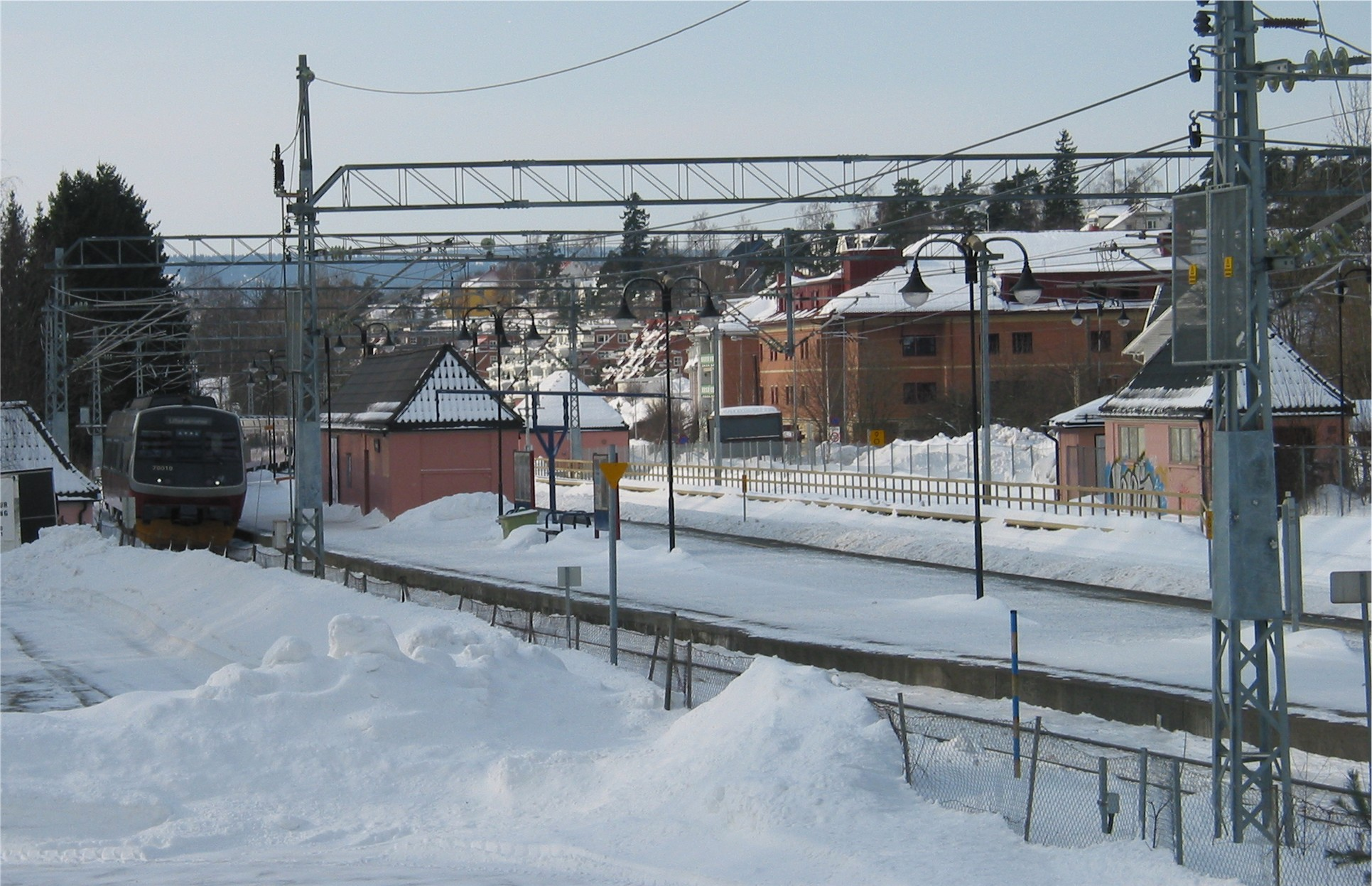
Stabekk railway station

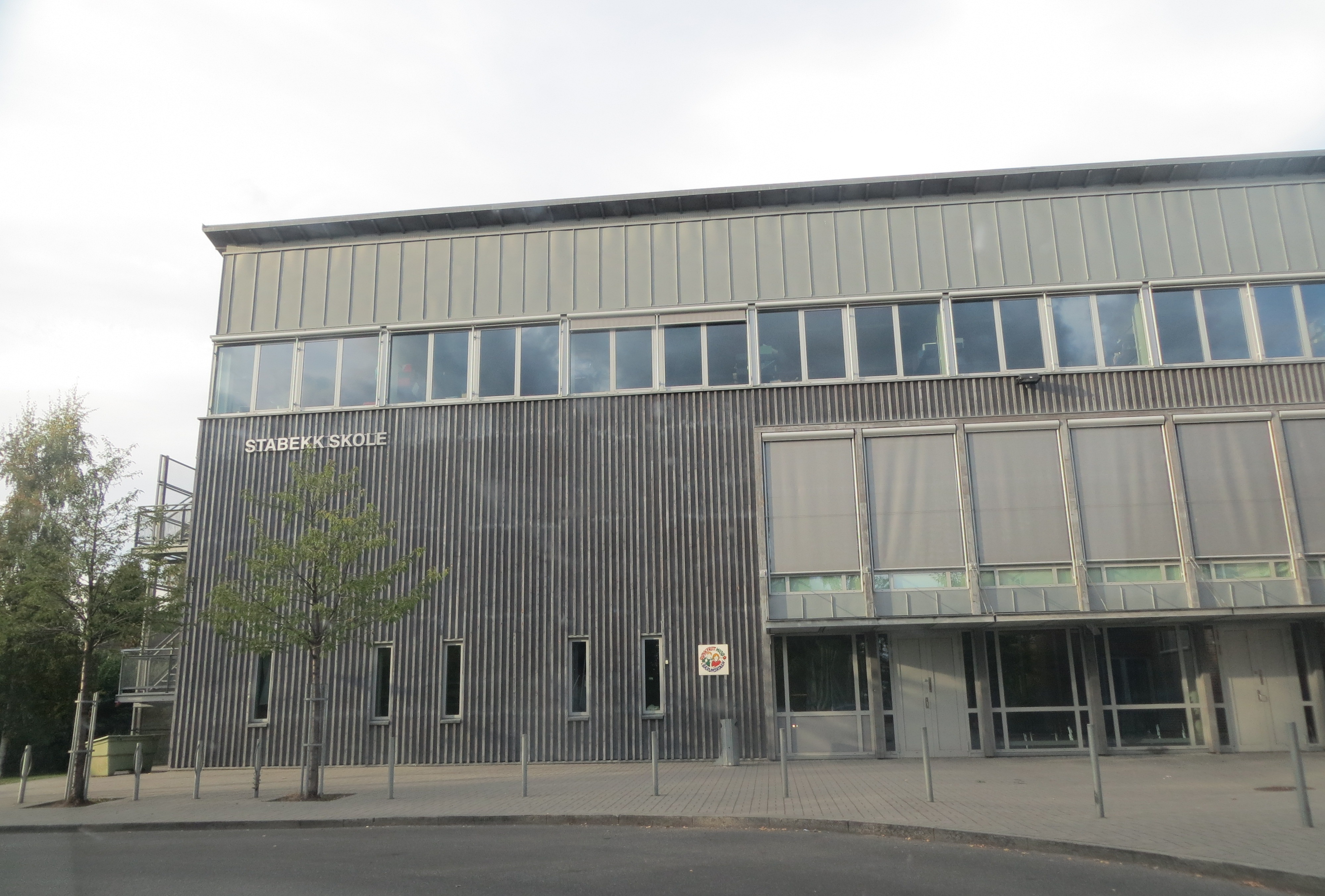
Stabekk Primary School

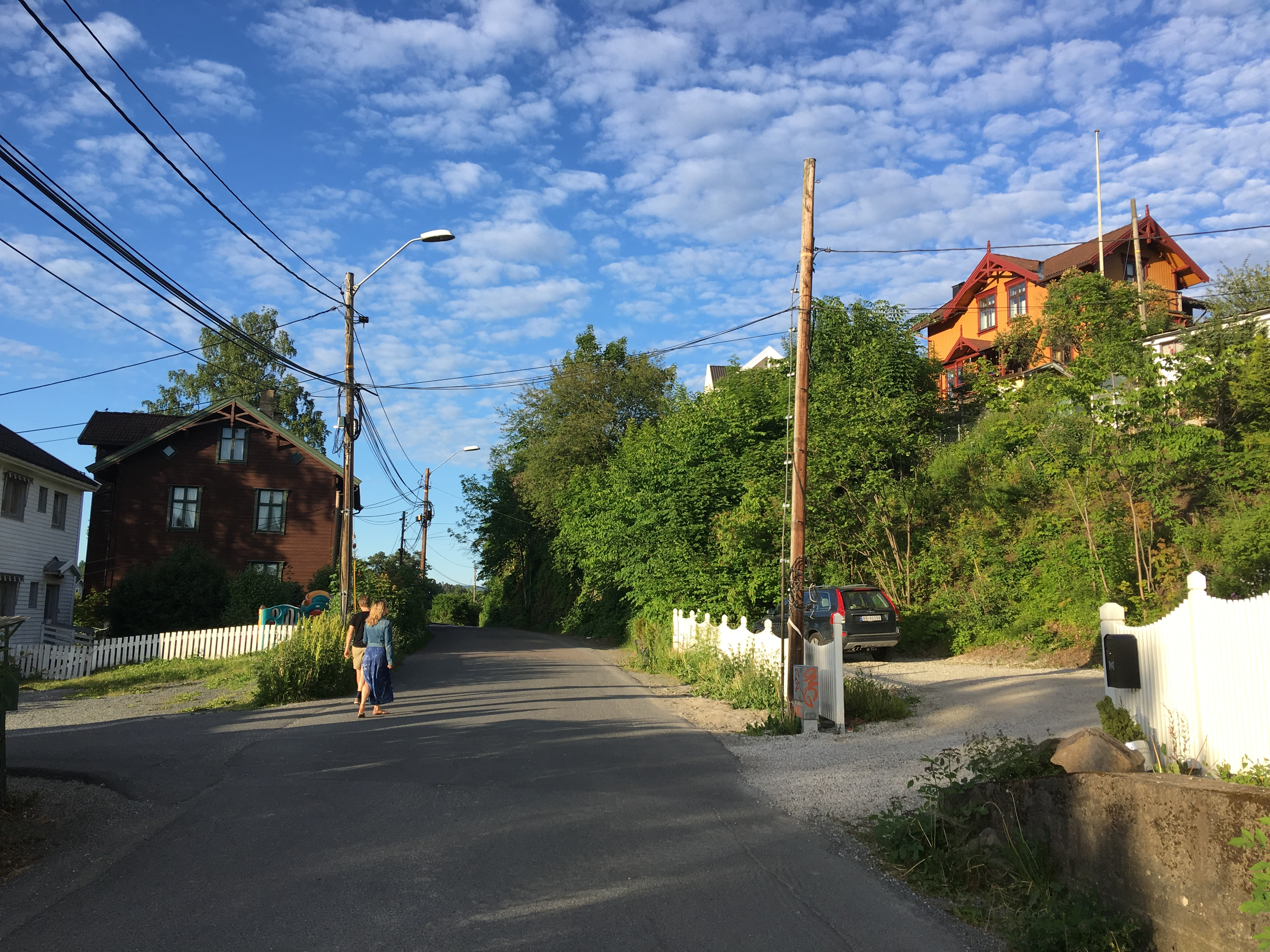
Street in Stabekk

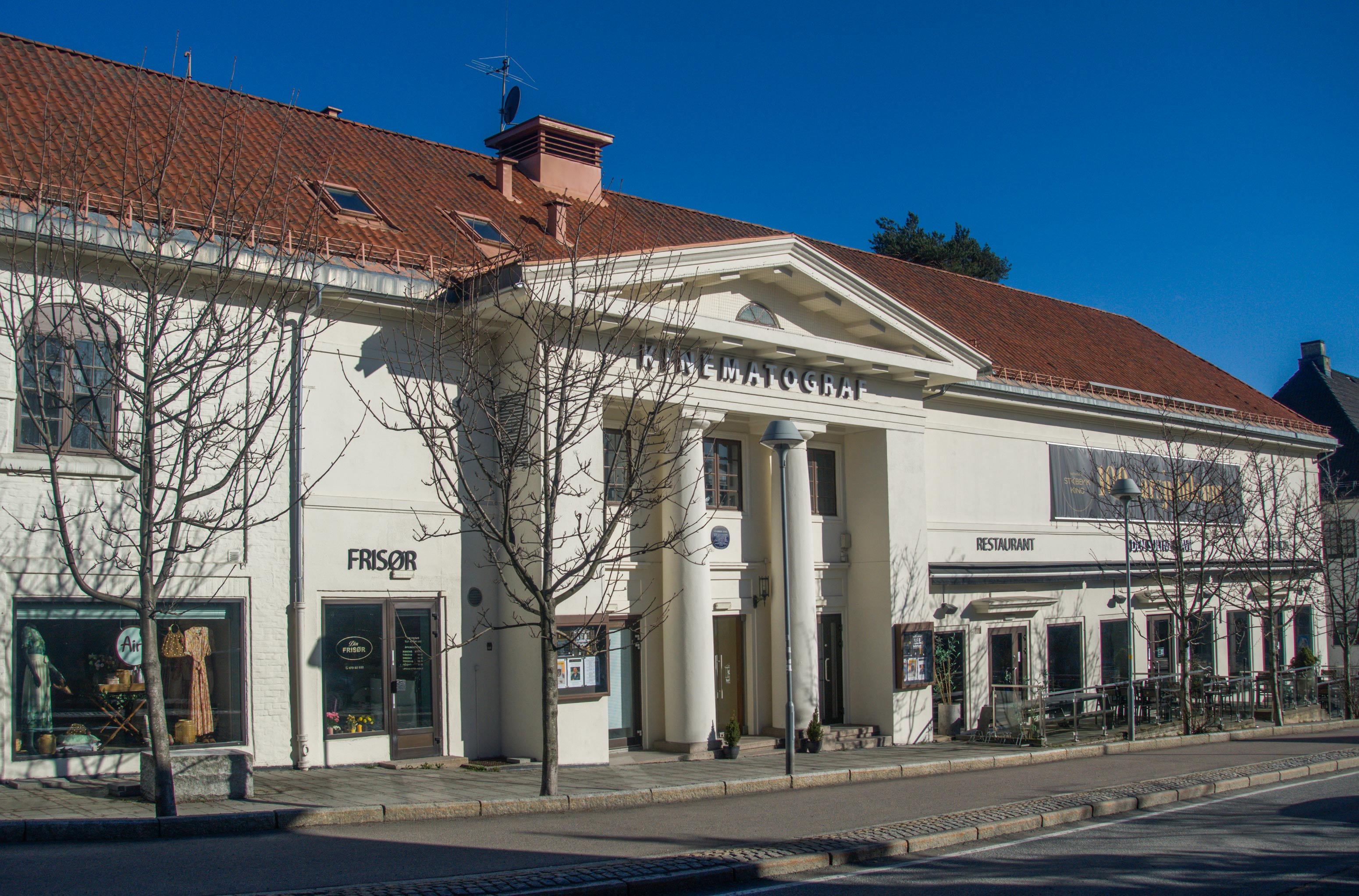
Stabekk Kino entrance
