= List of songs recorded by Living Sacrifice =

This is a list of songs written, recorded, and performed by Living Sacrifice, in order of each release:

Not Yielding to Ungodly

- Haven of Blasphemy
- Second Death
- Progressive Change

Living Sacrifice

- Violence
- Internal Unrest
- Second Death
- Obstruction
- Walls of Separation
- Phargx Imas
- No Grave Concern
- Dealing with Ignorance
- Prodigal
- Anorexia Spiritual

Nonexistent

- Emerge
- Enthroned
- Nonexistent
- Haven Of Blasphemy
- ...To Nothing
- Void Expression
- Atonement
- Distorted
- Chemical Straightjacket
- Without Distinction

Metamorphosis

- Void Expression
- Black Veil
- Distorted
- Desolate
- Sacrificed

Inhabit

- In the Shadow
- Not Beneath
- Sorrow Banished
- Unseen
- Inhabit
- Breathing Murder
- Mind Distant
- Darkened
- Indwelling
- Departure

Reborn

- Reborn Empowered
- Truth Solution
- Threatened
- Awakening
- 180
- No Longer
- Something More
- Sellout
- Spirit Fall
- Presence Of God
- Reject
- Liar

The Hammering Process

- Flatline
- Bloodwork
- Not My Own
- Local Vengeance Killing
- Altered Life
- Hand Of The Dead
- Burn The End
- Hidden
- Perfect
- Conditional
- New Day (unreleased)

Conceived In Fire

- Imminent War
- Symbiotic
- 3x3 We Carried Your Body
- The Poisoning
- Send Your Regrets
- Subtle Alliance
- Into Again
- Separation
- Black Seeds
- Ignite
- Distrust
- The Martyr
- Reach For The Sky

In Memoriam

- In Christ
- Power Of God
- Killers
- Enthroned '98

Death Machine

- Death Machine
- The Battle

The Infinite Order

- Overkill Exposure
- Rules of Engagement
- Nietzsche's Madness
- Unfit to Live
- The Training
- Organized Lie
- The Reckoning
- Love Forgives
- They Were One
- God Is My Home
- Apostasy
- Of My Flesh, Of My Heart
- Glasshouses
- Flatline (live)
- Symbiotic (live)

Ghost Thief

- Screwtape
- Ghost Thief
- The Reaping
- Straw Man
- Sudden
- Mask
- American Made
- Before
- Your War
- Despair

Other Songs

- Overkill Exposure (Rough Mix)
- Something More (Re-Recorded Version)

== Credits ==
- Bruce Fitzhugh - Rhythm Guitar on releases 1-13, Vocals on releases 5-13
- Lance Garvin - Drums on releases 1-13, Percussion on releases 9-13
- Rocky Gray - Lead Guitar on releases 6-13
- Arthur Green - Bass on releases 6-13
- Jason Truby - Lead Guitar on releases 1-5
- Chris Truby - Bass on releases 5
- D.J. Johnson - Bass on releases 1-4, Vocals on releases 1-4
- Matt Putman - Additional Percussion on releases 6-7
