= 34th GMA Dove Awards =

2003 US music awards ceremony

- Date: April 10, 2003
- Location: Gaylord Entertainment Center, Nashville, Tennessee
- Hosted by: CeCe Winans and Steven Curtis Chapman

Television/radio coverage
- Network: PAX TV

The 34th Annual GMA Dove Awards were held on April 10, 2003, recognizing accomplishments of musicians for the year 2002. The show was held at the Gaylord Entertainment Center in Nashville, Tennessee, and was hosted by CeCe Winans and Steven Curtis Chapman.

The 34th Annual Dove Awards were broadcast on April 19, 2003, on PAX TV. The Trinity Broadcasting Network also rebroadcast the awards show.

== Performers ==
- Blind Boys of Alabama
- Big Daddy Weave
- Mark Schultz
- Bebo Norman
- Nicole Nordeman
- Rock n Roll Worship Circus
- Souljahz
- Daily Planet
- Cece Winans
- Audio Adrenaline
- Paul Coleman Trio
- Jeff Deyo
- The Crabb Family
- Amy Grant & Vince Gill
- Joy Williams & Ashley Cleveland
- Yolanda Adams & Donnie McClurkin
- Sixpence None the Richer
- Michael W. Smith & Friends

== Award recipients ==
=== Song of the Year ===
==== Winner ====
- “Holy”; Nichole Nordeman, Mark Hammond; Ariose Music, Mark Hammond Music (ASCAP)

==== Nominees ====
1. "Above All"; Lenny LeBlanc, Paul Baloche; Integrity's Hosanna!Music, Len Songs Publishing (ASCAP)
2. "Back in His Arms Again"; Mark Schultz; Mark Schultz Music (BMI)
3. "Breathe"; Marie Barnett; Mercy/Vineyard Publishing (ASCAP)
4. "Come Unto Me"; Nicole C. Mullen; Wordspring Music/Lil'Jas Music (SESAC)
5. "Great Light of the World"; Bebo Norman; NewSpring Pub. Inc, Appstreet Music (ASCAP)
6. "Here I Am To Worship"; Tim Hughes; Kingsway's Thankyou Music (PRS)
7. "Holy"; Nichole Nordeman, Mark Hammond; Ariose Music, Mark Hammond Music (ASCAP)
8. "Ocean Floor"; Mark Stuart, Bob Herdman, Tyler Burkum, Will McGinnis, Ben Cissell; Up in the Mix Music (ASCAP) (BMI)
9. "Spoken For"; Bart Millard, Nathan Cochran, Mike Scheuchzer, Robby Shaffer, Jim Bryson, Peter Kipley; Simpleville, Wordspring Music, Songs from the Indigo Room (ASCAP) (SESAC)
10. "Yes, I Believe"; Joel Lindsey, Tony Wood; Paragon Music/Vacation Boy Music/New Spring Publishing (ASCAP)
11. "Youth of the Nation"; P.O.D. (Traa, Sonny, Marcos, Wuv) Paul Sandoval, Marco Curiel, Mark Traa, Noah Bernardo; Souljah Music/Famous Music Publishing (ASCAP)

=== Songwriter of the Year ===
==== Winner ====
- Nichole Nordeman

==== Nominees ====
1. Bebo Norman
2. Lenny LeBlanc
3. Nichole Nordeman
4. Paul Baloche
5. Tim Hughes

=== Male Vocalist of the Year ===
==== Winner ====
- Michael W. Smith

==== Nominee ====
1. Bebo Norman
2. Mac Powell
3. Mark Schultz
4. Michael W. Smith
5. Steven Curtis Chapman

=== Female Vocalist of the Year ===
==== Winner ====
- Nichole Nordeman

==== Nominees ====
1. Joy Williams
2. Natalie Grant
3. Nichole Nordeman
4. Nicole C. Mullen
5. Rebecca St. James

=== Group of the Year ===
==== Winner ====
- Third Day

==== Nominees ====
1. Audio Adrenaline
2. MercyMe
3. Selah
4. Sixpence None the Richer
5. Third Day

=== Artist of the Year ===
==== Winner ====
- Michael W. Smith

==== Nominees ====
1. MercyMe
2. Michael W. Smith
3. Steven Curtis Chapman
4. Third Day
5. tobyMac

=== New Artist of the Year ===
==== Winner ====
- Paul Colman Trio

==== Nominees ====
1. Big Daddy Weave
2. Daily Planet
3. Jeff Deyo
4. Paul Colman Trio
5. Souljahz
6. The Rock 'N' Roll Worship Circus

=== Producer of the Year ===
==== Winner ====
- Brown Bannister

==== Nominees ====
1. Brown Bannister
2. Charlie Peacock
3. Monroe Jones
4. Nathan Nockels
5. Steve Hindalong

=== Rap/Hip Hop/Dance Recorded Song of the Year ===
==== Winner ====
- “All Around The World”; Fault Is History; Souljahz; Joshua Washington, Je’kob Washington & Rachael Washington, Chris Rodriquez; Warner Brothers

==== Nominees ====
1. "All Around The World"; Fault Is History; Souljahz; Joshua Washington, Je'kob Washington & Rachael Washington, Chris Rodriquez; Warner Brothers
2. "Amazing"; Exodus; Andy Hunter; Andy Hunter, Tedd T., Ray Goudie; Sparrow
3. "Here We Go"; The Art Of Translation; GRITS; Teron Carter, Stacy Jones, Otto Price, Ric Robbins; Gotee
4. "Irene"; Momentum; tobyMac; Toby McKeehan, Randall Crawford, Jeff Savage; ForeFront
5. "J-Train"; Momentum; tobyMac with Kirk Franklin; Toby McKeehan, Jeff Savage, Randall Crawford; ForeFront

=== Modern Rock/Alternative Recorded Song of the Year ===
==== Winner ====
- “Breathe Your Name”; Divine Discontent; Sixpence None the Richer; Matt Slocum; Reprise

==== Nominees ====
1. "Blood Of Jesus"; Welcome to the Rock 'N' Roll Worship Circus; The Rock 'N' Roll Worship Circus; Gabriel Wilson, Blurr, Solo, Zurn, Mike Greeley, Mark Nelson, Terry Nelson; Vertical
2. "Breathe Your Name"; Divine Discontent; Sixpence None the Richer; Matt Slocum; Reprise
3. "Get This Party Started"; Momentum; tobyMac; Toby McKeehan, Pete Stewart, Michael-Anthony Taylor; ForeFront
4. "Our Love Is Loud"; Can You Hear Us?; David Crowder Band; David Crowder; sixstepsrecords
5. "Revolution"; The Eleventh Hour; Jars of Clay; Dan Haseltine, Charlie Lowell, Stephen Mason, Matt Odmark; Essential
6. "Spin"; Stanley Climbfall; Lifehouse; Jason Wade, Ron Aniello; Sparrow

=== Hard Music Recorded Song of the Year ===
==== Winner ====
- “Boom”; Satellite; P.O.D.; P.O.D. (Traa, Sonny, Marcos, Wuv) Paul Sandoval, Marco Curiel, Mark Traa, Noah Bernardo; Atlantic

==== Nominees ====
1. "Boom"; Satellite; P.O.D.; P.O.D. (Traa, Sonny, Marcos, Wuv) Paul Sandoval, Marcos Curiel, Mark Traa, Noah Bernardo; Atlantic
2. "Electric"; Out of My Mind; gs megaphone; Ben Shreve; Spindust
3. "Fireproof"; Fireproof; Pillar; Rob Beckley, Michael Wittig, Brad Noone, Noah Henson; Flicker USA
4. "Symbiotic"; Conceived in Fire; Living Sacrifice; Rocky Gray, Arthur Green, Bruce Fitzhugh, Matthew Putman, Lance Garvin; Solid State
5. "Tonight"; Engage; PAX217; Josh Auer, Jesse Craig, Aaron Tosti, Dave Tosti, Joey Marchiano, Bobby Duran; ForeFront
6. "Vapor"; Alien Youth; Skillet; John L. Cooper; Ardent

=== Rock Recorded Song of the Year ===
==== Winner ====
- “40 Days”; Come Together; Third Day; Mac Powell, Brad Avery, David Carr, Mark Lee, Tai Anderson; Essential

==== Nominees ====
1. "40 Days"; Come Together; Third Day; Mac Powell, Brad Avery, David Carr, Mark Lee, Tai Anderson; Essential
2. "Broken"; 12 Stones; 12 Stones; Paul McCoy, Eric Weaver, Kevin Dorr, Aaron Gainer; Wind Up
3. "Get On"; Come Together; Third Day; Mac Powell, Brad Avery, David Carr, Mark Lee, Tai Anderson; Essential
4. "Speaking in Tongues"; Truth, Soul, Rock & Roll; The Elms; Owen Thomas; Sparrow
5. "Tangled Web"; Hero; Daily Planet; Jesse Butterworth, Reggie Hamm; Reunion

=== Pop/Contemporary Recorded Song of the Year ===
==== Winner ====
- “Holy”; Woven & Spun; Nichole Nordeman; Nichole Nordeman, Mark Hammond; Sparrow

==== Nominees ====
1. "Back in His Arms Again"; Song Cinema; Mark Schultz; Mark Schultz; Word
2. "Great Light of the World"; Myself When I Am Real; Bebo Norman; Bebo Norman; Essential
3. "Holy"; Woven & Spun; Nichole Nordeman; Nichole Nordeman, Mark Hammond; Sparrow
4. "Love Someone Like Me"; Love Someone Like Me; Patty Cabrera; Patty Cabrera; Patrona Productions
5. "Ocean Floor"; Lift; Audio Adrenaline; Mark Stuart, Will McGinniss, Bob Herdman, Tyler Burkum, Ben Cissell; ForeFront

=== Inspirational Recorded Song of the Year ===
==== Winner ====
- “Here I Am To Worship”; Here I Am To Worship; Tim Hughes; Tim Hughes; Worship Together

==== Nominees ====
1. "Before It Was Said"; Have I Ever Told You; FFH; Michael Boggs, Jeromy Deibler, David Hamilton; Essential
2. "Come Unto Me"; Talk About It; Nicole C. Mullen; Nicole C. Mullen; Word
3. "Here I Am To Worship"; Here I Am To Worship; Tim Hughes; Tim Hughes; Worship Together
4. "Purified"; Worship; Michael W. Smith; Michael W. Smith, Deborah D. Smith; Reunion
5. "Who You Are"; Walk On; 4Him; Mark Harris, Chris Eaton; Word

=== Southern Gospel Recorded Song of the Year ===
==== Winner ====
- “Don't You Wanna Go?”; A Crabb Collection; The Crabb Family; Gerald Crabb; Family Music Group

==== Nominees ====
1. "Don't You Wanna Go?"; A Crabb Collection; The Crabb Family; Gerald Crabb; Family Music Group
2. "I Rest My Case at the Cross"; Changed Forever; The Perrys; Kyla Rowland; Daywind
3. "I Wanna Know How It Feels"; Triumph; Karen Peck and New River; John Darin Rowsey, Karen Peck Gooch; Spring Hill
4. "I'm Gonna Sing"; Everything Good; Gaither Vocal Band; Gloria Gaither, Bill Gaither, Woody Wright; Spring House
5. "More Than Ever"; I Do Believe; Gaither Vocal Band; Gloria Gaither, Bill Gaither, Woody Wright; Spring Hill

=== Bluegrass Recorded Song of the Year ===
==== Winner ====
- “Walkin' and Talkin'”; 50th Anniversary; The Lewis Family; Wayne Haun, Joel Lindsey; Thoroughbred

==== Nominees ====
1. "I Sure Miss You"; A Crabb Collection; The Crabb Family; Gerald Crabb; Family Music Group
2. "I've Come To Take You Home"; A Crabb Collection; The Crabb Family; Gerald Crabb; Family Music Group
3. "Me and Jesus"; The Story Is...The Songs of Tom T. Hall; Charlie Sizemore, The Oak Ridge Boys; Tom T. Hall; Rebel
4. "The Devil Can't Touch Your Soul"; Principles; Rick Hendrix; Hendrix Music
5. "Walkin' and Talkin'"; 50th Anniversary; The Lewis Family; Wayne Haun, Joel Lindsey; Thoroughbred
6. "You Must Be Born Again"; My, Oh My!; Jeff & Sheri Easter; Ulys Turner; Spring Hill

=== Country Recorded Song of the Year ===
==== Winner ====
- “The River's Gonna Keep On Rolling”; Legacy...Hymns & Faith; Amy Grant; Vince Gill; Word

==== Nominees ====
1. "God Is Good All The Time"; Blinded; Dave Moody; Paul Overstreet, Don Moen; Lamon
2. "Leave Here Empty Handed"; Safe Thus Far; The Hoskins Family; Wayne Haun, Sue C. Smith; Daywind
3. "Standing on the Promises"; Glorify Edify Testify; The Martins; Bill Baumgart, Dave Clark; Spring Hill
4. "The Most Inconvenient Christmas"; An Inconvenient Christmas; The Oak Ridge Boys; Kyle Matthews; Spring Hill
5. "The River's Gonna Keep On Rolling"; Legacy...Hymns & Faith; Amy Grant; Vince Gill; Word

=== Urban Recorded Song of the Year ===
==== Winner ====
- “Meditate”; This Is Your Life; Out of Eden; Lisa Kimmey, Michael Clemons, Nate Clemons, Eric Roberson; Gotee

==== Nominees ====
1. Get Up"; Real; Israel; Paul Garcia, Israel Houghton, Tim Johnson; Integrity Gospel
2. "Holla"; The Kiss; Trin-i-tee 5:7; James Moss, Paul Allen; Gospocentric/B-Rite
3. "It's All About You"; I Need You Now; Smokie Norful; Smokie Norful, Antonio Dixon; EMI Gospel
4. "Meditate"; This Is Your Life; Out of Eden; Lisa Kimmey, Michael Clemons, Nate Clemons, Eric Roberson; Gotee
5. "Ordinary People"; Incredible; Mary Mary; Charlie Bereal, Kenny Bereal, Tina Atkins-Campbell, Erica Atkins-Campbell; Integrity

=== Traditional Gospel Recorded Song of the Year ===
==== Winner ====
- “Holding On”; Amazing Love; Mississippi Mass Choir; Dorothy Love-Coates; Malaco

==== Nominee ====
1. "Closet Religion"; Churchin' With Dottie; Dottie Peoples; Dottie Peoples; Atlanta International
2. "Drug Me"; Walking By Faith; The Canton Spirituals; Harvey Watkins, JR.; Verity
3. "Endow Me"; Twinkie Clark & Friends...Live in Charlotte; Twinkie Clark; Twinkie Clark; Verity
4. "Holding On"; Amazing Love; Mississippi Mass Choir; Dorothy Love-Coates; Malaco
5. "I Love To Praise Him"; Praise in His Presence Live; Marvin Sapp; Frederick L. Vaughn, Ralph Lofton, Paul Wright, Terry Baker, Simeon Baker, Charles Al Willis; Harborwood
6. "People Get Ready"; Higher Ground; Blind Boys Of Alabama; Curtis Mayfield; EMI Gospel
7. "Thank You"; Believe; Yolanda Adams; V. Michael McKay; Elektra
8. "The Glory of the Blood"; Left Behind II-Tribulation Force Gospel; Dottie Peoples; Reggie Hamm, Jim Cooper; Gospel One

=== Contemporary Gospel Recorded Song of the Year ===
Winner4

- “In The Morning”; Incredible; Mary Mary; Warryn Campbell, Tina Akins-Campbell, Erica Atkins-Campbell, J. Campbell; Integrity

==== Nominees ====
1. "Brighter Day"; The Rebirth of Kirk Franklin; Kirk Franklin; Kirk Franklin; Gospocentric
2. "For Love Alone"; CeCe Winans; CeCe Winans; CeCe Winans, Adam Anders, Pamela Sheyne; Wellspring Gospel
3. "Hosanna"; The Rebirth of Kirk Franklin; Kirk Franklin; Kirk Franklin; Gospocentric
4. "In The Morning"; Incredible; Mary Mary; Warryn Campbell, Tina Akins-Campbell, Erica Atkins-Campbell, J. Campbell; Integrity
5. "The Best Is Yet To Come"; Go Get Your Life Back; Donald Lawrence & The Tri-City Singers; Donald Lawrence, Crystal Bernard; EMI Gospel

=== Rap/Hip Hop/Dance Album of the Year ===
==== Winner ====
- The Art Of Translation; GRITS; Teron Carter, Stacey Jones, Ric Robbins, Otto Price, Kenne Bell; Gotee

==== Nominees ====
1. Beautiful; Brent Jones & the T.P. Mobb; Walter 'Lil Walt' Milsap Jr., Brian Peters, Brent Jones, Gorden Campbell, Asaph Ward, Gregg Curtis, Joe Wolfe, George Hambrick; EMI Gospel
2. Collaborations; KJ-52; Todd Collins; Uprok
3. Exodus; Andy Hunter; Tedd T., Andy Hunter; Sparrow
4. Hindsight; John Reuben; Todd Collins, John Reuben; Gotee
5. The Art Of Translation; GRITS; Teron Carter, Stacey Jones, Ric Robbins, Otto Price, Kenne Bell; Gotee

=== Modern Rock/Alternative Album of the Year ===
==== Winner ====
- The Eleventh Hour; Jars of Clay; Dan Haseltine, Charlie Lowell, Stephen Mason, Matt Odmark; Essential

==== Nominees ====
1. Contact; The Benjamin Gate; Quinlan; ForeFront
2. Divine Discontent; Sixpence None the Richer; Paul Fox, Matt Slocum; Reprise
3. The Eleventh Hour; Jars of Clay; Dan Haseltine, Charlie Lowell, Stephen Mason, Matt Odmark; Essential
4. The Way I Am; Jennifer Knapp; Tony McAnany; Gotee
5. Welcome to the Rock 'N' Roll Worship Circus; The Rock 'N' Roll Worship Circus; Gabriel Wilson, Solo; Vertical

=== Hard Music Album of the Year ===
==== Winners ====
- Fireproof; Pillar; Travis Wyrick; Flicker USA

==== Nominees ====
1. Conceived in Fire; Living Sacrifice; Barry Poynter; Solid State
2. Demon Hunter; Demon Hunter; Aaron Sprinkle; Solid State
3. Fireproof; Pillar; Travis Wyrick; Flicker USA
4. Parade Of Chaos; ZAO; Barry Poynter; Solid State
5. Truthless Heroes; Project 86; Matt Hyde; Tooth & Nail

=== Rock Album of the Year ===
==== Winner ====
- Lift; Audio Adrenaline; Mark Stuart, Will McGinnis, Ben Cissell, Tyler Burkum; ForeFront

==== Nominees ====
1. 12 Stones; 12 Stones; Jay Baumgardner, Dave Fortman; Wind Up
2. Kutless; Kutless; Aaron Sprinkle; Tooth & Nail
3. Lift; Audio Adrenaline; Mark Stuart, Will McGinnis, Ben Cissell, Tyler Burkum; ForeFront
4. Truth, Soul, Rock & Roll; The Elms; Brent Milligan; Sparrow
5. Turn The Tides; 38th Parallel; Tony McAnany; Squint

=== Pop/Contemporary Album of the Year ===
==== Winner ====
- Woven & Spun; Nichole Nordeman; Charlie Peacock, Mark Hammond; Sparrow

==== Nominees ====
1. By Surprise; Joy Williams; Brown Bannister; Reunion
2. Myself When I Am Real; Bebo Norman; Ed Cash, Bebo Norman; Essential
3. New Map of the World; Paul Colman Trio; Monroe Jones; Essential
4. Spoken For; MercyMe; Peter Kipley; INO
5. Woven & Spun; Nichole Nordeman; Charlie Peacock, Mark Hammond; Sparrow

=== Inspirational Album of the Year ===
==== Winner ====
- Legacy...Hymns & Faith; Amy Grant; Brown Bannister, Vince Gill; Word

==== Nominees ====
1. Be Glad; The Brooklyn Tabernacle Choir; Carol Cymbala; M2.0
2. Legacy...Hymns & Faith; Amy Grant; Brown Bannister, Vince Gill; Word
3. Ronnie Freeman; Ronnie Freeman; Bryan Lenox; Rocketown
4. Storm; Fernando Ortega; John Andrew Schreiner; Word
5. Woven in Time; Steve Green; Phil Naish; Sparrow

=== Southern Gospel Album of the Year ===
==== Winner ====
- A Crabb Collection; The Crabb Family; Mike Bowling; Family Music Group

==== Nominees ====
1. A Crabb Collection; The Crabb Family; Mike Bowling; Family Music Group
2. Gold City Camp Meetin'; Gold City; Daniel Riley, Doug Riley; New Haven
3. Live at First Baptist Atlanta; Greater Vision; Wayne Haun, Gerald Wolfe; Daywind
4. Safe Thus Far; The Hoskins Family; Wayne Haun; Daywind
5. Triumph; Karen Peck & New River; Michael Sykes, Phil Johnson; Spring Hill

=== Bluegrass Album of the Year ===
==== Winner ====
- 50th Anniversary Celebration; Lewis Family; Wayne Haun, Buddy Spicher; Thoroughbred

==== Nominees ====
1. 50th Anniversary Celebration; Lewis Family; Wayne Haun, Buddy Spicher; Thoroughbred
2. Climbing Up the Ladder; Principles; Rick Hendrix, Ronne Slagle; Hendrix Music
3. Faraway Land; Ron Block; Ron Block; Rounder
4. Oh Brother....What Now?; Chigger Hill Boys and Terri; Terri Argot, Justin Kropf, Mike Richards, Rodney Lay Jr., Ricky Gore; Mator'Lick
5. Tribute To Gov. Jimmie Davis; The Village Singers; Sonny Osbourne; Pinecastle

=== Country Album of the Year ===
==== Winner ====
- Rise And Shine; Randy Travis; Kyle Lehning; Word

==== Nominees ====
1. An Inconvenient Christmas; The Oak Ridge Boys; Michael Sykes, Duane Allen; Spring Hill
2. Everything Good; Gaither Vocal Band; Bill Gaither, Michael Sykes, Guy Penrod; Spring House
3. How Sweet The Sound; The Charlie Daniels Band; Charlie Daniels, Patrick Kelly, David Corlew; Sparrow
4. My, Oh My!; Jeff & Sheri Easter; Michael Sykes; Spring Hill
5. Rise And Shine; Randy Travis; Kyle Lehning; Word

=== Urban Album of the Year ===
==== Winners (tied) ====
- Fault Is History; Souljahz; Tonex, Chris Rodriguez; Warner Brothers
- This Is Your Life; Out of Eden; Lisa Kimmey, Donnie Scantz, Jaimie Portee, Nate Clemmons; Gotee

==== Nominees ====
1. Believe; Yolanda Adams; Jimmy Jam, Terry Lewis, James "Big Jam" Wright, Shep Crawford, Kevin Bond, Mike City, Warryn Campbell, Buster, Shavoni; Elektra
2. Fault Is History; Souljahz; Tonex, Chris Rodriguez; Warner Brothers
3. Incredible; Mary Mary; Warryn Campbell, Rodney Jerkins, Charlie Bereal, Kenny Bereal, Mike City; Integrity
4. The Kiss; Trin-i-tee 5:7; Darren Henson, Shep Crawford, Carvin Higgins; Gospocentric/B-Rite
5. This Is Your Life; Out of Eden; Lisa Kimmey, Donnie Scantz, Jaimie Portee, Nate Clemmons; Gotee

=== Traditional Gospel Album of the Year ===
==== Winner ====
- Higher Ground; Blind Boys of Alabama; John Chelew; Real World/EMI Gospel

==== Nominees ====
1. Churchin' With Dottie; Dottie Peoples; Dottie Peoples; Atlanta International
2. Come Fly With Me; Luther Barnes; Luther Barnes; Atlanta International
3. Higher Ground; Blind Boys of Alabama; John Chelew; Real World/EMI Gospel
4. I Owe You The Praise; The Georgia Mass Choir; Rev. Milton Biggham; Savoy
5. Nobody But You; Norman Hutchins; Professor James Roberson, Jason White; JDI
6. Walking By Faith; The Canton Spirituals; Harvey Watkins Jr., Cornelius Dwayne Watkins, Merlin Lucious; Verity

=== Contemporary Gospel Album of the Year ===
==== Winner ====
- The Rebirth of Kirk Franklin; Kirk Franklin; Sanchez Harley, Kirk Franklin; Gospocentric

==== Nominees ====
1. Beautiful World; Take 6; Marcus Miller, Alvin Chea, Cedric Dent, Joel Kibble, Mark Kibble, Claude McKnight, David Thomas; Squint
2. I Need You Now; Smokie Norful; Derek 'DOA' Allen, Smokie Norful, Edwin Oliver III, Antonio Dixon, Logan Reynolds; EMI Gospel
3. Real; Israel; Tommy Sims, Danny Duncan; Integrity Gospel
4. Speak Those Things: POL Chapter 3; Fred Hammond; Fred Hammond, Warryn Campbell; Verity
5. The Rebirth of Kirk Franklin; Kirk Franklin; Sanchez Harley, Kirk Franklin; Gospocentric

=== Instrumental Album of the Year ===
- Hymnsongs; Phil Keaggy; Phil Keaggy, Ric Hordinski; Word

==== Nominees ====
1. Did You Feel The Mountains Tremble; Rivertribe; Stuart Favilla, Dave Gleeson, Mike Lane; Elevate
2. Hymnsongs; Phil Keaggy; Phil Keaggy, Ric Hordinski; Word
3. In The Spirit; Kirk Whalum, Ben Tankard, Steven Ford, Abraham Laboriel; Joe Pace; Integrity Gospel
4. Praise & Worship Instrumental; Mike Casteel, Eda Chako-Moore, Amy Cooper, Tracey Phillips, Robbie Shankle; Wayne Haun, Michelle Gayhart, Tracy Phillips; Daywind
5. Resting Place: David Hamilton; David Hamilton; Word
6. The Gospel According to Jazz (Chapter II); Kirk Whalum; Kirk Whalum, Tyrone Dickerson, Hal Sacks; Warner Brothers Jazz

=== Praise & Worship Album of the Year ===
==== Winner ====
- Worship Again; Michael W. Smith; Michael W. Smith; Reunion

==== Nominees ====
1. Blessed; Darlene Zschech; Hillsong Music/Integrity Music
2. Lifestyle; The Katinas; Bryan Lenox, Sam Katina, John Katina, James Katina, Joe Katina, Jessie Katina; Gotee
3. Not To Us; Chris Tomlin; Sam Gibson, Matt Bronleewe; sixstepsrecords
4. Worship Again; Michael W. Smith; Michael W. Smith; Reunion
5. Worship God; Rebecca St. James; Matt Bronleewe; ForeFront

=== Children's Music Album of the Year ===
==== Winner ====
- Jonah, A Veggie Tales Movie Original Soundtrack; Kurt Heinecke, Phil Vischer, Mike Nawrocki, David Mullen, Steve Taylor, Monroe Jones; Big Idea

==== Nominees ====
1. Club de la Aventura 2; Nathan Aanderud; Nathan Aanderud; Vida
2. Jonah, A Veggie Tales Movie Original Soundtrack; Kurt Heinecke, Phil Vischer, Mike Nawrocki, David Mullen, Steve Taylor, Monroe Jones; Big Idea
3. Meet Me at the Manger; Celeste Clydesdale, David T. Clydesdale; Clydesdale & Clydesdale
4. Shout Praises! - Kid's Gospel; Israel Houghton; Integrity
5. Toddler Bible Songs; Cedarmont Kids; Mike Gay, Sue Gay, Christopher Davis, Matt Huesmann; Cedarmont Kids

=== Spanish Language Album of the Year ===
==== Winner ====
- Navidad; Jaci Velasquez; Chris Harris for Fun Attic Prod., Alejandro Jean; Word

==== Nominees ====
1. Alabanza y Adoracion en Vivo (Desde Espana); Marcos Vidal; Tom Brooks and Abraham Laboriel; Piedra Angular
2. Me Inundas; Rodrigo Espinoza; Alvaro Lopez, Jose Garces; One Voice
3. Navidad; Jaci Velasquez; Chris Harris for Fun Attic Prod., Alejandro Jean; Word
4. Proclamare Tu Amor 2; Generaciones; Miguel Angel Villagran; Integrity
5. Spanish Prayer Of Jabez; Susana Allen, Michael Rodriguez, Steve Reischl, Rene Gonzalez, Jamie Rowe, Jaime Murrell, Ruth Rios; John Hartley, David Zaffiro, Alex Allen, Arturo Allen; ForeFront
6. Yo Ire; Steve Green; Phil Naish For NT Productions; Sparrow

=== Special Event Album of the Year ===
==== Winner ====
- City On A Hill-Sing Alleluia; Caedmon's Call, FFH, Jars of Clay, Jennifer Knapp, Phil Keaggy, Nichole Nordeman, Bebo Norman, Fernando Ortega, The Choir, Third Day; Steve Hindalong, Marc Byrd; Essential

==== Nominees ====
1. All Star Hymns; Greater Vision, Gold City, Perrys, Brian Free & Assurance, Cumberland Quartet, Nelons, LordSong, Mike Bowling, Paynes, Southern Brothers, Hoskins Family, Ernie Haase, Old Time Gospel Hour Quartet; Wayne Haun, Norman Holland; Daywind
2. City on a Hill-Sing Alleluia; Caedmon's Call, FFH, Jars of Clay, Jennifer Knapp, Phil Keaggy, Nichole Nordeman, Bebo Norman, Fernando Ortega, The Choir, Third Day; Steve Hindalong, Marc Byrd; Essential
3. Girls Of Grace; Point of Grace, Nichole Nordeman, Christy Nockels, Out of Eden, Rachael Lampa, Jennifer Deibler, Jaci Velasquez, Jill Phillips, Joy Williams; Nathan Nockels; Word
4. Passion - Our Love Is Loud; Charlie Hall, Chris Tomlin, David Crowder; Tom Laune, Louie Giglio, Shelley Giglio; sixstepsrecords
5. Traveling Light; Joel Hanson, Sara Groves, Amy Grant, Bryan White, Jaci Velasquez, Mac Powell, Adore, Fleming & John, Russ Taff, Jenna Lucado, Michael Tait, Ellie Bannister, Derri Daugherty; Steve Hindalong, Brown Bannister; Creative Trust Workshop

=== Musical of the Year ===
==== Winner ====
- The Christmas Shoes; Donna VanLiere, Eddie Carswell, J. Daniel Smith; Brentwood Music Publications

==== Nominees ====
1. Agnus Dei; David Hamilton with Dennis, Karla Worley; Word Music
2. Christmas Is Jesus; Mike Speck; Word Music
3. God in Us; Don Moen, Tom Fettke, Randy Vader, Jack Hayford, Jay Rouse, Camp Kirkland; Integrity
4. Land of the Free; Sue C. Smith, Russell Mauldin; Brentwood Music Publications
5. The Christmas Shoes; Donna VanLiere, Eddie Carswell, J. Daniel Smith; Brentwood Music Publications

=== Youth/Children's Musical of the Year ===
==== Winner ====
- Meet Me At The Manger; Celeste Clydesdale; Clydesdale & Clydesdale Music

==== Nominees ====
1. Christmas Time; Tony Wood, Scott Krippayne, Stephen Tedeschi, Craig Adams; Brentwood Music Publications
2. Meet Me at the Manger; Celeste Clydesdale; Clydesdale & Clydesdale Music
3. Stranger in the Manger; Sue C. Smith, Johnathan Crumpton; Brentwood Kids Music Club
4. The Prayer Of Jabez; Karla Worley, Robert Sterling; Word Music
5. The Tale of Three Trees; Dave Clark, Jayme Thompson; Brentwood Kids Music Club

=== Choral Collection of the Year ===
==== Winner ====
- More Songs For Praise & Worship 2; Ken Barker, Keith Christopher; Word Music

==== Nominees ====
1. Be Glad; Carol Cymbala; Brooklyn Tabernacle Music
2. Christ Church Choir's Christmas Tapestry; Landy Gardner, Joy Gardner, Bradley Knight; Brentwood Music Publications
3. More Songs For Praise & Worship 2; Ken Barker, Keith Christopher; Word Music
4. Song of Praise; Geron Davis; Spirit Sound Music
5. The WOW Collection; Steven V. Taylor, Johnathan Crumpton; Brentwood Music Publications

=== Recorded Music Packaging of the Year ===
==== Winner ====
- Welcome To The Rock 'N' Roll Worship Circus; The Rock 'N' Roll Worship; Sam Noerr; Matthew Lloyd; Karen Mason-Blair; Vertical

==== Nominees ====
1. Cover Me; Brother's Keeper; Craig Thompson, David Terri; Craig Thompson, David Terri; Ben Pearson; Ardent
2. Hero; Daily Planet; Stephanie McBrayer, Scott Hughes; Rusty Mitchell; Kristin Barlowe; Reunion
3. Hi-Fi Revival; The O.C. Supertones; Don Clark; Don Clark; Ben Pearson; Tooth & Nail
4. The Art and Craft of Popular Music; Joy Electric; Don Clark; Don Clark; Tim Owen, Brandon Ebel, Matt Wignall, David Johnson; BEC
5. Unusual; All Together Separate; Craig Thompson, David Terri; Craig Thompson, David Terri; Dave Studarus, Gary Walpole; Ardent
6. Welcome to the Rock 'N' Roll Worship Circus; The Rock 'N' Roll Worship; Sam Noerr; Matthew Lloyd; Karen Mason-Blair; Vertical

=== Short Form Music Video of the Year ===
==== Winner ====
- “Irene”; tobyMac; Alex Moon; Rich Kim; ForeFront

==== Nominees ====
1. "Brighter Day"; Kirk Franklin; Keith Paschall; Billy Woodruff; Gospocentric
2. "Existence"; Kevin Max; April Dace; Steven Weaver; ForeFront
3. "Holla"; Trin-i-tee 5:7; Keith Paschall; Billy Woodruff; Gospocentric/B-Rite
4. "Irene"; tobyMac; Alex Moon; Rick Kim; ForeFront
5. "There She Stands"; Michael W. Smith; Rod Carpenter; Ken Carpenter; Reunion
6. "Wait For Me"; Rebecca St. James; Tameron Hedge; Erick Welch; ForeFront

=== Long Form Music Video of the Year ===
==== Winner ====
- Worship; Michael W. Smith; Michael W. Smith; Michael Sacci, Ken Conrad; Carl Diebold; Reunion

==== Nominees ====
1. 11 Live: Jars of Clay in Concert; Jars of Clay; Caryl Glotzer, Stephen Wallen; Manny Rodriquez; Essential
2. All The Best...Live; Sandi Patty; David Imber, Bubba Smith; Monte Johnson; Word
3. Momentum DVD; tobyMac; Scott McDaniel, Tameron Hedge, Eric Welch, Alex Moon; Eric Welch, Rich Kim; ForeFront
4. Newsboys Thrive From the Rock and Roll Hall of Fame and Museum; Newsboys; Jerry Rose; Michael Drumm; Sparrow
5. Worship; Michael W. Smith; Michael W. Smith; Michael Sacci, Ken Conrad; Carl Diebold; Reunion
