= Pretend You're Alive - 10 Year Anniversary Edition: Rarities =

Pretend You're Alive - 10-Year Anniversary Edition: Rarities

Studio album by Lovedrug
- Released: July 27, 2014
- Genre: Indie rock
- Length: 1:32:09
- Label: Street Talk Media

Lovedrug chronology
Wild Blood (2012)	Pretend You're Alive - 10-Year Anniversary Edition: Rarities (2014)	Notions (2015)

Pretend You're Alive - 10-Year Anniversary Edition: Rarities is a collection of demos, live recordings, and unreleased songs released by Lovedrug to commemorate the tenth anniversary of their debut full-length album, Pretend You're Alive.

== Track listing ==
No.	Title	Length
1.	"Candy (Demo)"	6:17
2.	"The Monster (Demo)"	5:48
3.	"Spiders (Radio Edit)"	3:19
4.	"In Red (Demo)"	4:40
5.	"Down Towards the Healing (Demo)"	6:42
6.	"The Narcoleptic (Demo)"	5:10
7.	"It Won't Last (Demo)"	4:09
8.	"Blackout (Demo)"	5:02
9.	"Your Coarse Words Hurt (Demo)"	2:41
10.	"Pretend You're Alive (Piano Demo)"	4:41
11.	"Angels with Enemies (EP Version)"	4:32
12.	"Why Can't You Love Me At All (Demo)"	5:31
13.	"Skeleton Jill"	5:16
14.	"Goodbye Blue Fly"	2:12
15.	"Radiology (Live at Grog Shop - Feb. 9, 2005)"	4:36
16.	"Pandamoranda (Live at CBGB - Oct. 13, 2004)"	3:05
17.	"Pretend You're Alive (Live at CBGB - Oct. 13, 2004)"	5:46
18.	"Rocknroll (Live at Grog Shop - Feb. 9, 2005)"	3:39
19.	"Spiders (Live at CBGB - Oct. 13, 2004)"	3:19
20.	"Down Towards the Healing (Live at CBGB - Oct. 13, 2004)"	5:43
Total length:		1:32:09
