= Nonexistent (album) =

Studio album by Living Sacrifice
- Released: November 17, 1992; July 13, 1999 (Re-release)
- Studio: Downstage Studio, Nashville, Tennessee
- Genre: Death metal, Christian metal
- Length: 39:54
- Label: R.E.X., Solid State (Re-release)
- Producer: Doug "Psychoboy" Mann

Living Sacrifice chronology
Living Sacrifice (1991)	Nonexistent (1992)	Inhabit (1994)

Professional ratings
Review scores
Source	Rating
AllMusic	3/5 stars
Jesus Freak Hideout	3/5 stars

Nonexistent is the second album by extreme metal band Living Sacrifice. The album was released through R.E.X. Records in 1992. The album was recorded quickly after the debut self-titled album in Nashville, Tennessee and produced by Doug Mann. The album is a notable change for the band, as the debut focused more on a thrash metal sound, while the follow-up has a heavy emphasis on death metal, drawing more from artists such as Gorguts or Obituary.

== History ==
The album was recorded in Nashville, Tennessee a short time after the release of their self-titled debut album in 1991. The band began their recording with Doug Mann and engineer Martin Woodlee. The band originally hoped to have Scott Burns (Death, Sepultura, Cannibal Corpse) produce the album, with interest on both sides as the self-titled was on his top albums of 1991. However, the label requested the album be done sooner, which Burns could not due to scheduling. Martin Woodlee was hired as an engineer instead, which the band has been vocally upset with. According to the members of the band, he was unaware of how to produce the style they were attempting to produce. The band eventually asked him to step aside from the recording process, with DJ Johnson and Lance Garvin managing the mixing and EQ for the album.

In 2022, a remaster and remix was released on the 30th anniversary of the album, to remedy the issues the band had with the production. The remaster and remix was produced by Jeremiah Scott who produced The Infinite Order and Ghost Thief.

== Critical reception ==
AllMusic.com wrote "While the term Christian death metal seems like one of music's most comical oxymorons, Living Sacrifice does a decent job proving that the band deserves respect on this, one of its heaviest recordings.", giving the release a 3 out of 5 star review.

Jesus Freak Hideout gave the album a 3 of 5 review, remarking that "All in all, Nonexistent is worth your time. The music is good and so is the message. Sure, the vocals can get irritating, but it's comfortable to know that even though sometimes you don't know what is being said, God does and He is being praised."

Jason McLaren for Heaven's Metal magazine praised the 2022 remaster and remix, with improved production values giving "the album the impact it should have always had". The album contained every essential part of old school death metal; "the riffing, the production, the sheer sonic brutality", and the band's Christian faith also came through clearly: "that conviction only makes this album more powerful". Comparing the album to others, Nonexistent was "one of the greatest records the Christian death metal scene has ever produced" and could be among the "top 10 death metal albums of all time". In an overview of all Living Sacrifice albums, McLaren ranked Nonexistent 1st, and reiterated the album's status as "one of the greatest death metal records of all time".

== Track listing ==
All tracks are written by Living Sacrifice, except where noted.

No.	Title	Writer(s)	Length
1.	"Emerge"	Scott Albert	1:20
2.	"Enthroned"		3:30
3.	"Non-Existent"		4:47
4.	"Haven of Blasphemy"		2:54
5.	"...To Nothing"		3:17
6.	"Void Expression"		5:40
7.	"Atonement"		5:30
8.	"Distorted"		4:41
9.	"Chemical Straitjacket"		4:54
10.	"Without Distinction"		3:23

"Haven of Blasphemy", performed by Mindrage, was track #1 on the 2002 tribute album A Tribute To Living Sacrifice.

== Personnel ==
Living Sacrifice

- Darren "D.J." Johnson - Vocals, Bass
- Jason Truby - Lead Guitars
- Bruce Fitzhugh - Rhythm Guitars
- Lance Garvin - Drums

Production

- Thomas "Lark" Wolfe - Sleeve Design
- Martin Woodlee - Engineer
- Doug "Psychoboy" Mann - Producer, Executive Producer
- P. Gavin Morkel - Executive Producer
- Scott Albert - arrangements and programming on "Emerge"
