= Eso-Charis (album) =

Studio album by Eso-Charis
- Released: 1998
- Genre: Christian metal
- Length: 30:18
- Label: Seize the Day, Day-Glo, Solid State
- Producer: Barry Poynter; Bruce Fitzhugh

Eso-Charis chronology
The Plateau Green (1997)	Eso-Charis (1998)	Setting Roots for Winter (2000)

Professional ratings
Review scores
Source	Rating
HM Magazine	(indie)

Eso-Charis is an album of the band Eso-Charis. The album was originally released independently in 1998, later being released by Day-Glo Records of Sweden, and even later by Solid State Records, the label of Living Sacrifice, which three of the members were also a part of.

== Track listing ==
1. "Born with a Future" - 4:16
2. "Processed Bodies" - 4:27
3. "Once upon a Fashionable" - 5:00
4. "The Narrowing List" - 4:31
5. "Spirit of Revival" - 1:34
6. "Dunamis" - 4:24
7. "Skimmers" - 3:06
8. "The Judas Swing" - 1:41
9. "Outro" - 1:22

== Credits ==
Eso-Charis

- Cory Brandan – Lead vocals, guitar
- Jayson Holmes – Guitar, backing vocals
- Arthur Green – Bass, backing vocals
- Matthew Putman – Drums

Production

- Produced by Bruce Fitzhugh
- Mastered by Kent Stump
- Mixed by Barry Poynter
