= Becoming Saints =

American metalcore band

- Origin: Little Rock, Arkansas, U.S.
- Genres: Metalcore, hardcore punk, Christian metal
- Years active: 2003–2006, 2013, 2014–2019
- Labels: Rottweiler
- Members: Drew Garrison; Jeff Bowie; Allen Robson; Kory Olson; Jake Evans
- Past members: Dylan Rylee; Joe Maneiro
- Website: Becoming Saints on Facebook

Becoming Saints is an American metalcore band that originated in Little Rock, Arkansas in 2003.

== Background ==
Becoming Saints formed in 2003 in Little Rock, Arkansas. The band released their album Bury Them, Bury Them All independently and then went on a hiatus in 2006. During the band's hiatus, the members went on to new musical projects, most notably, bassist Jeff Bowie joining Soul Embraced.

In 2013, the band reemerged and released an EP: Let This Not Be the End of Me.

In 2016, the band announced they had signed to Rottweiler Records. Drummer Dylan Rylee left the band and was replaced by Jake Evans. Later in 2016, the band released a video for "Built for War" from their Oh, the Suffering album.

In 2017, the band released a lyric video for "Vox Mortem".

== Members ==
Former

- Dylan Rylee – drums (2003–2006, 2013, 2014–2016)
- Joe Maneiro – keyboards, percussion (2003–2006)
- Drew Garrison – vocals (2003–2006, 2013, 2014–2019)
- Jeff Bowie – bass guitar (2003–2006, 2013, 2014–2019)
- Allen Robsen – guitar (2003–2006, 2013, 2014–2019)
- Kory Olson – guitar, vocals (2003–2006, 2013, 2014–2019)
- Jake Evans – drums (2016–2019)

== Discography ==
Studio albums

- Oh, the Suffering (October 21, 2016; Rottweiler)

EPs

- Bury Them, Bury Them All (2005)
- Let This Not Be the End of Me (2013)

Singles

- "Lost" (featuring Bruce Fitzhugh of Living Sacrifice) (2016)

Compilation appearances

- The Pack Vol. 1 (2016; Rottweiler)
- Metal From The Dragon (Vol. 2) (2017; The Bearded Dragon Productions)
