= Inhabit =

Inhabit means to live in, reside in, occupy or populate some place – a so-called habitat.

Inhabit may also refer to:

- Inhabit (album), an album by Living Sacrifice
- Inhabited (band), a rock group

== See also ==
- Circumstellar habitable zone
- List of uninhabited regions
- Planetary habitability
