= Mark Dugdale =

American IFBB professional bodybuilder

- Professional bodybuilder

Personal info
- Born: December 25, 1974 (age 50)

Best statistics

Mark James Dugdale (born December 25, 1974) is an American IFBB professional bodybuilder. He lives in Woodinville, Washington.

His first competition in bodybuilding was in 1997 when he competed in the NPC (National Physique Committee) Emerald Cup. He placed 3rd in the middleweight class. His first Arnold Classic was in 2005, where he placed 9th. Later that year he competed in the Ironman Pro Invitational and the San Francisco Pro Invitational, placing 8th and 6th, respectively. He recently portrayed Achilles on the album cover for Back Breaker, the third album from the Tennessee Thrash metal band The Showdown.

== Profile ==
- Family: Christina Dugdale; 3 children (Madison Dugdale
- Off-Season Weight: 240 lb.
- Competition Weight: 212 lb.
- Training location: Gold's Gym, Kirkland, Washington
- Training partner: Christina Dugdale

== Contest history ==
- 1997 NPC Emerald Cup, Middleweight, 3rd
- 1998 NPC USA Championships, Middleweight, 12th
- 1999 NPC Nationals, Middleweight, 6th
- 2001 NPC Nationals, Light-Heavyweight, 9th
- 2003 NPC Los Angeles Championships, Light-Heavyweight, 1st and Overall
- 2003 NPC USA Championships, Light-Heavyweight, 3rd
- 2004 NPC USA Championships, Light-HeavyWeight, 1st and Overall
- 2005 Arnold Classic, 9th
- 2005 Ironman Pro Invitational, 8th
- 2005 San Francisco Pro Invitational, 6th
- 2006 Ironman Pro Invitational, 5th
- 2007 Ironman Pro Invitational, 2nd
- 2007 Arnold Classic, 11th
- 2008 IFBB Tampa Bay Pro, 13th
- 2008 IFBB Europa, 9th
- 2009 IFBB Iron Man Pro, 8th
- 2009 IFBB Pittsburgh Pro, 2nd
- 2009 IFBB New York Pro, 2nd
- 2009 IFBB Olympia, 4th
- 2009 IFBB Sacramento 6th
- 2010 IFBB John Simmons, 4th
- 2011 IFBB Pro Bodybuilding Weekly Championships, 4th
- 2012 IFBB FLEX Pro, 7th
- 2012 IFBB Desert Muscle Classic, 2nd
- 2013 IFBB New York Pro, 3rd
- 2013 IFBB Toronto Pro Supershow, 2nd
- 2013 IFBB Olympia Weekend, 10th
- 2013 IFBB Europa Phoenix, 2nd
- 2014 IFBB Europa Phoenix, 2nd
- 2014 IFBB Olympia Weekend, 12th
- 2014 IFBB Bodypower Pro, 3rd
- 2014 IFBB Toronto Pro, 2nd
- 2014 IFBB Europa Phoenix, 2nd
- 2015 IFBB Europa Phoenix, 5th
- 2016 IFBB Toronto Pro, Men's 212, 4th
- 2016 IFBB Arctic Pro, Men's 212, 1st
- 2016 IFBB Vancouver Pro, Men's 212, 1st
- 2016 IFBB Chicago Pro, Men's 212, 1st

== See also ==
- List of male professional bodybuilders
- List of female professional bodybuilders
- Mr. Olympia
- Arnold Classic
