= Sown in Weakness, Raised in Power =

Studio album by Mindrage
- Released: June 1, 1999
- Recorded: June 1998
- Genres: Christian hardcore, Christian metal, metallic hardcore, groove metal
- Length: 39:53
- Label: Bulletproof
- Producers: Marty Bush, Mindrage

Mindrage chronology
Demo (1995)	Sown in Weakness, Raised in Power (1999)	Mindrage/Nailed Promise (2001)

Sown in Weakness, Raised in Power, also referred to as Sown in Weakness, is the debut and only full-length album by Christian metallic hardcore band Mindrage. It is the last release to feature Society's Finest drummer Chad Wilburn.

== Track listing ==
No.	Title	Length
1.	"Not Alone"	4:20
2.	"Voice of Disgust"	3:36
3.	"Destructive Patterns"	4:01
4.	"Passover"	3:41
5.	"Lying Breed"	3:35
6.	"Born Blind"	3:50
7.	"Raised in Power"	2:13
8.	"Asphyxiate"	3:34
9.	"Ashes"	3:58
10.	"Child"	3:38
11.	"Sown in Weakness"	3:27
Total length:		39:53

== Credits ==
Mindrage

- John LeCompt – vocals, guitar
- Nick Williams – bass
- Chad Wilburn – drums

Production

- Marty Bush – executive producer
- Jason Magnusson – assistant
- Rodney Mills – mastering
