= The Sucker Punch Show =

Studio album by Lovedrug
- Released: October 14, 2008
- Genre: Grunge, Indie rock
- Label: The Militia Group
- Producer: Michael Beinhorn

Lovedrug chronology
Everything Starts Where It Ends (2007)	The Sucker Punch Show (2008)	Wild Blood (2012)

European cover

Professional ratings
Review scores
Source	Rating
AbsolutePunk	80%
AllMusic	3/5 stars
Patrol Magazine	Unfavorable
PopMatters	4/10 stars

The Sucker Punch Show is the third full-length album released by alternative/indie rock band Lovedrug. It was released in 2008 by The Militia Group. Lyrics by Michael Shepard. Music by Michael Shepard, Jeremy Michael Gifford, Thomas Bragg and James Childress.

== Track listing ==
1. "Let It All Out" – 2:49
2. "Only One" – 3:21
3. "Blood Like" – 4:29
4. "Everyone Needs a Halo" – 4:25
5. "The Dirtiest Queen" – 4:56
6. "Borrowed Legs" – 4:49
7. "Broken Home" – 3:23
8. "Fake Angels" – 5:44
9. "My World" – 4:54
10. "Hanté Bruit" – 1:01
11. "Panicked Witness" – 6:57
12. "Dying Days" – 4:27
