= Eso-Charis =

American Christian metal band

- Also known as: Elliot (1995–1997)
- Origin: Fort Smith, Arkansas, U.S.
- Genres: Mathcore; metalcore; Christian metal; Christian hardcore
- Years active: 1995–2002
- Labels: Solid State, Day-Glo, Deadself
- Past members: Cory Brandan Putman; Matthew Putman; Arthur Green; Jayson Holmes; Matt Depper; Gabriel Edmonds; Stephen McDonald

Eso-Charis, originally called Elliot, was a Christian metalcore/mathcore band that formed in Fort Smith, Arkansas. Founding members, brothers Cory Brandan Putman and Matthew Putman, and Arthur Green, eventually went on to join the band Living Sacrifice. In late 1997, the band recorded their first and only full-length album with Bruce Fitzhugh of Living Sacrifice. The album was first produced independently, but was after leased to Day-Glo Records of Stockholm, Sweden. Later on, production of the album moved to Solid State Records, the same label as Living Sacrifice. Cory has stated that they most likely will not do a reunion. He also stated that after his brother and Green quit the band they added two guitarists, bassists, and drummers, with Cory and Jayson being the vocalists.

== Members ==
=== Final lineup ===
Name	Instrument	Years	Other groups	Additional notes
Cory Brandan Putman	rhythm guitar, vocals	1995–2002	Norma Jean, Fear Is the Driving Force, The Radio Sky, Living Sacrifice, The Handshake Murders	
Matt Depper	lead and rhythm guitar	1995–1996, 2000–2002	Lovedrug, Snailhuntr, Unwed Sailor	
Jayson Kent Holmes	lead guitar, vocals	1997–2002	The Handshake Murders	Deceased 2022
Gabriel Edmonds	bass	1999–2002		
Matthew Lee Putman	drums	1995–2002	Living Sacrifice, Lovedrug, Snailhuntr, Unwed Sailor, Bear Colony, Fear Is the Driving Force, The Early Hours, Chase Pagan	
Stephen McDonald	drums	2000–2002		
Arthur Chester Green	bass, backing vocals	1995–2002	Living Sacrifice, Soul Embraced	

- Brandan stated in an interview the final lineup consisted of eight people, with two guitarists, two bassists, two drummers and Brandan and Holmes on vocals.

=== Gallery ===
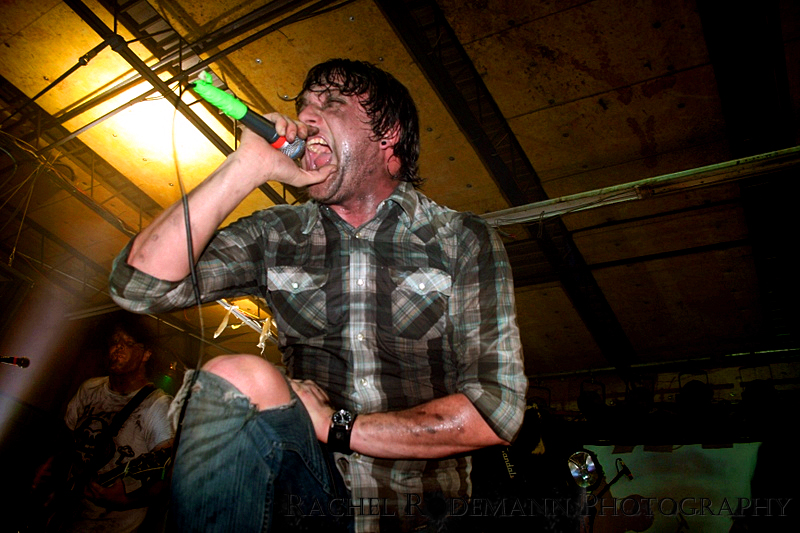
Vocalist Cory Brandan Putman live in 2007 with Norma Jean

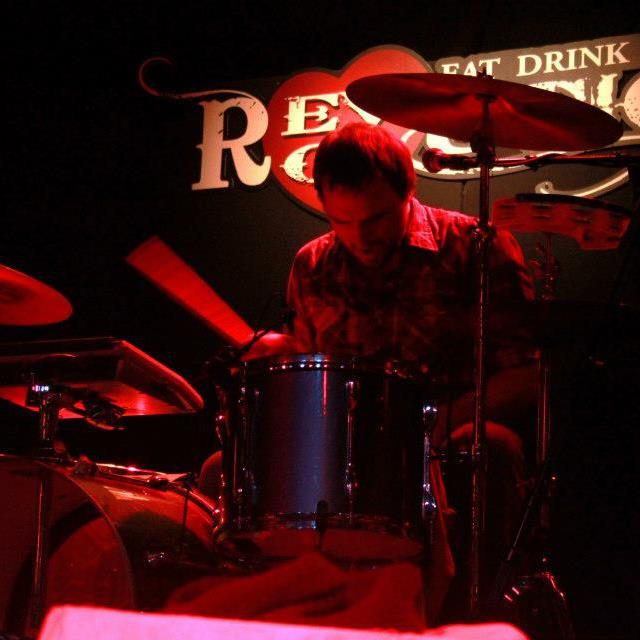
Drummer Matt Putman with Bear Colony in 2012

== Discography ==
- The Plateau Green (independent, 1997)
- Eso-Charis (Seize the Day / Day-Glo, 1998)
- Setting Roots for the Winter (7-inch record, Deadself Records, 2000)
