= Back Breaker =

Studio album by the Showdown
- Released: August 19, 2008
- Recorded: 2007–2008
- Studio: Anthem Productions, Nashville, Tennessee
- Genre: Christian metal, thrash metal, hardcore punk
- Length: 44:09
- Label: Solid State
- Producer: Jeremiah Scott

The Showdown chronology
| Temptation Come My Way (2007) | Back Breaker (2008) | Blood in the Gears (2010) |

Professional ratings
Review scores
| Source | Rating |
|---|---|
| AbsolutePunk.net | 88% |
| AllMusic | 2.5/5 stars |
| Indie Vision Music | 9.5/10 |
| Jesus Freak Hideout | 4.5/5 stars |

Back Breaker is the third album from American Christian metal band the Showdown. It is their first album with Solid State Records. On June 27, 2008, The Showdown released the track listing. On August 19, 2008, the album was released in stores. It is the last album to feature guitarist Travis Bailey, bassist Eric Koruschak, and drummer AJ Barrette.

== Style ==
The style of Back Breaker has proved to be somewhat a mix of their first two albums. They have returned to the heavier sound of A Chorus of Obliteration, while still keeping some of the southern elements of Temptation Come My Way. Lead vocalist Dave Bunton uses harsh screaming, growling, and yelling often, but also mixes in some singing. The band characterized Temptation Come My Way as being their "Black Album.", while this album has moved towards their Pantera influences. Each of the album's song titles are based on Greek mythology storylines.

The album cover was designed by Ryan Clark and features Mark Dugdale as its model.

== Track listing ==
All tracks are written by the Showdown.

| No. | Title | Length |
|---|---|---|
| 1. | "Titanomachy - The Beginning" | 2:42 |
| 2. | "Hephaestus - The Hammer of the Gods" | 4:18 |
| 3. | "Aphrodite - The Disillusionaire" | 4:14 |
| 4. | "Achilles - The Backbreaker" | 3:59 |
| 5. | "Prometheus - The Fires of Deliverance" | 3:57 |
| 6. | "Cerberus - The Hellhound Awaits" | 4:27 |
| 7. | "Odysseus - A Song of Hope" | 3:57 |
| 8. | "Aries - I Am Vengeance" | 3:25 |
| 9. | "Infernus - You Will Move" | 4:00 |
| 10. | "Nemesis - Give Us This Day" | 3:53 |
| 11. | "Medea - One Foot In Hell" | 5:12 |
| Total length: | | 45:47 |

== Credits ==
The Showdown

- David Bunton – vocals
- Josh Childers – guitar
- A. J. Barrette – drums
- Eric Koruschak – bass
- Travis Bailey – guitar

Production

- Jeremiah Scott – producer
- Ryan Clark – artwork
- Mark Dugdale – model for artwork
- Jon Dunn – A&R
- Troy Glessner – mastering
- J.R. McNeely – mixing
- Jerad Knudson – photography
- Chris Byrnes – assistant
- Justin Burns – editing
