= A Chorus of Obliteration =

Studio album by the Showdown
- Released: November 16, 2004
- Recorded: 2004
- Studios: Glow in the Dark Studios, Atlanta, Georgia; Island Bound Studio, Nashville, Tennessee
- Genres: Metalcore; melodic death metal; death metal; black metal; Southern rock
- Length: 46:33
- Label: Mono vs Stereo
- Producer: Bruce Fitzhugh

The Showdown chronology
A Chorus of Obliteration (2004)	Temptation Come My Way (2007)

Professional ratings
Review scores
Source	Rating
Jesus Freak Hideout	4/5 stars
Lambgoat	9/10
Sputnikmusic	3/5

A Chorus of Obliteration is the debut album by Christian metal band the Showdown. Every song on A Chorus of Obliteration is based on a story in the Bible. For example, "A Monument Encased in Ash" is based on the destruction of the cities of Sodom and Gomorrah, "Epic: A Chorus of Obliteration" is based on the Israelites taking down Jericho, "From the Mouth of Gath Comes Terror" is based on the conflict between David and Goliath, and "Dagon Undone (The Reckoning)" is based on Samson and Delilah. The musical style showcases the band's earlier fusion of death metal, black metal, melodic death metal, metalcore, and Southern rock.

== Track listing ==
All tracks are written by David Bunton and Travis Bailey, except where noted.

No.	Title	Writer(s)	Length
1.	"A Monument Encased in Ash"		5:53
2.	"Hell Can't Stop Us Now"		3:36
3.	"Epic: A Chorus of Obliteration"		3:31
4.	"From the Mouth of Gath Comes Terror" (featuring Josh Scogin)	Bunton, Bailey, Scogin	6:28
5.	"A Proclamation of Evil's Fate"		4:03
6.	"Dagon Undone – The Reckoning"" (featuring Bruce Fitzhugh)		4:31
7.	"Iscariot"		2:59
8.	"Dolor Per Proelium – Your Name Is Defeat"		2:32
9.	"Deus Invictus – Your Name Is Victory"		3:02
10.	"Laid to Rest"		5:54

2006 European re-release bonus track
No.	Title	Length
11.	"Give Us This Day" (later re-recorded for Back Breaker)	4:04

== Personnel ==
The Showdown

- David Bunton – lead vocals
- Josh Childers – lead guitar, backing vocals
- Travis Bailey – rhythm guitar, piano
- Eric Korshack – bass
- Andrew Hall – drums, percussion

Additional Musicians

- Josh Scogin – Guest Vocals on track 4
- Bruce Fitzhugh – Guest Vocals on track 6
- Bryan Kemp (Destroy Destroy Destroy) – Additional Vocals
- Brad Moist – A&R, Additional Vocals
- Wayne Berry – Additional Vocals

Production

- Matt Goldman – Engineer
- Dan Shike – Mastering
- Jeremiah Scott – Mixing
