= The Hammering Process =

Studio album by Living Sacrifice
- Released: October 26, 2000
- Genre: Groove metal; Christian hardcore; nu metal
- Length: 42:57
- Label: Solid State
- Producer: Barry Poynter

Living Sacrifice chronology
Reborn (1997)	The Hammering Process (2000)	Conceived in Fire (2002)

Singles from The Hammering Process
- 1. "Bloodwork" / "Burn the End" Released: 2000

Professional ratings
Review scores
Source	Rating
AllMusic	4/5 stars
Cross Rhythms	9/10 stars
Exclaim!	Highly favorable
HM Magazine	
Jesusfreakhideout.com	4/5 stars
Matt Morrow	7/10 stars

The Hammering Process is the fifth album by the Christian metal band Living Sacrifice. This is the first album to feature percussionist Matthew Putman, guitarist Rocky Gray and bassist Arthur Green. The making of this album was featured in the Processed Tour DVD.

The song, "New Day", was written and recorded for this album, however, by the time the mixing came about, the band could not find the track. In 2010, while recording the process for The Infinite Order, the band discovered the lost track, with the song debuting in 2017, on a benefit compilation We Bear the Scars, for Timothy Henderson (formerly of Warlord).

== Track listing ==
1. "Flatline" – 3:20
2. "Bloodwork" – 4:14
3. "Not My Own" – 3:12
4. "Local Vengeance Killing" – 3:07
5. "Altered Life" – 4:46
6. "Hand of the Dead" – 3:33
7. "Burn the End" – 4:58
8. "Hidden" – 3:52
9. "Perfect" – 2:53
10. "Conditional" – 5:00

== Credits ==
Living Sacrifice

- Bruce Fitzhugh – vocals, rhythm guitar
- Lance Garvin – drums
- Rocky Gray – lead guitar
- Arthur Green – bass
- Matthew Putman – percussion, vocals

Production

- Barry Poynter – producer
