= Jason Truby =

American guitarist (born 1973)

- Born: June 1, 1973 (age 53)
- Genres: Christian metal; rock; acoustic; classical; jazz fusion; folk; country; Southern rock; fingerstyle; heavy metal; thrash metal
- Occupation: Guitarist
- Years active: 1989–present

Jason Truby (born June 1, 1973) is an American guitarist. He began his career in 1989 with Living Sacrifice as lead guitarist. He was also a member of P.O.D., but has also performed with Phil Keaggy, David Beegle, Ashley Cleveland and her husband Kenny Greenberg, and was a guest performer with Phil Keaggy's band Glass Harp at the First Annual Denver Guitar Festival.

== History ==
=== Living Sacrifice ===
In 1989, Truby joined Living Sacrifice with the other members being Bruce Fitzhugh, DJ Johnson, and Lance Garvin.

In 1991, Living Sacrifice's self-titled debut was released on R.E.X. Records. In 1992, Living Sacrifice released their second album, Nonexistent.

In 1994, the band released a third album, Inhabit Living Sacrifice signed onto Solid State Records seeking to widen their audience. In 1995, Johnson left the band and was replaced by Truby's older brother, Chris.

Living Sacrifice recorded Reborn, their Solid State debut, in 1997. The band started to play a mix of groove metal and metalcore. Reborn is considered the most influential of all Living Sacrifice records. In 1998, both Truby brothers left the band and were eventually replaced by Rocky Gray and Arthur Green.

=== P.O.D. ===
In 2003, P.O.D. lacked a guitarist after former band member Marcos Curiel parted with the band amidst controversy. Truby was available at the time and wrote and recorded the band's single, "Sleeping Awake", for The Matrix Reloaded Soundtrack album. He became a full-time member soon afterward.

The band released its first album with Truby, Payable on Death, in November 2003. It was the first time the band discarded its rap metal style, which sparked much controversy. Despite the new style, the album has sold over one million copies worldwide.

Truby also wrote the song "Truly Amazing" with P.O.D. for The Passion of the Christ: Songs album, which won a GMA Dove Award.

In 2005, POD released the Warriors 2 EP .

The second P.O.D. album with Truby, Testify, was produced by Glen Ballard and released in January 2006, including Katy Perry on background vocals on the song "Goodbye for Now". Later that year, P.O.D. released its Greatest Hits album, which was Truby's last work with the band.

On December 30, 2006, Truby left P.O.D.

=== Solo ===
Truby's first solo album was String Theory (2004), an acoustic album. Truby released his second album, also instrumental, Waiting on the Wind on November 20, 2007. On July 26, 2008, Truby announced a third solo acoustic album, Finding the Quiet, released on November 25. Truby completed his debut rock album, Entropy in 2009. In 2011, he released an acoustic Christmas album entitled The Greatest Love.

Truby produced a compilation album in 2012 for a non-profit adoption and foster care organization called Project Zero. This album entitled "Grafted" featured Truby, Stu G from Delirious?, Sonny Sandoval from P.O.D., Cheri Keaggy, Phil Keaggy, Steve Dean, Tiffany Thornton, Geoff Moore, Willet, The Roys (2010 bluegrass band of the year), Caitlin Evanson, Sean Michel.

In 2012, Truby released an acoustic driven vocal album called Our Time Here a fingerstyle album with songs featuring artist Phil Keaggy.

Truby's instrumental, Passages, was released in 2013 and features Phil Keaggy. 2016 Truby was commissioned to do an instrumental guitar album, Hymns, consisting of his fingerstyle arrangements of ancient hymns. It has been distributed to cancer treatment centers to give to patients and families undergoing cancer treatments.

Truby is currently working on an instrumental Christmas album.

== Discography ==
With Living Sacrifice

- Not Yielding to Ungodly demo (1989)
- Living Sacrifice (1991)
- Nonexistent (1992)
- Inhabit (1994)
- Reborn (1997)
- In Memoriam (2005) (Greatest Hits)

With P.O.D.

- The Matrix Reloaded: The Album (2003)
- Payable on Death (2003)
- The Passion of the Christ: Songs (2004)
- The Warriors EP, Volume 2 (2005)
- Testify (2006)
- Greatest Hits: The Atlantic Years (2006)

Solo

- String Theory (2005) – instrumental
- Waiting on the Wind (2007) – instrumental
- Finding the Quiet (2008) – instrumental
- Entropy (2009)
- The Greatest Love (2011) – Christmas album
- Our Time Here (2012)
- Passages (2013) – instrumental
- Hymns (2016) – instrumental
- All is Calm (2017) – instrumental
- The Day of Our Redemption (2018)
- Islands in Time (2019) – Best of
- Mapping the Invisible (2020) – instrumental

Other projects

- Grafted (Project Zero) (2012)

Credits

- The Infinite Order by Living Sacrifice (2010) (Lead guitar on track 5)
