= Blood in the Gears =

Studio album by The Showdown
- Released: August 24, 2010
- Genre: Christian metalcore, Southern metal, groove metal
- Length: 43:53
- Label: Solid State/Tooth & Nail
- Producer: Jeremiah Scott

The Showdown chronology
Back Breaker (2008)	Blood in the Gears (2010)

Blood in the Gears is the fourth album from American Christian metal band The Showdown. It's their second album with Solid State Records. Released on August 24, 2010, the album was recorded at Anthem Productions in Nashville, Tennessee, and produced by the band's bassist, Jeremiah Scott.

The title track was released as a single.

== Reception ==
PopMatters reviewer Chris Colgan called the album "a pinnacle in The Showdown's career because they have both cemented their sound and managed to experiment with new ideas and influences at the same time". Jesusfreakhideout.com gave it three and a half stars, with Timothy Estabrooks calling it "an album with the occasional high point, but not enough consistency to be memorable".

== Charts ==
The album peaked at number 21 on Billboard's 'Top Christian Albums' chart.

== Track listing ==
No.	Title	Length
1.	"The Man Named Hell" (featuring Riley Anglen)	4:16
2.	"Heavy Lies the Crown"	3:23
3.	"Bring It Down"	2:15
4.	"Take Me Home"	5:24
5.	"Blood in the Gears"	4:07
6.	"Dogma Enthroned"	3:10
7.	"No Escape"	3:58
8.	"The Crooked Path"	3:26
9.	"Graveyard of Empires" (featuring Chris Bazor of Destroy Destroy Destroy)	4:10
10.	"Diggin' My Own Grave" (featuring Riley Anglen)	5:42

Bonus tracks
No.	Title	Length
11.	"Wolven Throne" (featuring Cody Richardson)	3:52
12.	"Evil Eye"	3:55
13.	"Apocalypse Horde"	4:21

== Personnel ==
The Showdown

- David Bunton – vocals
- Josh Childers – guitar, backing vocals, gang vocals
- Patrick Judge – guitar, backing vocals
- Jeremiah Scott – bass, backing vocals, gang vocals
- Timothy "Yogi" Watts – drums

Additional musicians

- Riley Anglen – guest backing vocals on "The Man Named Hell" & "Diggin' My Own Grave", gang vocals
- Chris Bazor – guest lead vocals on "Graveyard of Empires", gang vocals
- Cody Richardson – additional guest lead vocals, gang vocals
- Brian Shorter – gang vocals

Production

- Jon Dunn – A&R
- Invisible Creature – art direction
- Ryan Clark – design
- Steve Blackmon – mixed by
- Jerad Knudson – photography
- Ethan Luck – photography
- Jeremiah Scott – producer, engineer, editing
- Troy Gelssner - mastering
