= Temptation Come My Way =

Studio album by the Showdown
- Released: February 20, 2007
- Studio: Seven Four Seven Studios, Memphis, Tennessee
- Genre: Southern metal, heavy metal, Christian metal, groove metal
- Length: 48:42
- Label: Mono vs Stereo
- Producer: Paul Ebersold

The Showdown chronology
| A Chorus of Obliteration (2004) | Temptation Come My Way (2007) | Back Breaker (2008) |

Professional ratings
Review scores
| Source | Rating |
|---|---|
| AllMusic | 3.5/5 stars |
| HM | 3/5 |
| Metal Hammer | 7/10 stars |

Temptation Come My Way is the Showdown's second album. It features a more focused sound than their previous album, which was a fusion of various heavy metal genres. The sound of Temptation Come My Way is southern rock combined with more traditional heavy metal. It is also the last album to feature Andrew Hall, before being replaced by former Still Remains drummer AJ Barrette.

A clean edition of the album was distributed that removes the track "Fanatics and Whores", sold in Family Christian Stores or Lifeway stores. The edition is also sold by online distributor Zambooie, even though it has the original edition's track listing in their product description.

== Track listing ==
All tracks are written by David Bunton and Travis Bailey, except where noted.

| No. | Title | Writer(s) | Length |
|---|---|---|---|
| 1. | "Fanatics and Whores" (removed on clean edition) | | 3:18 |
| 2. | "Head Down" | | 4:19 |
| 3. | "Six Feet Under" | Bunton, Bailey, Paul Ebersold | 4:54 |
| 4. | "We Die Young" | | 4:18 |
| 5. | "Breath of the Swamp" | | 3:16 |
| 6. | "It Drinks from Me" | | 4:36 |
| 7. | "Temptation Come My Way" | | 4:12 |
| 8. | "Forget My Name" | | 4:22 |
| 9. | "Spitting In the Wind" | | 3:15 |
| 10. | "I, Victim (Here's to the Year)" | | 3:43 |
| 11. | "Carry On Wayward Son" (Kansas cover) | Kerry Livgren | 4:21 |
| 12. | "Death Finds Us Breathing" | | 4:11 |

Best Buy bonus track
| No. | Title | Length |
|---|---|---|
| 13. | "Snake in the Grass" | 2:39 |

iTunes and Century Media Europe bonus track
| No. | Title | Length |
|---|---|---|
| 13. | "Feel Like Hell" | 4:03 |

== Credits ==
The Showdown

- David Bunton – Vocals
- Josh Childers – Guitar
- Travis Bailey – Guitar
- A. J. Barrette – Drums
- Eric Korshack – Bass

Production

- Adam Deane – Assistant
- Scott Hardin – Engineer, backing vocals
- Paul Ebersold – Engineer, producer
- J.R. McNeely – Mixing
- Brad Moist – A&R
- Clark Orr – Design
- Dan Shike – Mastering
- Steve Blackmon – Assistant
