= Living Sacrifice (1991 album) =

Studio album by Living Sacrifice
- Released: 1991; 1999 (re-release); April 23, 2021 (remastered re-release)
- Studios: Catamount Studios in Cedar Falls, Iowa
- Genres: Christian metal, thrash metal
- Length: 44:39
- Labels: R.E.X., Solid State, Nordic Mission
- Producers: Kurt Bachman, Doug Mann

Living Sacrifice chronology
Living Sacrifice (1991)	Nonexistent (1992)

Living Sacrifice is the debut studio album by the Christian metal band of the same name, released through R.E.X. Records in 1991. The album exhibited a more thrash metal feel, which was the band's original style. They have switched to a death metal sound in their next two albums before the groove metal/metalcore style they are later known for.

== Recording history ==
Living Sacrifice formed in 1989 in Little Rock, Arkansas, and released a three-song demo cassette tape, Not Yielding to Ungodly, in 1990. After getting signed to R.E.X. Records, the band mixed and recorded their debut album at Catamount Studios in Cedar Falls, Iowa, which was released in 1991. In 1999, Solid State Records released a reissue of the album. In 2021, Nordic Mission re-released Living Sacrifice with remastered audio for its 30th anniversary.

== Critical reception ==
Professional ratings
Review scores
Source	Rating
AllMusic	3/5 stars
Jesus Freak Hideout	4/5 stars
The Phantom Tollbooth	4.5/5 stars

The album received mixed to positive ratings, with the band being heavily compared to Slayer. Jesus Freak Hideout reviewed the 1999 re-release of the album, giving it a 3.5 star review and stating that "Any fan of metal or Living Sacrifice looking to learn a little metal history would be wise to enroll in Living Sacrifice's self-titled debut." Steve Huey of AllMusic wrote "Living Sacrifice are still honing their style, but the record has a raw bite that will please most death metal fans, even if the subject matter isn't the traditional fare.", giving the album a 3 out of 5-star review.

== Track listing ==
All lyrics are written by Living Sacrifice; all music is composed by Living Sacrifice.

No.	Title	Length
1.	"Violence"	3:13
2.	"Internal Unrest"	5:24
3.	"Second Death^{[a]}^{1}"	3:52
4.	"Obstruction^{[b]}^{1}"	5:31
5.	"Walls of Separation"	4:14
6.	"Phargx Imas"	3:54
7.	"No Grave Concern"	4:46
8.	"Dealing with Ignorance"	5:14
9.	"The Prodigal"	3:44
10.	"Anorexia Spiritual^{[b]}"	4:42
Total length:		44:39

^{a} Re-recorded song from Not Yielding to Ungodly demo (1990)
^{b} Song included on Living Sacrifice's In Memoriam compilation (2005)

== Personnel ==
Living Sacrifice

- Darren "DJ" Johnson – vocals, bass guitar
- Bruce Fitzhugh – rhythm guitars
- Jason Truby – lead guitars
- Lance Garvin – drums

Production

- Kurt Bachman – production
- Doug Mann – production
- John Thomson – engineering, mixing
- Tom Tatman – engineering, mixing

Additional personnel

- Jeff Spencer – art direction, design, photo manipulations
- Sudden Images – art direction, design
- Library of Congress – cover photo

== Notes ==
^{1.} "Second Death" and "Obstruction" were combined into a single track on the original 1991 version.
