= Wild Blood (album) =

Studio album by Lovedrug
- Released: March 6, 2012
- Genre: Indie rock
- Length: 42:55
- Producer: Paul Moak

Lovedrug chronology
The Sucker Punch Show (2008)	Wild Blood (2012)	Pretend You're Alive - 10 Year Anniversary Edition: Rarities (2014)

Professional ratings
Review scores
Source	Rating
Absolute Punk	(73%)
Alternative Press	3/5 stars

Wild Blood is the fourth album by the American alternative/indie rock band, Lovedrug. It was released on March 6, 2012.

The first two singles from the album were released as the split-single Pink Champagne / Dinosaur on September 6, 2011. The music video for Dinosaur, written and directed by Michael Shepard, was premiered by Filter (magazine) the following week. The album was produced and engineered by Paul Moak at The Smoakstack. The band toured extensively before and after the album release, performing over 50 dates in North America from February through May 2012, and including direct support from The Last Royals, Kingsfoil, and others.

== Track listing ==
No.	Title	Length
1.	"Wild Blood"	3:20
2.	"Dinosaur"	4:08
3.	"Premonition"	4:15
4.	"Pink Champagne"	3:56
5.	"Girl"	3:49
6.	"Ladders"	4:26
7.	"Great Divide"	4:12
8.	"Your Country"	3:04
9.	"We Were Owls"	3:56
10.	"Revival"	3:10
11.	"Anodyne"	4:34
Total length:		42:50
