= Arthur Green (musician) =

American bassist

- Birth name: Arthur Chester Green
- Born: October 3 Philippines
- Origin: United States
- Genres: Christian metal, mathcore, metalcore, heavy metal, death metal, hardcore punk
- Occupation: Musician
- Instrument: Bass
- Years active: 1995–2006, 2008–present

Arthur Chester Green is the fourth and current bassist for the American extreme metal band Living Sacrifice. He, along with brothers Cory Brandan Putman and Matthew Putman, also founded the mathcore band Eso-Charis.

== History ==
Green was born in the Philippines, with his father being an American citizen in the U.S. military. Growing up in the U.S., Green would play bass in a few punk bands in the Arkansas area. After meeting Cory Brandan Putman and Matthew Putman, the three formed a band called Funnel. In 1995, Green formed Elliot, with Cory on vocals, Matt on drums, and Matt Depper on guitars. They recorded the EP The Plateau Green before Depper quit. Jayson Holmes took over guitars and the band changed their name to Eso-Charis. The band recorded Eso-Charis, which was released through Seize the Day Records, founded by Bruce Fitzhugh. After the album was released and pressed, the band went on tour with Living Sacrifice and Embodyment. The band would also record a 7" Setting Roots for Winter before Green and Matt Putman quit.

After quitting, Green and the Putman brothers went on to join Living Sacrifice, (at separate times) while Holmes went on to form The Handshake Murders. Cory later went on to join Norma Jean. Green and Matt Putman recorded The Hammering Process and Conceived In Fire before LS disbanded. Though LS disbanded, Green continued working Lance Garvin and Rocky Gray with their death metal side project Soul Embraced, touring with them as their bassist, alongside John LeCompt on guitars and Chad Moore on vocals. Living Sacrifice reformed in 2008, with the line-up of Green, Bruce Fitzhugh, Rocky Gray, and Lance Garvin. They recorded Death Machine (2008), The Infinite Order (2010), and most recently, Ghost Thief (2013). The band is currently recording new music.

== Bands ==
Current

- Living Sacrifice (1999–2003, 2008–present; Bass, Backing Vocals)

Former

- Funnel (Bass)
- Elliot (1995–1997; Bass)
- Eso-Charis (1997–2000; Bass)

Live

- Soul Embraced (1999–2006; Bass)

Timeline

== Discography ==
With Elliot/Eso-Charis

- The Plateau Green (1997)
- Eso-Charis (1998)
- Setting Roots for the Winter (2000)

With Living Sacrifice

- The Hammering Process (2000)
- Subtle Alliance (2002)
- Conceived in Fire (2002)
- In Memoriam (2005)
- Death Machine (2008)
- The Infinite Order (2010)
- Ghost Thief (2013)

Other Appearances

- This Is My Blood by Soul Embraced (Live Bass)
- Blessed Be This Killing by Various (w/ Eso-Charis)
- Burning Bridges by Haste the Day (Backing Vocals)
