= Bruce Fitzhugh =

American musician

- Born: Bruce Patrick Fitzhugh
- Origin: Little Rock, Arkansas, U.S.
- Genres: Christian metal, heavy metal
- Occupations: Singer, musician, record producer
- Instruments: Vocals, guitar
- Years active: 1989–2003, 2005, 2008-present
- Labels: Seize the Day, Solid State, XS

Bruce Patrick Fitzhugh is an American musician. He is the second lead vocalist, rhythm guitarist and founding member of Arkansas's Christian metal band Living Sacrifice. The lead vocalist role was left to Bruce shortly after the departure of Darren Johnson and prior to the recording of Living Sacrifice's 1997 album, Reborn. Fitzhugh is featured in Zao's The Lesser Lights of Heaven DVD. Fitzhugh's nephew is Drew Garrison, Vocalist for Descended From Wolves and Becoming Saints.

He has been involved in many other music endeavors such as producing The Showdown's 2004 debut album, A Chorus Of Obliteration. He also produced albums for Zao, Further Seems Forever, Few Left Standing, and Eso-Charis. He is also a guest vocalist on Demon Hunter's album Storm the Gates of Hell on the song "Sixteen".

In 2015, Fitzhugh stated in an interview with Mark Salomon, that Living Sacrifice is currently writing new music. Fitzhugh, along with Demon Hunter guitarist and Showdown bassist, Jeremiah Scott, wrote two songs titled "Made for War" and "Defend the Crown" for the Killing Floor 2 Soundtrack. In 2015, Fitzhugh, along with Travis Turner (ex-Aletheian, Solamors) and Alex Kenis (ex-Becoming the Archetype, Aletheian, Solamors), recorded a cover of Megadeth's "Holy Wars... The Punishment Due" cover in honor of the 25th anniversary of the song.

Fitzhugh owned a label titled: "Seize the Day Records". Fitzhugh formed the company, Zambooie with Mike Lewis (Puller, For Love Not Lisa) and later Billy Power (Blenderhead) and currently works at Manhead Merch.

== History ==
Bruce Fitzhugh began his musical career in 1989, joining Darren Johnson and Lance Garvin in the band Living Sacrifice. The three would be joined by Jason Truby on lead guitars. Fitzhugh and Johnson became friends during high school and Fitzhugh became friends with Garvin shortly thereafter. The band's first show was on December 1, 1989 in front of a hall of nurses. Living Sacrifice would record a demo, titled Not Yielding to Ungodly, with Fitzhugh performing rhythm guitars, which was released in 1990. The demo was influenced by early Slayer, drawing from thrash metal influences. The demo would get into the hands of Kurt Bachman and Joey Daub of Believer, which led to the band signing with R.E.X. Records. In 1991, the band would enter the studio to record their debut self-titled album, which would be released through R.E.X. as the band's label debut.

Around 1992, the band would switch styles with Johnson switching to a guttural vocal style and Garvin incorporating blast beats. In this new death metal style, the band entered the studio to record Nonexistent, with the band driving all the way from Little Rock, Arkansas to Nashville, Tennessee. During the recording process, Fitzhugh and the other members were upset with the engineer who was hired for the record, which led to them asking him to step aside. With this in mind, Fitzhugh and the members of Living Sacrifice began to engineer the record and mixed their record at that time. Fitzhugh also was not a fan of Johnson's change in vocal style, however, by the next release, his style adjusted. In 1994, the band released Inhabit, which was recorded in Pennsylvania with Daub and Bachman. The band had left on Christmas Day in 1993 and began recording on December 27 until early 1993. Following the release, the band came to the realization that R.E.X. was not paying them their royalties, which led to a confrontation that resulted in the band being released from their contract and owning the rights to their first three albums. In 1995, Johnson departed from the band. Not wanting to bring anyone new in as their vocalist, Fitzhugh and Truby would both try for the position. However, Truby would lose his voice, while Fitzhugh's continued to get better. With this in mind, and still requiring a bassist, the three would hire Chris Truby as their bassist, Jason's older brother.

Taking time to record their demo with this new lineup, featuring four-songs, including "Spirit Fall", "Sellout", "Reborn", and "Awakening". The band would record Reborn, their fourth and most impactful release, at this time. Brandon Ebel of Tooth & Nail Records would create Solid State Records at this time and sign Living Sacrifice as their first artist. Fitzhugh would debut on vocals and the band's style changed exponentially, aiming towards a more metalcore style. The album was released in 1997 through Solid State Records, being the label's fourth official release, behind Overcome's When Beauty Dies, Strongarm's Advent of a Miracle, and Zao's The Splinter Shards the Birth of Separation. The band would record at Barry Poynter's studio in Arkansas, which all the members were onboard with rather than having to drive to different states to record. In 1998, Fitzhugh would produce Zao's Where Blood and Fire Bring Rest at Poynter's studio, which would also be released through Solid State Records. Fitzhugh would also make his first guest appearance on Embodyment's Embrace the Eternal. Fitzhugh also produced the band Eso-Charis' debut album. To release the album for Eso-Charis, Fitzhugh created the record label Seize the Day Records. While on tour, Living Sacrifice, Eso-Charis, and Embodyment, during a stop in California, Fitzhugh and Eso-Charis picked up their CDs from Wuv Bernardo of P.O.D.

By the end of 1998, the Truby brothers departed from the band, which led to Fitzhugh and Garvin hiring on Cory Putman and Jay Stacy on guitars and bass respectively for a time, with the permanent position being filled by Rocky Gray (ex-Shredded Corpse) and Arthur Green (ex-Eso-Charis). Andrew Godwin (Embodyment) would initially be asked by Fitzhugh, however, he could not move from Texas to Arkansas. With Gray and Green on board, the band would also hire on Cory's brother, Matt Putman as an additional percussionist. At this time, Fitzhugh produced metallic hardcore band, Few Left Standing, for their debut album Regeneration of Self. According to Vocalist Chris Stafford, the band likely made Fitzhugh mad during the process, which is why he did not produce their second effort. The five members of Living Sacrifice would begin working on their fifth album, titled The Hammering Process, which would be released in late 2000. The album would be well-received, and like their album before, Reborn, was both released through Solid State and would be credited for being a forefather of the predominant genre, in this case groove metal. Fitzhugh's vocal range would become even lower than Reborn at this time. Two years later, Living Sacrifice would begin recording their sixth album, Conceived in Fire. At the time, Fitzhugh was unimpressed with it but was happy how it turned out in the end. Fitzhugh would begin to get burnt out on the band at this time and felt a need to remain home with his family and be involved with his children growing up.

By 2002, Fitzhugh began the label XS Records alongside former Puller and For Love Not Lisa member Mike Lewis, which would release records from Echocast, Stavesacre, Josh Todd, and Embodyment. On the Embodyment album, Songs for the Living, Fitzhugh was A&R for the record. Fitzhugh began to transition full-control to Garvin. Gray had departed to join Evanescence as their drummer, while Cory Putman returned as a guitarist. The initial plan was for Cory to take over vocals following Fitzhugh's departure and for Bryan Gray (The Blamed, ex-Left Out, ex-Six Feet Deep, ex-Blenderhead) to join on lead guitars. However, during Fitzhugh's final tour, Garvin decided to break the band up, with all the members going their separate ways in 2003. Following their disbanding, Fitzhugh would work on melodic death metal and southern metal band The Showdown's debut album, A Chorus of Obliteration, as a producer, with the album being released through Solid State. In 2005, Living Sacrifice released a compilation In Memoriam, which saw Fitzhugh, Gray, and Garvin reunite to record three new songs.

After the breakup, Fitzhugh and his former business partner and labelmate Mike Lewis would create the merchandise company known as Zambooie. Billy Power of Blenderhead would also join the company as a business owner. The company would hire several people in the music industry or who would go on into the music industry, most notably Andy Atkins of A Plea for Purging. In 2007, Fitzhugh produced another album by Further Seems Forever, former members of Strongarm, for their third album, The Final Curtain. In 2008, Living Sacrifice would reunite with Fitzhugh returning to the helm of vocals and rhythm guitars, with Gray returning on lead guitars, Green on bass, and Garvin on drums. With this reunion, the band recorded a two-song EP, Death Machine, which would be released independently.

Re-signing with Solid State, the band began working on a new album, which would be titled The Infinite Order, which would be produced by their longtime friend Jeremiah Scott (Demon Hunter, The Showdown, Destroy Destroy Destroy) and mixed by Andy Sneap (Hell). In 2013, the band would release their eight studio album, Ghost Thief, which also saw Scott producing the record again. In 2015, Tripwire Interactive, a video game company owned by John Gibson, released the video game Killing Floor 2, with the soundtrack featuring several Living Sacrifice tracks, including a re-recorded version of "Something More" off of Reject. Fitzhugh and Scott would also write two songs, "Made for War" and "Defend the Crown", exclusively for the video game release. In 2020, Living Sacrifice planned a release for their 30th anniversary of a documentary of the band, which would also see a show with them and The Blamed, with members of the current lineup and former lineups performing, as well as Mark Garza of Embodyment and The Famine. However, due to the Coronavirus pandemic, the release and show was postponed. In 2024, it was announced Fitzhugh would be performing vocals for Extol at their performance at Furnace Fest.

== Discography ==
With Living Sacrifice

- Not Yielding to Ungodly Demo (1989)
- Living Sacrifice (1991)
- Nonexistent (1992)
- Metamorphosis (1993)
- Inhabit (1994)
- Living Sacrifice '95 Demo (1995)
- Reborn (1997)
- The Hammering Process (2000)
- Subtle Alliance (2002)
- Conceived in Fire (2002)
- In Memoriam (2005)
- Death Machine (2008)
- The Infinite Order (2010)
- Ghost Thief (2013)

As Bruce Fitzhugh & Jeremiah Scott

- "Made for War" (2015)
- "Defend the Crown" (2015)

As Megabruce

- "Holy Wars... The Punishment Due" (2015; Originally performed by Megadeth)

Guest vocals

- "Religious Infamy" on the album Embrace the Eternal by Embodyment (1998)
- "Tear Us Apart" on the album Flesh & Blood by No Innocent Victim (1999)
- "Lies" on the demo album Origin by Evanescence (2000)
- "Breathing Murder" on the album Inhabit, by Living Sacrifice, covered by Aletheian (2002, Live)
- "Dagon Undone – The Reckoning" on the album A Chorus Of Obliteration by The Showdown (2004)
- "Sixteen" on the album Storm the Gates of Hell by Demon Hunter (2007)
- "The Electric Boogaloo" on the album Danza II: Electric Boogaloo by The Tony Danza Tapdance Extravaganza (2007)
- "S.O.T.S." on the album Wait for the Siren by Project 86 (2012)
- “Transhuman” on the album Mythos by Soul Embraced (2013)
- "The Mountain" on the album Possession by Benea Reach (2013)
- "The Escapist" the single, by Broken by the Burden (2014)
- "Lost" on the album Oh, the Suffering, by Becoming Saints (2016)
- "Skin Crawl" (feat. Daniel Weyandt of Zao and Brian "Head" Welch of Korn) on the album It's Not Easy Being Human, by Islander (2022)
- "Hymn to Marduk II" on the album The Black Nativity by A Hill to Die Upon (2023)

Production

- Where Blood and Fire Bring Rest - Zao (1998)
- Eso-Charis - Eso-Charis (1998)
- Regeneration of Self - Few Left Standing (1999)
- Songs for the Living - Embodyment (2002)
- A Chorus of Obliteration - The Showdown (2004)
- The Final Curtain - Further Seems Forever (2007)
