= Reborn (Living Sacrifice album) =

Studio album by Living Sacrifice
- Released: November 4, 1997
- Recorded: January 1997
- Studio: Poynter's Palace, Little Rock, Arkansas
- Genre: Christian metal; thrash metal; metalcore; death metal
- Length: 48:32
- Label: Solid State
- Producer: Barry Poynter

Living Sacrifice chronology
Inhabit (1994)	Reborn (1997)	The Hammering Process (2000)

Professional ratings
Review scores
Source	Rating
AllMusic	3/5 stars
Jesus Freak Hideout	4/5 stars
Cross Rhythms	10/10 stars

Reborn is the fourth album by the Christian metal band Living Sacrifice. The album was released in 1997, and later re-released and remastered in 2004. In 2020, the band announce a vinyl re-release of Reborn, which sold out quickly.

== Critical reception ==
Reborn saw a drastic separation from their previous style, dropping most of the death metal sound of Nonexistent and Inhabit, in favor of more of a metalcore and hardcore punk sound. The album was well-received by the metalcore and hardcore scene, whereas the death metal scene predominantly disregarded it. The album is widely considered as Living Sacrifice's biggest album.

Stephen Thomas Erwine of AllMusic wrote "...the average metal fan will find much here of interest, particularly the pummeling riffs and shredding solos." Fred Keel of Jesus Freak Hideout stated "Reborn is a Christian metal masterpiece recommended for fans of Demon Hunter and Becoming the Archetype." Alex Figgis of Cross Rhythms, for the review of the original Reborn album, gave 10/10 and reported "They leave the listener in no doubt as to their heartfelt desire to share the gospel with those who have ears to hear; tacking the wisdom of the world head on with the seemingly foolishness "I God in Christ, with us much subtlety as a sledge hammer." Tony Cummings, also of Cross Rhythms reviewing the reissue, also gave the album 10/10. "For more enlightened hard rock lovers, here's a chance to hear again a Christian hard music classic in all its brutal glory and catch that master guitarist, Jason Truby, in pre-P.O.D. days, in the process." There were also several reviews from Cornerstone Magazine, Garlic Press, HM Magazine, 7Ball, and YouthWorker.

== Track listing ==
All music is composed by Living Sacrifice.

No.	Title	Length
1.	"Reborn Empowered"	3:48
2.	"Truth Solution"	4:59
3.	"Threatened"	5:08
4.	"Awakening"	4:06
5.	"180"	4:55
6.	"No Longer"	4:47
7.	"Something More"	3:37
8.	"Sellout"	3:39
9.	"Spirit Fall"	3:48
10.	"Presence of God"	3:44
11.	"Reject"	3:34
12.	"Liar"	2:27
Total length:		48:32

== Personnel ==
Living Sacrifice

- Bruce Fitzhugh - vocals, rhythm guitar
- Jason Truby - lead guitar, backing vocals
- Chris Truby - bass guitar
- Lance Garvin - drums, percussion

Production

- Barry Poynter - recording, engineer, mixing
- Brandon Ebel - executive producer
- Shuji Kobayashi - layout concept, cover concept, photography
- Claire - layout
