= Mindrage =

American Christian metal band

- Origin: Little Rock, Arkansas U.S.
- Genres: Christian metal, Christian hardcore, groove metal, metalcore, hardcore punk
- Years active: 1997–2002
- Labels: Pluto, Bulletproof
- Past members: John LeCompt; Nick Williams; Justin Carder; Chad Wilburn

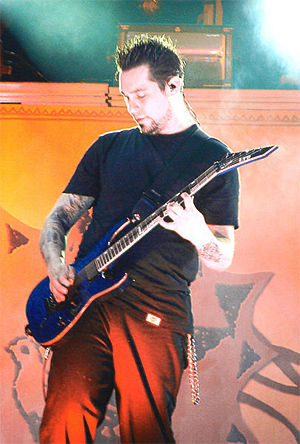
John Lecompt

Mindrage was an American Christian metal band from Little Rock, Arkansas. In 2002, the band broke up.

== Members ==
Last known lineup

- John LeCompt – vocals, guitar (1997–2002)
- Nick Williams – bass (1997–2002)
- Justin Carder – drums (1999–2002)

Former members

- Chad Wilburn – drums (1997–1999)

== Discography ==
Studio albums
Year	Title	Label
June 1, 1999	Sown in Weakness, Raised in Power	Bulletproof

EPs
Year	Title	Label
January 16, 2001	Mindrage & Nailed Promise	Pluto Records

Demo

- Mindrage Demo (1997)

Other songs

- "Haven of Blasphemy" by Living Sacrifice (cover version)
