= The Showdown (band) =

American Christian metal band

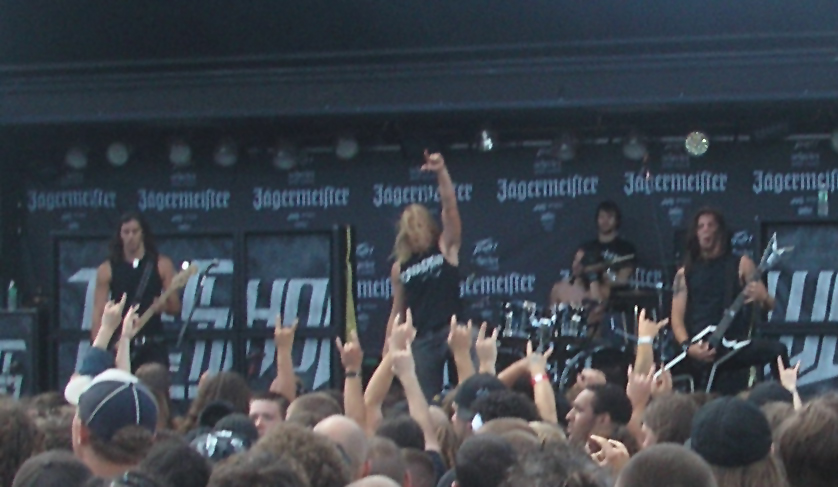
- The Showdown at Ozzfest 2007

Background information
- Also known as: 2540 (1999–2004)
- Origin: Elizabethton, Tennessee, U.S.
- Genres: Metalcore, Southern metal, Christian metal, groove metal
- Years active: 1999–2011 (hiatus), 2022–present
- Labels: Mono Vs Stereo, Solid State
- Members: David Bunton; Josh Childers; Travis Bailey; Eric Koruschak; Andrew Hall
- Past members: AJ Barrette; Timothy "Yogi" Watts; Jeremy Swain; Daniel Swain; Kyle Kneller; Jeremiah Scott; Patrick Judge; Isaac Harris
- Website: The Showdown on Facebook

The Showdown is an American heavy metal band from Elizabethton, Tennessee. While the members of the band are Christian and the band is signed to a Christian record label, the band does not consider itself a Christian act, according to guitarist Josh Childers, while in an interview with vocalist David Bunton, when asked about a Christian metal band, answered without correcting the interviewer. Lyrically, their writing tells of heroism, sojourns and battles of life, most of which is influenced by Biblical aspects. As of 2008, they are signed to Solid State Records. The band was originally called 2540 from 1999 to 2004.

== History ==
=== A Chorus of Obliteration ===
Prior to becoming The Showdown, the group was known as 2540, and played in a punk rock style. Over time, influences from metal fan Josh saw 2540 morph from punk to metal. This change in style prompted a change of the band's name to "The Showdown". In 2003, Daniel left the band to get married at which time Andrew Hall took the drumming position. With Andrew on board the fivesome headed to the studio and recorded their first full-length album A Chorus of Obliteration. This album, produced by Bruce Fitzhugh, lead singer of Living Sacrifice, was mainly a mix of Hardcore and Metal.

=== Temptation Come My Way ===
After a great deal of touring in both the US and Europe, The Showdown went back to the studio to record their second full-length album. This album took a different direction trading in the screaming double-bassing death metal for a more southern approach mixed with elements of their older style such as heavy guitar riffs, some screams (although not as dominated by them), and distinct bass and drum lines, drawing also from 1980s to early 1990s-era metal like Pantera, Iron Maiden, Megadeth, and Metallica. In the fall of 2006, The Showdown joined the Christian rock/alternative band Pillar on The Days of the Reckoning tour. The tour lasted from mid-October through November 2006 and also featured Christian rock bands Day of Fire and Decyfer Down. In late 2006, after completing the album, Andrew announced he was leaving the band(and possibly to pursue a career in professional wrestling). Andrew was soon replaced by another Andrew - A.J. Barrette of Still Remains. Although the album was already completed, The Showdown along with A.J. hit the studio once more to record the track "Head Down" which would be added to the album before its release. The completed album, Temptation Come My Way was released on February 20, 2007. Unknown to the public until release, two different versions were released, one with the song "Fanatics and Whores", and one without, probably to avoid controversy in the Christian market. This upset many fans who had pre-ordered the CD and received the incomplete album, even though most distributors listed the song in their track listing. Temptation Come My Way received high popularity in the underground culture, and The Showdown was soon signed on March 21, 2007, to play at Ozzfest 07.

=== Back Breaker ===
After extensive touring and popular reception, the band announced on their MySpace page that they had begun recording their next album in January 2008. On April 19, 2008, the Showdown completed their new album entitled Back Breaker. Back Breaker was released on August 19, 2008, with a style that is sort of a mix of their first two albums, along with the addition of a heavy groove style. Following the release they joined Shadows Fall on tour to promote Back Breaker. The Showdown released Back Breaker through Solid State Records. The Showdown toured with Norma Jean on The Anti-Mother Tour, which lasted throughout October and November 2008 and also featured Haste The Day, Mychildren Mybride, Children 18:3, and Oh, Sleeper. Children 18:3 was only on half of the tour dates (October 3 to 26), while Oh, Sleeper filled in for the rest of the tour (October 28 to November 15). On April 13, 2009, the band announced that AJ (drums) and Eric (bass) would be leaving the band in order to spend more time with their families and other responsibilities. They were replaced by Timothy "Yogi" Watts of Demon Hunter on drums, and Jeremiah Scott of Destroy Destroy Destroy on bass. However, it was stated that AJ and Eric will rejoin the band for a show at the Ichthus Music Festival on June 13; however it did not happen. During the Ichthus Music Festival, Patrick Judge, new guitarist of acclaimed band Demon Hunter, took on the second guitar as a "fill in", according to Josh. His position in The Showdown is unknown, but he has toured with them extensively since then. Jeremiah Scott unofficially stated he will be on both The Showdown's next record, along with Demon Hunter's as well, also revealing Patrick's new endorsement with Dean Guitars, after being endorsed by Washburn Guitars.

=== Blood in the Gears, hiatus and reunion ===
The Showdown's latest album is titled Blood in the Gears. On March 17, 2010, David posted on his Facebook page that The Showdown had finished recording Blood in the Gears and that they were hoping for a summer release. Blood in the Gears was released August 24, 2010.

Teaming up with Timothy "Yogi" Watts of Demon Hunter, The Showdown began recording their next album, Blood in the Gears. Lyrically, the album is closest to Temptation Come My Way, as the majority of the songs return to issues of life such as consumption ("The Crooked Path") and honoring God ("Bring it Down"). Musically, the band again changed its sound from that of its previous album. A heavy tone is kept for most of the album, led by the screamed vocals of David Bunton. However, the band takes a much more melodic approach on "Take Me Home" and "Diggin' My Own Grave", using a slow tempo and singing.

Since early 2011 the band has been on an indefinite hiatus until 2017, when they started to post snippets from the studio on their Facebook page teasing recording of the new material. Since 2018 the band has sporadically made festival and one off appearances. In 2025 lead vocalist David Bunton joined death metal christian band Hope Deferred.

== Members ==
Current

- David Bunton – lead vocals (2002–2011)
- Josh Childers – guitar, backing vocals (2002–2011)
- Jeremiah Scott – bass, backing vocals (Demon Hunter, Destroy Destroy Destroy) (2009–2011)
- Patrick Judge – guitar, backing vocals (Demon Hunter, Bleeding Through) (2008–2011)
- Isaac Harris – drums (2010–2011)
- Nathan Merrick - guitar, backing vocals (2022-present)

Former

- Travis Bailey – guitar, backing vocals (2002–2008)
- Andrew Hall – drums (2003–2006) (Destroy Destroy Destroy, Rifles at Recess)
- Daniel Swain – drums, backing vocals (2002–2003)
- AJ Barrette – drums (Still Remains) (2006–2009)
- Eric Koruschak – bass (2002–2009)
- Timothy "Yogi" Watts – drums (Demon Hunter) (2009–2010)

Timeline

== Discography ==
Title	Release date	Label	Billboard 200	US sales
A Chorus of Obliteration	November 16, 2004; November 14, 2006 (re-release)	Mono Vs Stereo	—	40,000+
Temptation Come My Way	February 20, 2007	Mono Vs Stereo	191	80,000+
Feel Like Hell EP	September 18, 2007	Mono Vs Stereo	—	—
Back Breaker	August 19, 2008	Solid State Records		25,000+
Blood in the Gears	August 24, 2010	Solid State Records	—	—

- The Showdown has also recorded a cover of "So Help Me God", by Christian hip hop dc Talk, which appears on the compilation album Freaked! A Gotee Tribute to dc Talk's Jesus Freak.
- In the 2006, European version of A Chorus of Obliteration, "Give Us This Day" was included as a bonus track and is also featured in the 2008 American release of Back Breaker.
- In 2010, David Bunton contributed to Living Sacrifice's album The Infinite Order with adding in vocals for "They Were One" and "Rules of Engagement", while Josh Childers added backing vocals for Ghost Thief with Jeremiah Scott produced both albums.
