= Conceived in Fire =

Studio album by Living Sacrifice
- Released: September 24, 2002
- Recorded: 2002
- Studio: Poynter's Palace, Little Rock, Arkansas
- Genre: Christian metal; metalcore; hardcore punk; nu metal
- Label: Solid State
- Producer: Barry Poynter

Living Sacrifice chronology
| The Hammering Process (2000) | Conceived in Fire (2002) | The Infinite Order (2010) |

Conceived in Fire is the sixth album by the Christian metalcore band Living Sacrifice. It was the band's final album before 2008 when the band reunited, minus Percussionist Matthew Putman.

== Critical reception ==
Professional ratings
Review scores
| Source | Rating |
|---|---|
| AllMusic | 4/5 stars |
| Jesus Freak Hideout | 3.5/5 stars |
| The Metal Crypt | 4.25/5 stars |
| The Whipping Post | 8/10 |

Jason Taylor of AllMusic writes "Living Sacrifice's undeniable talent matched with Barry Poynter's vicious production skill has succeeded yet again, conceiving a record that matches the spectacular The Hammering Process at every turn." Steve Rozema of Jesus Freak Hideout reports "Personally, I think that Conceived in Fire is one of Living Sacrifice's best albums yet. They continue to mature while keeping their old sound that Living Sacrifice fans have grown to love. If you're not a fan of hardcore music such as Figure Four, ZAO, Norma Jean, or Demon Hunter, I suggest steering clear of this album- Living Sacrifice's brutal vocals are prominent throughout it. But if you are, this would be a great addition to your CD collection." Greg Pratt of Exclaim! stated "It's about time this bunch gets the high profile they deserve, be it in the metal-core scene, the Ozzfest, or the thrash world." Peter Johnston wrote "They're honest with this, they're heavy, and the album's a good listen." The Metal Crypt stated "Throw away any inhibitions you might hold in regards to listening to a band dubbed as Christian metal because Conceived In Fire will catch you off guard with its sheer aggressiveness and excellent production" Biff Bartholemew stated "Even though I don't like the "core" sound and style, they really mixed it up good and for that I will praise them."

== Track listing ==
| No. | Title | Length |
|---|---|---|
| 1. | "Imminent War" | 3:10 |
| 2. | "Symbiotic" | 4:16 |
| 3. | "3x3 We Carried Your Body" | 3:10 |
| 4. | "The Poisoning" | 4:20 |
| 5. | "Send Your Regrets" | 3:40 |
| 6. | "Subtle Alliance" | 3:13 |
| 7. | "Into Again" (Additional guitars by Barry Poynter) | 3:14 |
| 8. | "Separation" | 3:02 |
| 9. | "Black Seeds" | 2:53 |
| 10. | "Ignite" | 4:15 |
| 11. | "Distrust" | 3:07 |
| 12. | "The Martyr" | 3:33 |
| 13. | "Reach for the Sky" | 3:06 |

== Personnel ==
Living Sacrifice

- Bruce Fitzhugh - vocals, rhythm guitar
- Rocky Gray - lead guitar
- Arthur Green - bass
- Lance Garvin - drums
- Matthew Putman - drums

Production

- Barry Poynter - producer, guitars on "Into Again"
- David Johnson - photography
- Andy Sneap - mixing, mastering
- Travis Smith - artwork
- Jason Magnusson - assistant producer
