= Everything Starts Where It Ends =

Studio album by Lovedrug
- Released: March 6, 2007
- Genre: Indie rock
- Label: The Militia Group

Lovedrug chronology
| Pretend You're Alive (2004) | Everything Starts Where It Ends (2007) | The Sucker Punch Show (2008) |

Professional ratings
Review scores
| Source | Rating |
|---|---|
| AllMusic | 3.5/5 stars |
| Absolute Punk | (93%) |
| Pop Matters | 8/10 stars |

Everything Starts Where It Ends is the second full length released by indie rock band Lovedrug. It was released in 2007 by The Militia Group. The title song of this album was used in a To Write Love on Her Arms shirt. "Salt of the Earth" was featured in the launch trailer for the 2013 video game The Last of Us.

== Track listing ==
1. "Happy Apple Poison" - 3:39
2. "Pushing the Shine" - 4:19
3. "Castling" - 3:25
4. "Thieving" - 3:17
5. "Bleed Together" - 3:27
6. "Dancing" - 1:15
7. "Ghost by Your Side" - 3:42
8. "Casino Clouds" - 4:40
9. "Doomsday and the Echo" - 5:11
10. "Salt of the Earth" - 6:30
11. "American Swimming Lesson" - 4:17
12. "Everything Starts Where It Ends" - 7:45
