= Lovedrug =

American alternative/indie rock band

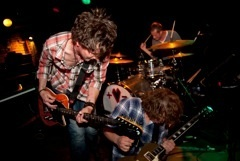

Background information
- Origin: Canton, Ohio, United States
- Genres: indie rock
- Years active: 2001–present
- Labels: The Militia Group
- Members: Michael Shepard; Jessica Shepard; Wesley Chandler; Richard Condon; Brian Ganch
- Past members: Dave Owen; Matt Bentley; Adam Ladd; Matthew Putman; Jeremy M Gifford; Thomas Bragg; James Freshwater

Lovedrug is an American alternative/indie rock band formed in Alliance, Ohio, United States, in 2002 by singer/guitarist Michael Shepard.

== History ==
Lovedrug released their first EP, the Lovedrug EP, with the follow-up EP, the Rocknroll EP, coming in mid-2004. After signing to The Militia Group, an indie-rock label, the band released their first full-length Pretend You're Alive on July 27, 2004. The album was produced by Tim Patalan, and featured dark, guitar-driven art rock. The album became the label's fastest selling debut ever, selling close to 20,000 copies in the first few months of its release. The record and band were thus up-streamed to major label parent Columbia Records at the end of 2005, though the re-release of Pretend You're Alive, and accompanying radio single for "Spiders", were undercut by tremendous corporate purging that plagued Columbia Records throughout 2005 and 2006.

Lovedrug toured heavily from 2004 through early 2007, including support dates with The Killers, Robert Plant, Switchfoot, Coheed And Cambria, Matchbook Romance and several headlining runs, establishing a sizable American following. By late 2006, Lovedrug had a new album's worth of material and, to avoid continued upheaval at Columbia, returned to The Militia Group to release Everything Starts Where It Ends, again produced by Tim Patalan, on March 7, 2007. The album was well received, selling close to 30k albums in several months on the back of Japanese and North American touring, including two headline runs and tours with Sparta, Blue October, and The Plain White Ts. The video for "Ghost By Your Side" was added to regular rotation on MTV and the college/indie single "Happy Apple Poison" charted in the top 10.

The band's third album, The Sucker Punch Show, was made with iconic 90s rock producer Michael Beinhorn (Soundgarden, Red Hot Chili Peppers, Mew) at the Red Bull Studios in Santa Monica, CA. Though the October 28, 2008 release coincided with the bankruptcy and collapse of The Militia Group in North America, the album was especially well received when re-released in Europe on June 2, 2009 with Make My Day Records, landing at No. 6 on the Visions summer chart, garnering broad radio play for the single "Only One". The European version of The Sucker Punch Show included a full-length alternate version of the album entitled Sucker Punched (Alt. LP). The band toured Europe in June and July, playing a number of club shows and festivals with Kings of Leon, Nine Inch Nails, Silversun Pickups, and Eagles of Death Metal.

March 2010 saw EP - Part I, the first installment in a series of three EPs collectively logoed +/-, coinciding with the band's appearances at the South By Southwest conference in Austin Texas and a number of surrounding touring dates including Bamboozle at Giants Stadium. EP - Part II followed on June 13, 2010, along with another three-week headlining tour in the U.S. In November the band announced I AM LOVEDRUG, a fan-driven campaign in partnership with PledgeMusic to fund the recording and setup of their fourth album. The band reached its goal over the holiday, released the final EP - Part III in January 2011, and headed into the studio in March and April with producer Paul Moak in Nashville to complete Wild Blood. Shortly thereafter, the band went on hiatus.

In 2014, Michael Shepard began recording Lovedrug's fifth studio album, Notions, which was released on September 4, 2015. The single "Cult Kid" received airplay on Nashville's Lightning 100 as part of "Music City Mayhem". The band toured heavily to promote the album. A deluxe edition was released on April 15, 2016.

On January 13, 2017, Lovedrug released (ii), a re-imagining of their first album Pretend You're Alive. That same year the single "All In" was released, and was synced on Season 5, Episode 9 (the summer finale, titled "Prom") of ABC's TV series The Fosters.

On December 22, 2017, Lovedrug released Relive, the band's seventh studio album.

On October 26, 2018, Michael Shepard announced the end of the Lovedrug project, and a final album, (iii), a re-imagining of their second album, Everything Starts Where It Ends.

On May 1, 2020, Lovedrug released Turning into Something You Were Never Meant to Be, the band's ninth studio album.

== Members ==
Current members

- Michael Shepard – vocals, guitar
- Jessica Shepard – keyboards, piano, background vocals
- Wesley Chandler – guitar
- Richard Condon – bass
- Brian Ganch – drums

== Discography ==
=== Albums ===
- Pretend You're Alive (2004) The Militia Group / Columbia Records
- Everything Starts Where It Ends (2007) The Militia Group / Lovedrugmusic
- The Sucker Punch Show (2008/2009) The Militia Group / Make My Day Records
- Wild Blood (March 6, 2012) Lovedrugmusic
- Pretend You're Alive - rarities version 10-year edition (July 27, 2014) Lovedrugmusic
- Notions (September 4, 2015) Lovedrugmusic
- (ii) (January 13, 2017) Lovedrugmusic
- Relive (December 22, 2017) Lovedrugmusic
- (iii) (October 26, 2018) Lovedrugmusic
- Turning into Something You Were Never Meant To Be (May 1, 2020) Lovedrugmusic

=== EPs ===
- Lovedrug EP (2002)
- Rocknroll EP (2004)
- Everything Starts... EP (October 24, 2006)
- This is The End EP (2008 - digital bonus tracks with album pre-order))
- Sucker Punched (Alt. LP) (2009)
- Everything Starts Live Tour - bootleg (2010)
- EP - Part I (2010)
- EP - Part II (2010)
- EP - Part III (January 2011)
- "Pink Champagne" / "Dinosaur" - single (September 6, 2011)
- Sessions EP (September 6, 2012)
