= Matthew Putman (drummer) =

American drummer

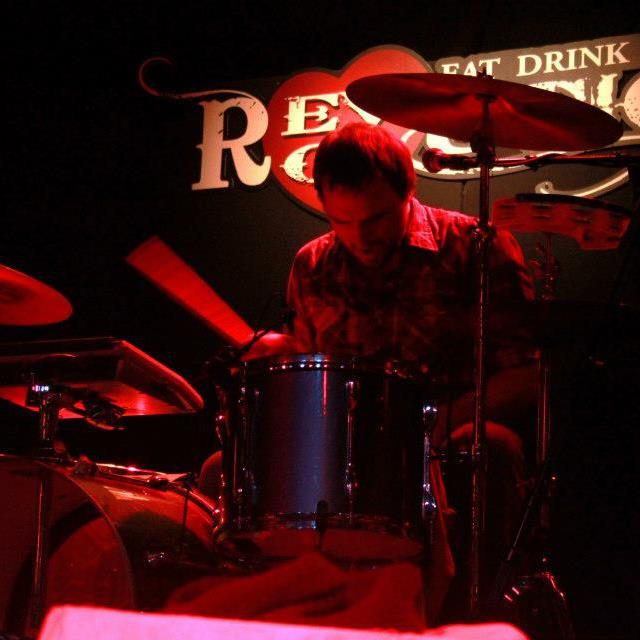
- Putman with Bear Colony in 2012

Background information
- Born: Matthew Lee Putman
- Genres: Mathcore; Christian metal; heavy metal; indie rock; alternative rock
- Occupation: Drummer
- Years active: 1996–present

Matthew Putman is an American drummer. He is best known for his work with the rock/metal bands Norma Jean, Unwed Sailor, Living Sacrifice, and Lovedrug.

== Career ==
Putman began his career in 1996 when he formed the mathcore band Eso-Charis in Fort Smith, Arkansas with his brother Cory Brandan Putman, who later went on to join Norma Jean. When Eso-Charis disbanded in 1998, Putman joined the heavy metal band Living Sacrifice from 1998 to 2003, playing percussion on their albums The Hammering Process and Conceived in Fire.

In 2002, Putman joined the indie rock band Unwed Sailor. He appeared on the albums The Marionette and the Music Box, White Ox, and Little Wars. During this time, he also joined the Ohio alternative rock band Lovedrug from 2003 to 2005, appearing on the albums Pretend You're Alive, Everything Starts Where It Ends, and the Everything Starts... EP.

Putman has appeared as a sideman on several albums by bands such as Norma Jean, Chase Pagan, and The Last Royals.

== Bands ==
Band	Year Active
Eso-Charis	1996–2002
Living Sacrifice	1999–2003
Unwed Sailor	2002–present
Lovedrug	2003–2005
Bear Colony	2005–present
Chase Pagan	2005–present
Norma Jean	2006–present
Family History	2008–present
Fear is the Driving Force	2008–present
OrphanTwin	2022–present

== Discography ==
Band	Album	Year
Eso-Charis	The Plateau Green	1996
Eso-Charis	S/T	1998
Eso-Charis	Setting Roots for Winter	2000
Living Sacrifice	The Hammering Process	2000
Living Sacrifice	Conceived in Fire	2002
Snailhuntr	Origin of the Spiral	2002
Unwed Sailor	The Marionette and the Music Box	2003
Lovedrug	Pretend You're Alive	2004
Unwed Sailor	The White Ox	2006
Norma Jean	Redeemer	2006
Lovedrug	Everything Starts Where It Ends	2007
Lovedrug	Everything Starts... EP	2007
Bear Colony	We Came Here To Die	2007
Chase Pagan	Oh, Musica	2007
Unwed Sailor	Little Wars	2008
David Thomas Owen	Solace, My King	2009
Fear Is The Driving Force	Volume Zero	2009
Chase Pagan	Bells & Whistles	2009
Bear Colony	Soft Eyes	2012
The Last Royals	The Last Royals EP	2013
The Last Royals	Twistification	2013
Family History	Live at Insomniac Studios	2013
Glass Wands	Self Titled	2014
Paper Anthem	By Ghosts	2015
Snailhuntr	Every Dream Has a Snake	2015
Randall Shreve	The Devil & The End	2015
Unwed Sailor	Heavy Age	2019
Norma Jean	All Hail	2019
Unwed Sailor	Look Alive	2020
OrphanTwin	Future Classic	2022
