= Living Sacrifice =

American Christian metal band

- Origin: Little Rock, Arkansas, U.S.
- Genres: Christian metal, metalcore, groove metal, thrash metal, death metal
- Years active: 1989–2005, 2008–present
- Labels: R.E.X., Solid State
- Members: Bruce Fitzhugh; Rocky Gray; Lance Garvin; Arthur Green
- Past members: Darren Johnson; Jason Truby; Chris Truby; Cory Putman; Matthew Putman; Jay Stacey
- Website: Living Sacrifice on Facebook

Living Sacrifice is an American Christian metal band formed in Little Rock, Arkansas, in 1989. The band has released eight studio albums, of which the first three were recorded under R.E.X. Records with original vocalist Darren Johnson, starting off as thrash metal, followed by death metal. The band evolved into a groove metal and metalcore style with Reborn (1997), under Solid State Records and with original guitarist Bruce Fitzhugh singing. In 2003, the group disbanded due to other projects. Solid State released their best-of album, In Memoriam (2005). In 2008, Living Sacrifice reformed and released the two-song digital single Death Machine. They began working on The Infinite Order, released on January 26, 2010. Lance Garvin and Bruce Fitzhugh are the two remaining original members.

== History ==
Living Sacrifice was one of the first Christian death metal bands, along with Sacrament and Mortification. The band, whose name derives from Romans 12:1, formed in 1989 by Darren "D.J." Johnson (bass, vocals), Bruce Fitzhugh (guitar), and Lance Garvin (drums). Guitarist Jason Truby joined later on. The band performed their debut show on December 1, 1989, for a hall of nurses. They released a three-song demo in 1990, Not Yielding to Ungodly, which led to Kurt Bachman and Joey Daub from Believer to sign them to R.E.X. Records.

In 1991, Living Sacrifice's self-titled debut album was released on R.E.X. Records. The album was recorded at Catamount Recording Studio in Iowa with Bachman as a producer. The album was compared to thrash metal groups of the time, especially Slayer. On November 17, 1992, Living Sacrifice released their second album, Nonexistent. On this album, Living Sacrifice switched from thrash to down-tuned death metal, and Johnson experimented with a death growl. The members have said that they were disappointed with this album and blamed the producer. The producer had no prior experience on metal albums and did not know how to work with the band. The band had reached out to Scott Burns of Morrisound Recording (Death, Atheist, Obituary), but the label stated the band had to release the album before Cornerstone Festival of 1992, which did not work with Burns' schedule. Since the engineer was unaware of the proper techniques, Johnson and Garvin worked on the engineering side themselves.

In 1994, the band released a third album, Inhabit, considered by some the heaviest Living Sacrifice album. On Inhabit, Johnson returned to thrash-oriented vocals, deeper and lower than his singing on the band's debut. To support the album, the toured with Malevolent Creation. After this recording, R.E.X. went bankrupt, and Living Sacrifice signed to Solid State Records to widen their audience.

After this, Johnson left the band to follow non-musical ministry, and Fitzhugh took over vocals. Truby's brother, Chris, joined on bass. This lineup recorded Reborn, their Solid State debut, in 1997. The band played a mix of groove metal and metalcore. Reborn is considered the most influential Living Sacrifice record, and earned them a larger non-Christian fanbase. After this record, the Trubys left the band and Jay Stacy filled in on bass while Cory Brandan Putman played guitar. The band embarked on a few tours with the line of Fitzhugh, Garvin, Stacy, and Putman, including a tour with Cannibal Corpse and Angelcorpse. In 1999, Stacy left the band to focus on his family and was replaced with Arthur Green, formerly of Eso-Charis. Putman played guitar for a tour through Norway and Sweden but was replaced with Rocky Gray, who would go on to play drums in Evanescence and We Are the Fallen and guitar in Soul Embraced. At the end of 1999, percussionist Matthew Putman joined Living Sacrifice.

In 2000, Living Sacrifice recorded their fifth full-length album, The Hammering Process, with a more rhythmical sound oriented towards groove metal. Fitzhugh sang in the Evanescence song "Lies". In 2001, A Tribute to Living Sacrifice was released. The album contains covers of many Living Sacrifice songs by other metal bands and former members, and a Living Sacrifice song from a split EP, Metamorphosis, released in 1993. In 2002, Living Sacrifice recorded the album Conceived in Fire. In June 2003, Living Sacrifice canceled the rest of one of their tours and announced they were disbanding.

Each band member had other commitments, such as Lance Garvin and Rocky Gray's Soul Embraced, and felt it was time to move on. According to several interviews, it was supposed to be Bruce Fitzhugh's final tour, and after he left, Cory Brandan Putman was supposed to take over lead vocals and rhythm guitar, and Bryan Gray, formerly of The Blamed, was to take over lead guitar.

In March 2005, In Memoriam was released by Solid State Records. It is a "best of" album, containing three "newly written and recorded songs by Lance Garvin, Rocky Gray and Bruce Fitzhugh", two songs from each Living Sacrifice album, plus "Enthroned", a 1998 cover of a song originally released on 1992's Nonexistent. The three new songs are "In Christ", "Killers", and "The Power of God". In 2007, Bruce Fitzhugh was featured on the song "Sixteen", on Demon Hunter's fourth album Storm the Gates of Hell.

On February 4, 2008, a newly created official MySpace page was updated to announce the reformation of the band. They also announced their support of Demon Hunter in the "Stronger Than Hell" tour from May 26 through July 5, 2008. On June 10, 2008, Living Sacrifice released a two-song, online-only sampler, Death Machine. On the same day at the Dallas, Texas date of the "Stronger Than Hell" tour, vocalist and rhythm guitarist Bruce Fitzhugh announced that the band was working on a new CD which they hoped to release in 2009. The album release was delayed by Solid State and eventually came out on January 26, 2010. A music video for their lead single off The Infinite Order, "Rules of Engagement", was aired December 22.

The band's seventh studio album, The Infinite Order, was released January 26, 2010, via Solid State Records. The album features the voices of David Bunton from The Showdown, Joe Musten from Advent and Beloved, and guitarist Jason Truby. The album was mixed and mastered by Andy Sneap, Hell guitarist. Track three references the phrase "God is dead" by Friedrich Nietzsche. Released in November, the deluxe edition contained three additional tracks, two live songs and a new track.

In 2013, after three years of touring, Living Sacrifice recorded their eighth album, Ghost Thief, released November 12, 2013, on Solid State Records. The first song named "The Reaping" was premiered on October 17, 2013, on the Solid State YouTube page. The album features the guest voices of Ryan Clark from Demon Hunter on "Screwtape", and Dave Peters from Throwdown on "Despair". The title song, "Ghost Thief", premiered November 6, 2013, on Revolver magazine website. Living Sacrifice is featured on the Killing Floor 2 Soundtrack. The band performed their first shows of 2017 on the ShipRocked cruise alongside bands such as Pop Evil, Breaking Benjamin, Papa Roach, Sevendust and Lacey Sturm.

According to former vocalist DJ Johnson, a friend of the band's is developing a documentary of the band. In 2017, the band released "New Day" on a benefit compilation, We Bear the Scars. The track was originally supposed to be a part of The Hammering Process, but the band and producer Barry Poynter lost the track during the mixing process. The band's documentary, 30 Years of Sacrifice, was to debut at the band's 30th anniversary show on March 28, 2020, and feature The Blamed, and former members Darren Johnson, Jason and Chris Truby, as well as Embodyment and The Famine drummer Mark Garza on percussion. Due to COVID-19, however, the premiere of the documentary was postponed.

In 2021, Nordic Mission released a remaster of Living Sacrifice's self-titled debut album for its 30th anniversary. In 2022, Nordic Mission released a remaster of their second album Nonexistent on Vinyl and CD.

== Musical style and legacy ==
The band's style has been described as Christian metal, death metal, thrash metal, groove metal, and metalcore. Bands that have named Living Sacrifice an influence include: As I Lay Dying, Throwdown, Demon Hunter, Underøath, Haste the Day, Saving Grace, 7 Horns 7 Eyes and many more.

== Band members ==
Current members
Name	Instrument	Years	Other groups
Bruce Fitzhugh	lead vocals, rhythm guitar	1989–2003, 2005, 2008–present	
Rocky Gray	lead guitar, backing vocals	1998–2003, 2005, 2008–present	Evanescence, Soul Embraced, We Are the Fallen, Solus Deus, Machina, Shredded Corpse, Kill System
Arthur Green	bass, backing vocals	1999–2003, 2008–present	Eso-Charis, Elliot
Lance Garvin	drums, auxiliary percussion	1989–2003, 2005, 2008–present	Soul Embraced, Zao, Throwdown, Kill System

Past members
Name	Instrument	Years	Other groups
Matt Putman	auxiliary percussion, backing vocals	1998 (live) 1999–2003	Eso-Charis, Elliot, Lovedrug, Unwed Sailor, Fear is the Driving Force, Bear Colony, Snailhuntr, Ester Drang, The Last Royals
Darren "DJ" Johnson	lead vocals, bass	1989–1995, 2014 (Live), 2018 (Live), 2020–present (Live)	
Jason Truby	lead guitar, backing vocals	1989–1998, 2020 (Live)	P.O.D., Archangel
Chris Truby	bass	1995–1998, 2020 (Live)	Archangel
Cory Brandan Putman	lead guitar, backing vocals	1998, 2003	Eso-Charis, Elliot, Norma Jean, Uses Fire, The Handshake Murders, Fear is the Driving Force, The Radio Sky
Jay Stacey	bass	1998–1999	

Live musicians
Name	Instrument	Years	Other groups
Chad Wilburn	auxiliary percussion	1998	Mindrage, Society's Finest
Jim Chaffin	drums	2011	The Crucified, The Blamed, Deliverance
Josh Childers	lead guitar	2010	The Showdown
Brian Shorter	lead guitar	2017	Destroy Destroy Destroy
Bryan Gray	rhythm guitars	2003	The Blamed, Left Out, Mortal, Blenderhead, Six Feet Deep, Rocks in Pink Cement, The Satire, Klank, Mend
Mark Garza	auxiliary percussion	2020	The Famine, Embodyment

Timeline

== Discography ==
Living Sacrifice discography
- Studio albums: 8
- Extended plays: 3
- Compilation albums: 1
- Music videos: 4

Studio albums

Year	Title	Label
1991	Living Sacrifice	R.E.X.
1992	Nonexistent	R.E.X.
1994	Inhabit	R.E.X.
1997	Reborn	Solid State
2000	The Hammering Process	Solid State
2002	Conceived in Fire	Solid State
2010	The Infinite Order	Solid State
2013	Ghost Thief	Solid State

EPs

- Metamorphosis (split EP with Circle of Dust, 1993)
- Subtle Alliance (2002, Solid State Records)
- Death Machine (2008, independent)

Demos

- Not Yielding to Ungodly (1990)
- Bloodwork & Burn the End (2000)

Compilation

- In Memoriam (best-of compilation, 2005)

DVDs

- In Finite Live (2011)
- 30 Years of Sacrifice: The Story of Living Sacrifice (2021)

Other songs

- "Overkill Exposure" (rough mix) (a single track only given out through the 2009 Fuel magazine sampler)
- "Something More" (a single re-recorded track from Reborn put on the Killing Floor 2 Soundtrack)
- "New Day" (a song that was originally supposed to be a part of The Hammering Process but was lost during mixing. It was released finally on We Bear the Scars, a benefit compilation for Timothy Henderson of Warlord)

Music videos

- "...To Nothing" (1992)
- "Reject" (1997)
- "Rules of Engagement" (2009)
- "Overkill Exposure" (2010)

== See also ==
- List of songs recorded by Living Sacrifice
