= Ghost Thief =

Studio album by Living Sacrifice
- Released: November 11, 2013
- Recorded: November 2012
- Genre: Christian metal; thrash metal; metalcore
- Length: 45:15
- Label: Solid State
- Producer: Jeremiah Scott

Living Sacrifice chronology
The Infinite Order (2010)	Ghost Thief (2013)

Ghost Thief is the eighth studio album by the Christian metal band Living Sacrifice. It is their second album produced by Jeremiah Scott.

== Writing and recording ==
The band toured in support of their prior album, The Infinite Order, for three years before starting up work on recording a followup. The band chose to once again work with music producer Jeremiah Scott, with whom the band had collaborated on their previous album. The band started with writing the music, and then wrote lyrics once the music was already established.

== Themes and composition ==
The album's title, Ghost Thief, is meant as "the personification of death". Conceptually, the album's lyrics explore the fleeting nature of life, the idea of an afterlife, and how death can be viewed as either "friend or foe" by different people in different circumstances. The tracks "Ghost Thief" and "Sudden" specifically were both inspired by family members of Lance Garvin and Rocky Gray, who died unexpectedly.

The album consists of songs that are mid- to fast-tempo thrash metal and groove metal, but also features more melodic guitar-work than prior albums as well. Many tracks on the album do not use standard verse-chorus song structures.

== Reception ==
Professional ratings
Review scores
Source	Rating
CCM Magazine	3/5 stars
HM Magazine	3/5 stars
Indie Vision Music	5/5 stars
Jesus Freak Hideout	4/5 stars 4.5/5 stars

Specifying in a three star review by CCM Magazine, Matt Conner recognizes, "With blistering songs like 'Sudden' and the title track, it's clear these guys aren't hanging it up any time soon." David Stagg, indicating in a three star review from HM Magazine, realizes, "The album succeeds on most fronts, but if we’re judging on all the merits in between, the bulk of the tracks blend in." Signaling in a four star review for Jesus Freak Hideout, Timothy Estabrooks responds, "it is an excellent album filled with many masterfully-performed tracks and only a couple of disappointments." Lee Brown, mentioning for Indie Vision Music in a five star review, reports, "Ghost Thief is simply a powerhouse album that fans who have been waiting three long years to get their hands on will not mind coming back to in the coming year/s until the next great Living Sacrifice masterpiece is released." The second opinion by Aaron Lambert from Jesus Freak Hideout, where he rated the album four and a half stars, depicts, "Ghost Thief becomes yet another Christian metal classic from the godfathers of the genre itself."

== Track listing ==
No.	Title	Length
1.	"Screwtape" (featuring Ryan Clark of Demon Hunter)	5:35
2.	"Ghost Thief"	4:41
3.	"The Reaping"	3:26
4.	"Straw Man"	3:46
5.	"Sudden"	4:46
6.	"Mask"	4:49
7.	"American Made"	5:26
8.	"Before"	4:31
9.	"Your War"	3:56
10.	"Despair" (featuring Dave Peters of Throwdown)	4:19
Total length:		45:15

== Personnel ==
Living Sacrifice

- Bruce Fitzhugh - lead vocals, rhythm guitar
- Rocky Gray - lead guitar
- Arthur Green - bass, vocals
- Lance Garvin - drums, percussion

Guest musicians

- Ryan Clark - vocals on track 1
- Dave Peters - vocals on track 10
- Nick Hipa - lead guitar on track 3
- Jeremiah Scott - acoustic intro on track 1
- T.D. Benton - additional percussion on track 2
- Josh Childers, Dustinn Lowery, Brad Hartley, Chris Bazor, Adam Phillips, and Loren Tew - Viking gang vocals

Production

- Recorded by Jeremiah Scott, at Jeremiah Scott Production
- Produced by Jeremiah Scott, Living Sacrifice
- Mixed by Steve Blackmon

Art

- Cover art by Travis Smith
- Additional design by Ryan Clark of Invisible Creature
- Photos by Jeremiah Scott

== Charts ==
Chart (2013)	Peak position
U.S. Billboard Christian Albums	23
U.S. Billboard Hard Rock Albums	20
U.S. Billboard Top Heatseekers	9
