= Pretend You're Alive =

Studio album by Lovedrug
- Released: July 27, 2004
- Genre: Indie rock
- Label: The Militia Group

Lovedrug chronology
Pretend You're Alive (2004)	Everything Starts Where It Ends (2007)

Professional ratings
Review scores
Source	Rating
AllMusic	3/5 stars
Stylus Magazine	favorable
Sputnik Music	4.5/5 stars

Pretend You're Alive is the first full-length album by indie rock band Lovedrug. It was released in 2004 on The Militia Group. Lyrics by Michael Shepard. Music by Michael Shepard, Adam Ladd and Matt Bentley.

== Track listing ==
1. "In Red" - 4:10
2. "Blackout" - 5:41
3. "Spiders" - 3:10
4. "Rocknroll" - 3:22
5. "Pretend You're Alive" - 5:11
6. "Pandamoranda" - 2:46
7. "Down Towards the Healing" - 5:28
8. "The Monster" - 5:06
9. "Angels with Enemies" - 4:12
10. "Radiology" - 4:29
11. "Candy" - 4:38
12. "It Won't Last" - 7:04
13. "Paper Scars" - 1:47
