= Inhabit (album) =

Album by Living Sacrifice

Studio album by Living Sacrifice
- Released: May 24, 1994
- Recorded: December 27, 1993 – January 4, 1994
- Studio: Trauma Studios, Colebrook, Pennsylvania
- Genre: Christian metal, hardcore punk, death metal
- Length: 44:17
- Label: R.E.X.
- Producer: Joey Daub; Kurt Bachman

Living Sacrifice chronology
Nonexistent (1992)	Inhabit (1994)	Reborn (1997)

Solid State rerelease cover

Professional ratings
Review scores
Source	Rating
AllMusic	4/5 stars
Jesus Freak Hideout	3.5/5 stars

Inhabit is the third album by the Christian metal band Living Sacrifice and the final album with bassist/vocalist Darren "D.J." Johnson. The album was recorded at Believer's Trauma Studios. Kurt Bachman and Joey Daub of Believer also produced and engineered this album. It was the final album the band would release while under REX. The album would later be reissued with new artwork on the band's new label, Solid State Records.

The album was recorded on Alesis digital tape.

== Track listing ==
All tracks are written by Living Sacrifice.

No.	Title	Length
1.	"In the Shadow"	2:58
2.	"Not Beneath"	6:32
3.	"Sorrow Banished"	2:57
4.	"Unseen"	3:42
5.	"Inhabit"	3:46
6.	"Breathing Murder"	4:26
7.	"Mind Distant"	5:41
8.	"Darkened"	3:54
9.	"Indwelling"	3:13
10.	"Departure"	7:08
Total length:		44:17

== Credits ==
Living Sacrifice

- Darren "D.J." Johnson – vocals, bass
- Lance Garvin – drums
- Jason Truby – lead guitar
- Bruce Fitzhugh – rhythm guitar

Additional

- Joey Daub – production, engineer, mixing
- Kurt Bachman – production, engineer, mixing
- Wreland Sthim – photography
- Caleb Mitchell – photography
- P. Gavin Morkel – executive producer
- Tyler Bacon – executive producer
