= The Infinite Order =

Studio album by Living Sacrifice
- Released: January 26, 2010
- Genre: Groove metal, Christian metal, metalcore
- Length: 46:57
- Label: Solid State
- Producer: Jeremiah Scott

Living Sacrifice chronology
Conceived in Fire (2002)	The Infinite Order (2010)	Ghost Thief (2013)

Singles from The Infinite Order
- 1. "Rules of Engagement" Released: December 8, 2009

Professional ratings
Review scores
Source	Rating
Christianity Today	4/5 stars
Exclaim!	mixed
Indie Vision Music	5/5 stars
Jesus Freak Hideout	5/5 stars
Metal Storm	9/10 stars
PopMatters	8/10 stars

The Infinite Order is the seventh studio album from Christian metal band Living Sacrifice released January 26, 2010. The album, produced by Jeremiah Scott and mixed and mastering done by Andy Sneap marks a return for the band since their prior album in 2002. Because the manufacturer used the wrong master, the first pressing has an additional song "Of My Flesh, Of My Heart" on track 12 that was intended to be a bonus track on a possible European release. Future pressings will have the intended 11 tracks. They have since made a deluxe edition of the album available only through iTunes. The deluxe edition features new artwork, one bonus studio track, two live bonus tracks, and the In Finite Live DVD. Music videos were made for the songs "Rules of Engagement" and "Overkill Exposure". "Love Forgives" is inspired by the book of 1 Corinthians 13.

== Track listing ==
All lyrics written by Living Sacrifice and composed by Living Sacrifice

No.	Title	Length
1.	"Overkill Exposure"	2:48
2.	"Rules of Engagement" (featuring David Bunton of The Showdown)	3:27
3.	"Nietzsche's Madness" (featuring Joe Musten of Advent, The Almost, and Beloved)	3:32
4.	"Unfit to Live"	4:27
5.	"The Training"	4:17
6.	"Organized Lie" (featuring Drew Garrison of Little Rock Police Department, Ecomium, and Descended From Wolves)	3:23
7.	"The Reckoning"	3:41
8.	"Love Forgives"	3:24
9.	"They Were One" (featuring David Bunton of The Showdown)	3:20
10.	"God Is My Home"	4:52
11.	"Apostasy"	6:46
12.	"Of My Flesh, Of My Heart" (Manufacturer mistake: first pressing of CD only)	2:56
Total length:		46:57

Deluxe edition bonus tracks
No.	Title	Length
12.	"Glasshouses"	2:47
13.	"Flatline (live)"	3:45
14.	"Symbiotic (live)"	4:58
Total length:		11:30

== Personnel ==
Living Sacrifice

- Bruce Fitzhugh - lead vocals, rhythm guitar
- Rocky Gray - lead guitar
- Arthur Green - bass, backing vocals
- Lance Garvin - drums, percussion

Guest musicians

- David Bunton - vocals on tracks 2 and 9
- Joe Musten - vocals on track 3, additional percussion on track 3
- Drew Garrison - vocals on track 6
- Jason Truby - guitar on track 5
- Mike Ferrara - acoustic guitar on track 11
- Chris Dauphin - orchestration on track 11
- Zach Bohannon - additional percussion on track 10

Production

- Recorded by Barry Poynter at Poynter Recording
- Produced by Jeremiah Scott, Living Sacrifice
- Mixed and Mastering by Andy Sneap
- A&R by Jon Dunn

Art

- Illustrations by Dave Quiggle
- Layout by Ryan Clark
- Photos by Keaton Andrew
