= Lance Garvin =

American drummer

- Origin: Little Rock, Arkansas, U.S.
- Genres: Christian metal, heavy metal, metalcore, death metal, groove metal, thrash metal
- Instrument: Drummer
- Years active: 1989–present
- Member of: Living Sacrifice; Soul Embraced; Hope Deferred
- Formerly of: Kill System

Lance Garvin is an American drummer and, along with Bruce Fitzhugh, DJ Johnson and Jason Truby, a founding member of the Christian metal band Living Sacrifice. Garvin is mostly known for using a Ride Cymbal in modern metal without making it sound thinner.

Garvin is also the drummer of Christian metal band Soul Embraced and has played with the bands Throwdown and Zao as well. He formed the band Kill System, along with fellow Soul Embraced members, Chad Moore and Rocky Gray, and former Evanescence guitarist John LeCompt.

When Living Sacrifice prepared to release their documentary, the release was delayed by COVID-19, with Garvin contracting the sickness. Following his recovery, the plan to work on new material was also delayed by Garvin breaking his leg.

== Influence and legacy ==
Garvin has stated that his inspiration was Ace Frehley of Kiss:

"I actually wanted to be Ace Frehley of Kiss when I was five years old. Their 1976 Destroyer album is what turned me into a metal head."

With Living Sacrifice, Garvin influenced many metal bands, such as As I Lay Dying, Throwdown, 7 Horns 7 Eyes, Saving Grace, Demon Hunter and Underoath.

Garvin, along with Brandan Trahan of Impending Doom and xDEATHSTARx, Matt Greiner of August Burns Red and Ted Kirkpatrick of Tourniquet, are all considered influential drummers for Christian metal.

Garvin has been compared by his bandmate Bruce Fitzhugh and others to Slayer's former drummer, Dave Lombardo.

== Bands ==
Current

- Hope Deferred - drums (2021–present)
- Living Sacrifice – drums (1989–2003, 2005, 2008–present)
- Soul Embraced – drums (1999–2009, 2014–present)

Former

- Kill System – drums (2002–2003)
- Heroes Among Thieves – guitars, drums (2007–2008)
- The Satire – drums

Touring

- The Blamed – drums (1996, 1999)
- Zao – drums (2003)
- Throwdown – drums (2009–2011)
- Ironside – drums (2019–present)

== Discography ==
With Living Sacrifice

- Not Yielding to Ungodly (1989)
- Living Sacrifice (1991)
- Nonexistent (1992)
- Metamorphosis (1993)
- Inhabit (1994)
- Reborn (1997)
- The Hammering Process (2000)
- Subtle Alliance (2002)
- Conceived in Fire (2002)
- In Memoriam (2005)
- Death Machine (2008)
- The Infinite Order (2010)
- Ghost Thief (2013)

With Soul Embraced

- The Fleshless (1999)
- For the Incomplete (2000)
- This Is My Blood (2002)
- Immune (2003)
- Dead Alive (2008)

With Kill System

- Kill System (2002)

As additional musician

- Forever by The Blamed (1999)
- Burning Bridges by Haste the Day (2004)
- In the Clutches of the Novae by Mothwind (2014)
