= Meridional (album) =

Studio album by Norma Jean
- Released: July 13, 2010
- Recorded: February 2010
- Studio: Glow in the Dark Studios, Atlanta, GA
- Genre: Metalcore; mathcore; sludge metal; post-hardcore
- Length: 67:24
- Label: Razor & Tie
- Producer: Jeremy SH Griffith

Norma Jean chronology
The Anti Mother (2008)	Meridional (2010)	Wrongdoers (2013)

Singles from Meridional
- 1. "Leaderless and Self Enlisted" Released: May 6, 2010; 2. "Kill More Presidents" Released: July 10, 2010

Meridional is the fifth studio album by American metalcore band Norma Jean. The album was released on July 13, 2010, and is also the band's first release through Razor & Tie since leaving Solid State Records in 2009. After recording their two previous studio albums, The Anti Mother and Redeemer, with producer Ross Robinson, Norma Jean selected Jeremy SH Griffith to produce Meridional in order to expand their sound. It is the last album to feature guitarist Scottie Henry, bassist Jake Schultz and drummer Chris Raines. The first single off the album, "Leaderless and Self Enlisted," was released on May 6, 2010.

== Musical style ==
Meridional has been described as a metalcore, mathcore, sludge metal, and post-hardcore album.

== Writing and recording ==
Norma Jean began writing music for Meridional in January 2009 in Atlanta, Georgia. In April 2009, the band dropped off a tour with Silverstein, Blessthefall and Before Their Eyes due to a number of undisclosed reasons. They announced that, upon returning to Atlanta, they would resume writing their fifth full-length. The music Norma Jean was writing was described as "something totally new" and something that would pay tribute to "how this band began by digging deep into our roots musically." The band later clarified that "roots" didn't necessarily mean that they would write a new album similar to their first record, Bless the Martyr and Kiss the Child. Instead, they were referring to their former mentality when the band members first started making music. The writing process continued throughout the remainder of 2009 and was officially completed in January 2010.

Norma Jean entered Glow in the Dark studios in Atlanta with record producer Jeremy Griffith (Saosin, Forever Changed, Cool Hand Luke) and Pro Tools audio engineer Justin Chapman to record Meridional February 1, 2010. They spent the first three days in pre-production creating live recordings of all the songs for the record. Griffith suggested that the band track guitars before bass guitars, which is backwards from conventional recording methods. Vocalist Cory Brandan stated that this switch was, "a great idea because we changed the chords and progressions on a lot of songs throughout recording, so we were able to have the bass follow the guitars and be a part of the rhythm section more accurately." Norma Jean welcomed Griffith's input on the album. During recording, he would occasionally record his own vocal tracks for songs to see how the band liked his ideas. Griffith contributed backing vocals to a number of songs, and also played piano. The group used a wide array of instruments in addition to the piano from Glow in the Dark studios, including acoustic guitars, organs, random percussion, and a lap steel guitar. Norma Jean also used a variety of guitar tunings from "our regular drop C#, to C and occasionally to super low B." Recording and production was finished before the end of February. Meridional resulted in the largest number of tracks Norma Jean had recorded in one session to date, with 13 songs and three short interludes.

== Album title ==
Meridional is the term used historically in astronomy, generally by countries whose language is rooted in Latin, to describe a southern direction on the celestial globe. The title, when it was originally thought up by the band, was intended to be a tongue-in-cheek reference to Norma Jean's southern roots. The group is based in the southern regions of the United States, specifically in Douglasville, Georgia. However, according to Cory Brandon, the title later fit together with the story and theme of Meridional, and also ties in with the artwork. The other three celestial directions: Septentrional (northern), Oriental (eastern) and Occidental (western) make up the album's three interlude tracks.

== Release and promotion ==
=== Pre-release ===
"If we didn't sign to Razor & Tie, I think we would have gone on a killing spree, with no regard for life or limb. I think for the first time in our career, upon presenting our ideas, we get to hear the word 'yes' more often."

—Cory Brandan

Meridional was the first release from the band through Razor & Tie since they left Solid State Records after seven years and four studio albums. Norma Jean also spent additional years with Solid State, and released one album entitled Throwing Myself in 2001 through the label, under their original name Luti-Kriss. Some music news sites found the label choice odd as Razor & Tie is also home to the blue-eyed soul singer Michael McDonald, The Irish Tenors from PBS and the children's cover album series Kidz Bop.

Norma Jean toured with The Chariot, Horse the Band and Arsonists Get All the Girls during the "Explosions 2009" tour in November and December of that year. On select dates of the tour, the band performed their debut album Bless the Martyr and Kiss the Child in its entirety and also debuted the new song "Kill More Presidents". Fans were encouraged to bring video cameras to the concerts and submit their recordings of "Kill More Presidents" to the band online. Video clips from various recordings were compiled into one video with a demo recording of the new song used as the audio. Fans could download the video for free by subscribing to the band's e-mailing list. The song "Kill More Presidents" did not make the final cut for the album. It was the first track that Norma Jean had demoed for Meridional, and the band had grown tired of it. A newer version of the song with an entirely new ending had been recorded with the intent to release it at a later time.

In April 2010, Cory Brandon created and released a promotional video for Meridional. The video features glimpses of the album's cover art with a clip of the song "The Anthem of the Angry Brides" as the audio. The artwork was created by Jason Oda (Congregation of the Damned, Hide Nothing) of StarvingEyes, an artist of which Brandon has been a fan of "for years." Commenting on the artwork, Brandon stated, "We take a lot of pride in all the art we use. Every record has a certain vibe, and we always want the artwork to represent that same energy. This record has a very specific, very dark feel throughout and I know that of any record we've ever released, this is definitely the best artwork we've ever had." The full album cover was later released in May 2010.

The "Leaderless and Self Enlisted" digital single cover art.

On May 6, 2010, Norma Jean released the song "Leaderless and Self Enlisted" for free to anyone that signed up for their online mailing list. It was later sold through digital media sources such as iTunes or Amazon.com, and became the band's first single released separately from one of their albums. Musically, the song was considered similar to Norma Jean's 2008 album The Anti Mother, despite previously claiming that Meridional would be a return to the group's roots.

Meridional was made available for pre-order in June 2010 with a few different packages available containing various assortments of band merchandise. The album is available on both CD and double disc 12" vinyl formats. All pre-order packages included a free and instant download of the song "Deathbed Atheist" off of the album. During the three weeks leading up to the release of Meridional, the band held a contest giving away their instruments used to record the album. One grand prize winner, chosen at random from their online mailing list per week, was awarded a drum kit, electric guitar or bass guitar. A runner-up was also chosen and awarded various autographed Norma Jean merchandise.

=== Post-release ===
Meridional was released on July 12, 2010, in the UK and on July 13 in the US. The release date coincided with the start of the 2010 Mayhem Festival featuring Norma Jean and headlined by Korn and Rob Zombie.

During the week of release for Meridional, Norma Jean/Razor & Tie released a promotional television advertisement for the album. The ad used clips from the music video for "Deathbed Atheist" in addition to quotes from various professional reviews praising the album. The full music video for "Deathbed Atheist" was officially released on July 21, 2010. It was directed by Linus Johansson of Popcore Film.

Norma Jean recorded a total of 13 songs and three interludes during the Meridional sessions. The band planned on using eleven songs for the album, and release the rest as B-sides for "other things down the road." The previously released demo song "Kill More Presidents" was re-recorded with a new ending, and was intended to be officially released at some point. It was later added to the Best Buy version of the album as a bonus track. Originally revealed in an April 2010 studio blog post, the B-side "Distance to Planets" was released as an iTunes Meridional bonus track.

== Reception ==
Professional ratings
Review scores
Source	Rating
About.com	2.5/5 stars
AbsolutePunk	(90%)
Allmusic	4/5 stars
Bloody Disgusting	4.5/5
BLARE Magazine	4/5 stars
Exclaim!	Very highly favorable
Jesus Freak Hideout	Wayne Reimer: Michael Weaver:
Revolver	4/5 stars
Rock Sound	(8/10)
Sputnikmusic	(3/5)

Initial reception has been generally positive, with Norma Jean claiming on their Myspace page that early-listen reviews from Decibel Magazine, Alternative Press, and Revolver have named "Meridional" one of the band's best albums to date.

In its first week of sales, Meridional sold 9,800 copies in the US and opened at number 45 on the Billboard 200. Norma Jean's previous studio album, The Anti Mother, sold over 16,000 copies and debuted at number 29 on the Billboard 200 in 2008.

Meridional received the No. 3 spot in Exclaim!'s 2010 Metal Albums of the Year.

== Track listing ==
All tracks are written by Norma Jean

No.	Title	Length
1.	"Leaderless and Self Enlisted"	3:20
2.	"The Anthem of the Angry Brides"	2:32
3.	"Deathbed Atheist"	5:06
4.	"Bastardizer"	3:15
5.	"A Media Friendly Turn for the Worse"	4:12
6.	"Septentrional"	1:37
7.	"Blood Burner"	4:02
8.	"High Noise Low Output"	3:26
9.	"Falling from the Sky: Day Seven"	6:17
10.	"Everlasting Tapeworm"	3:15
11.	"Occidental"	1:37
12.	"The People That Surround You on a Regular Basis"	3:42
13.	"Innocent Bystanders United"	25:03
Total length:		67:24

Notes

- The song "Innocent Bystanders United" ends at 8:25. After 15 minutes of silence [8:25 - 23:25] begins the hidden track "Oriental"

Best Buy and Napster version
No.	Title	Length
14.	"Kill More Presidents"	4:27
15.	"Deathbed Atheist" (KC Blitz remix)	4:45

Hot Topic and ShockHound version
No.	Title	Length
14.	"Deathbed Atheist" (The Juggernaut remix)	3:22

iTunes version
No.	Title	Length
14.	"Distance to Planets"	4:02

== Personnel ==
Norma Jean

- Cory Brandan – vocals, guitars
- Chris Day – guitars
- Scottie Henry – guitars
- Chris Raines – drums, percussion
- Jake Schultz – bass guitar

Production and recording

- Justin Chapman – assistant engineering, Pro Tools editing
- Jeremy SH Griffith – production, engineering, mixing

Additional musicians

- Shelby Cinca (Frodus) – guest vocals on "Everlasting Tapeworm"
- Jeremy SH Griffith – organ on "Falling from the Sky: Day Seven," guitars, piano on "Innocent Bystanders United," backing vocals on "A Media Friendly Turn for the Worse," "Septentrional," "Falling from the Sky: Day Seven," "The People That Surround You on a Regular Basis," and "Innocent Bystanders United"
- Kyle Henderson – guitar technician
- Troy Stains – lap steel guitar on "Everlasting Tapeworm"

Artwork and layout

- Jason Oda (StarvingEyes) – album art

== Chart performance ==
Chart (2010)	Peak position
Billboard 200	45
Billboard Christian Albums	2
Billboard Hard Rock Albums	6
Billboard Rock Albums	15
