= Cory Brandan =

American vocalist (born 1976)

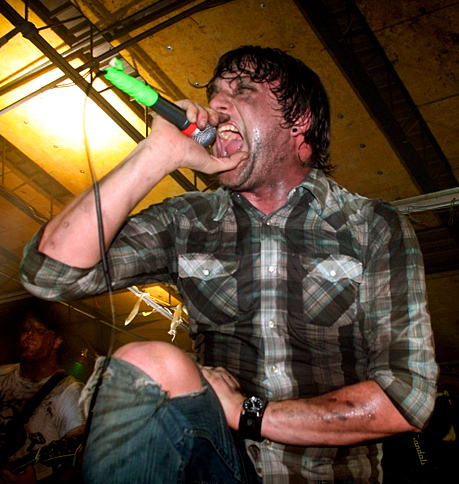
- Brandan performing in 2007

Background information
- Born: Cory Brandan Putman; April 11, 1976 (age 50)
- Genres: Metalcore; post-hardcore; mathcore; sludge metal; hardcore punk; post-metal; alternative metal
- Occupations: Singer; musician; songwriter
- Instruments: Vocals; guitar; bass
- Years active: 1995–present
- Member of: Norma Jean; Fear is the Driving Force; The Radio Sky; Hundred Suns
- Formerly of: Eso-Charis; Living Sacrifice; The Handshake Murders; Uses Fire

Cory Brandan Putman (born April 11, 1976) is an American singer who has been the lead vocalist for the metalcore band Norma Jean since 2004.

== Career ==
Brandan is a former member of bands Eso-Charis, Living Sacrifice, The Handshake Murders, and Uses Fire, and a current member of the bands Norma Jean, Fear is the Driving Force and The Radio Sky. He was one of the founding members of Mathcore band Eso-Charis, along with his brother, Matthew Putman and Arthur Green who eventually went on to join the band Living Sacrifice. He played guitar for a tour through Norway and Sweden with Living Sacrifice, before being replaced by Rocky Gray (who would go on to play drums in Evanescence and guitar in Soul Embraced).

Brandan then toured with and later joined Norma Jean permanently as their lead vocalist, replacing former vocalist Josh Scogin. Since Brandan has joined Norma Jean, they have released seven records; O God, the Aftermath released in 2005, Redeemer in 2006, The Anti Mother, which was released on August 5, 2008, through Solid State Records, Meridional released July 12, 2010, through Razor & Tie, and Wrongdoers on August 6, 2013. Polar Similar released September 9, 2016, and All Hail on October 25, 2019. The Anti Mother featured guest writing and vocals by notable artists Chino Moreno of Deftones, Page Hamilton of Helmet, and Cove Reber of Saosin.

In 2015, Brandan formed a project, "Hundred Suns", with former Every Time I Die musician Ryan "Legs" Leger and Dead and Divine's Chris LeMasters.

== UNwork ==
In late 2008 Brandan created graphic and clothing design company UNwork. Since UNwork's conception, Brandan has designed for bands small and large across the country. Putman has said that he uses his experiences as a former struggling band member to shape how he runs the company and that he understands the necessities of keeping designs inexpensive to print, and specializes in these cheap-to-print one and two color designs.

On the UNwork Myspace, Brandan writes: "I have been doing UNwork for years now, it's not really important how long exactly. I have been doing other things for the past 6 years (Norma Jean, The Radio Sky and Fear is the Driving Force) and it has kept me away from this almost completely. I have always been interested in all kinds of art and have recently really wanted to do UNwork again."

== Personal life ==
Brandan has three brothers, one older, two younger: Tristen, Matt, and Adam Putman. He is the father of two children, and is married to artist and photographer Rachel Rodemann.

== Bands ==
Band	Years active
Eso-Charis	1995–2002
Living Sacrifice	1998, 2003
Uses Fire	2002-2004
Norma Jean	2004–present
Fear is the Driving Force	2008–present
The Radio Sky	
The Handshake Murders	
Hundred Suns	2015–present
OrphanTwin	2022-present

== Discography ==
With Eso-Charis

- The Plateau Green (1997)
- Eso-Charis (1998)
- Setting Roots for Winter 7-inch (2000)

With Norma Jean

- O God, the Aftermath (2005)
- Redeemer (2006)
- The Anti Mother (2008)
- Meridional (2010)
- Wrongdoers (2013)
- Polar Similar (2016)
- All Hail (2019)
- Deathrattle Sing for Me (2022)

With Fear Is the Driving Force

- Volume Zero (2009)

With Hundred Suns

- The Prestaliis (2017)

With OrphanTwin

- Future Classic (2022)

Guest vocals

- Last Chance to Breathe by Spoken (2005)
- The March by Unearth (2008)
- Rising Sun by Stray from the Path (2011)
- Raise the Dead by Le Castle Vania (2013)
- Everything Was Sound by Silent Planet (2016)
- "White Noises" on the Violence EP by My Epic (2019)
- OMNI, Pt. 1 by Project 86 (2023)
- "Outbreak" by P.O.D. (2026)
