= Spoken =

Spoken is the past participle form of the verb "to speak".

Spoken may also refer to:

- Spoken (app), an augmentative and alternative communication tool
- Spoken (band), a Christian rock group from Tennessee
- Spoken (album), an album by Spoken

== See also ==
- Speak (disambiguation)
