= Polar Similar =

Studio album by Norma Jean
- Released: September 9, 2016
- Recorded: January 2016
- Studio: Pachyderm Studios in Cannon Falls, Minnesota
- Genre: Metalcore; mathcore; post-hardcore; post-metal; noise rock
- Length: 53:14
- Label: Solid State
- Producer: Josh Barber, Norma Jean

Norma Jean chronology
Wrongdoers (2013)	Polar Similar (2016)	All Hail (2019)

Singles from Polar Similar
- 1. "1,000,000 Watts" Released: June 14, 2016; 2. "Forever Hurtling Towards Andromeda" Released: August 12, 2016

Professional ratings
Review scores
Source	Rating
Blabbermouth	8.5/10
Exclaim!	8/10
Jesus Freak Hideout	4.5/5 stars
Metal Hammer	4/5 stars
Metal Injection	9/10
New Noise Magazine	4.5/5 stars

Polar Similar is the seventh studio album by American metalcore band Norma Jean. The album was released on September 9, 2016, through Solid State Records, the band's first release on the label since 2008's The Anti Mother. This is Norma Jean's only release with guitarist Phillip Farris and the last with bassist John Finnegan and drummer Clayton Holyoak.

With the departure of guitarist Chris Day in 2015, Polar Similar is the first Norma Jean album to not feature any original members.

== Recording and production ==
The album was recorded in January 2016 at Pachyderm Studios in Cannon Falls, Minnesota, where artists such as Nirvana, Failure, P.J. Harvey, and Explosions in the Sky have recorded albums. The album was produced by Josh Barber and the band. The title of the song "Everyone Talking Over Everyone Else" is a tribute to Lemmy of Motörhead, while the song itself is about an abusive relationship that vocalist Cory Brandan Putman was in. "1,000,000 Watts" is one of only a few songs by the band containing profanity in the lyrics, something controversial amongst the Christian music scene, with its use of the word "fuck" towards the end.

== Release ==
"1,000,000 Watts" was the first song to be released from the album, premiering on June 14, 2016. The album was released on September 9 through Solid State Records, the band's first release on the label since 2008's The Anti Mother. Four days later, on September 13, a music video was released for the song "Everyone Talking Over Everyone Else." The video, directed by Anthony Altamura, shows the band performing the song in a dimly lit room along with footage of people in abusive relationships.

== Track listing ==
All tracks are written by Norma Jean.

No.	Title	Length
1.	"I. The Planet"	3:03
2.	"Everyone Talking Over Everyone Else"	3:27
3.	"Forever Hurtling Towards Andromeda" (featuring Sean Ingram)	2:16
4.	"1,000,000 Watts"	4:28
5.	"II. The People"	2:14
6.	"Death Is a Living Partner"	2:18
7.	"Synthetic Sun"	3:50
8.	"Reaction"	5:42
9.	"III. The Nebula"	3:16
10.	"The Close and Discontent"	2:34
11.	"An Ocean of War"	3:28
12.	"A Thousand Years a Minute"	5:58
13.	"IV. The Nexus"	10:40

Deluxe Vinyl Bonus Track
No.	Title	Length
14.	"Children of the Dead"	3:07

== Personnel ==
Norma Jean

- Cory Brandan – vocals, guitar
- Jeff Hickey – guitar
- Phillip Farris – guitar
- John Finnegan – bass
- Clayton Holyoak – drums, auxiliary percussion

Additional personnel

- Josh Holyoak – Sound design, keyboards, ambient sounds, and additional percussion throughout the album. Production at the end of track 13
- Adam Putman – additional percussion, piano and organ on tracks 4 and 13, background vocals on track 8
- Ben "Bob" Turkovic – additional percussion, engineering
- Sean Ingram – additional vocals on track 3
- Josh Barber – production, additional guitars on tracks 1 and 2
- Norma Jean – production
- Josh Barber – engineering
- Jeremy S.H. Griffith – mixing
- Drew Lavyne – mastering
