= Oxford Basement Collection =

Studio album by El Obo
- Released: 2012
- Recorded: 2004–2009
- Genres: Folk, indie rock, acoustic
- Length: 41:03
- Label: Esperanza Plantation
- Producer: Jesse Coppenbarger

El Obo chronology
| All Your Courts & Castles (2007) | Oxford Basement Collection (2012) |

Oxford Basement Collection is the first official release from El Obo, the solo acoustic project of Jesse Coppenbarger, vocalist of Colour Revolt.

== History ==
Between 2004 and 2009, Jesse Coppenbarger, Justin Showah, Steven Konrad Bevilaqua, Phillip Blackwell, David Gilmore, Cole Furlow, Kinney Kimbrough, Lyon Chadwich, and Joey Miller worked and played on Oxford Basement Collection, but not all at the same time. The album was recorded at The Train Station in Jackson, Mississippi, The Timberlake House in Oxford, Mississippi by Steven Konrad Bevilaqua, The Voyager's Rest, Delta Recording Service, and in an abandoned silo on Jimbo Mathus' property in Como, Mississippi by Justin Showah. The album was mixed at Black Wings Studio by Winn McElroy with Jesse Coppenbarger and Justin Showah. The album was mastered to vinyl at Ardent Studios.

== Reception ==
Oxford Basement Collection received moderate to mixed reviews. The Blue Indian gave the album an 8.4 rating out of 10, saying "Coppenbarger has a soul to be reckoned with, and this shines through and through", while Alt Press said "the songs often meander a little aimlessly, or become too sleepy for their own good." Paste Magazine said "on one side, you've got gorgeous tracks like the acoustic "Young Ones" and accomplished songs like "Vrgn Evl", which brings to mind the finest, mature moments of Conor Oberst's catalogue. But here too are selections like "The Ordinary Woman", which just drags and drags, or "Everyone of the Hungry", which sounds like it was fun to record but maybe should've been left on the cutting-room floor.

== Track listing ==
1. "W8 Off My Mind" – 4:43
2. "On the Eighth Day" – 2:57
3. "The Ordinary Woman" – 4:55
4. "JC vs. the DRs" – 4:28
5. "Everyone of the Hungry" – 2:59
6. "Young Ones" – 3:15
7. "This is Love" – 4:23
8. "2nite" – 3:50
9. "Vrgn Evl" – 4:37
10. "BTK" – 4:56

Deluxe edition bonus tracks
| No. | Title | Length |
|---|---|---|
| 11. | "Broken Arm" | 3:02 |
| 12. | "Drones" | 2:37 |
| 13. | "Everyone of the Hungry (extended version)" | 6:00 |
