= What Remains =

What Remains may refer to:

- What Remains (book), a 2003 photography book by Sally Mann
- What Remains (novella), a 1990 novella by Christa Wolf
- What Remains (TV series), a 2013 British drama series
- ...What Remains, a 1999 album by Spoken
- What Remains: The Life and Work of Sally Mann, a 2005 documentary film about Sally Mann
- What Remains (2022 American film), an American independent film
- What Remains (2022 international film), an internationally produced mystery film
- What Remains (2026 film), a Turkish drama film
- "What Remains", a song by Foals on their 2010 studio album Total Life Forever
