= Daniel Davison =

American drummer

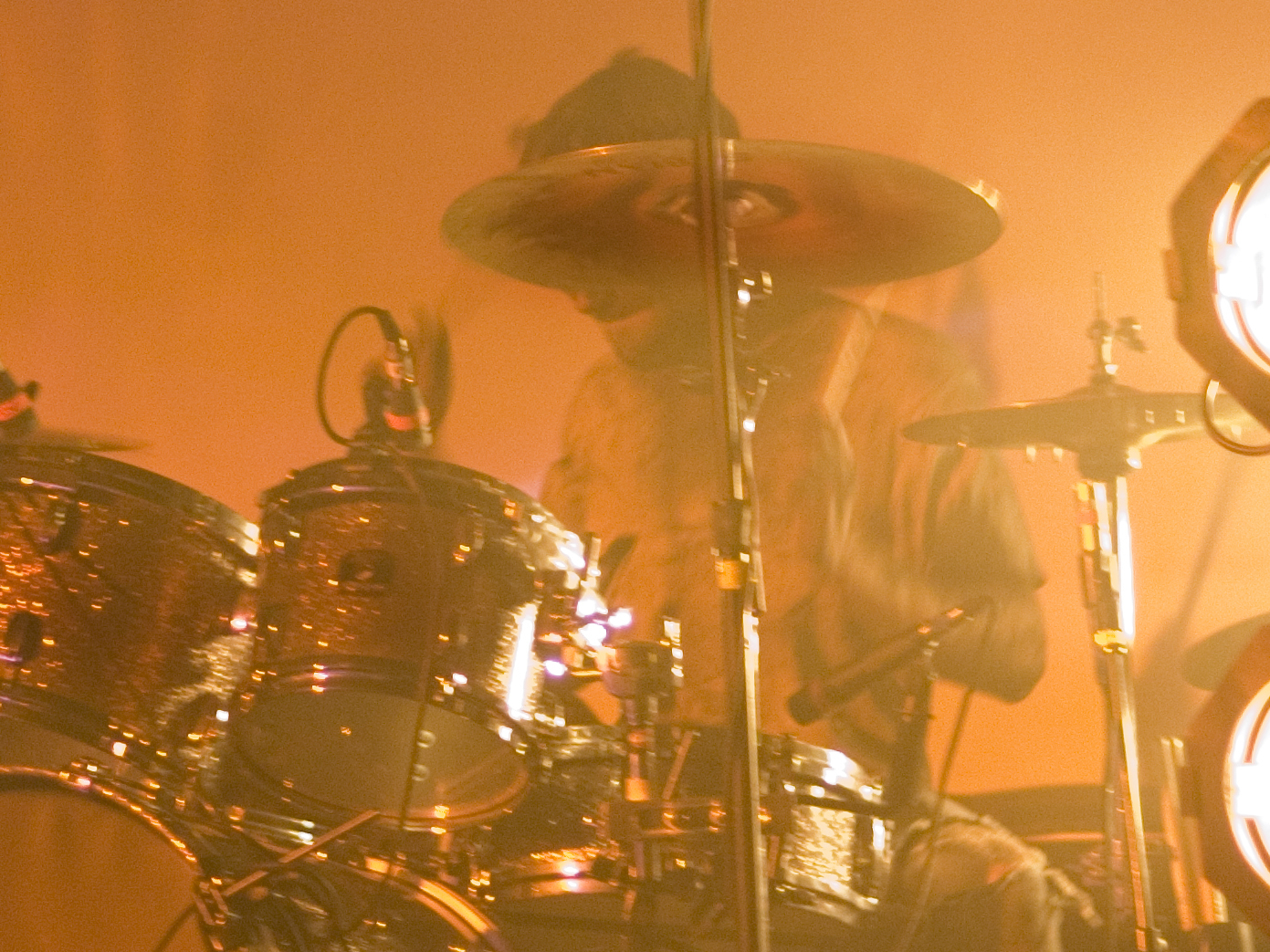
- Davison with Norma Jean in 2006

Background information
- Born: Daniel Travis Davison; January 28, 1983 (age 43); Douglasville, Georgia, U.S.
- Genres: Heavy metal; groove metal; post-hardcore; metalcore; indie rock; mathcore; hardcore punk
- Occupations: Musician; songwriter; artist; filmmaker
- Instruments: Drums; percussion
- Years active: 1997–present
- Labels: Epitaph; Roadrunner; Solid State; Tooth & Nail; Dualtone; Century; Abacus; EMI

Daniel Travis Davison (born January 28, 1983) is an American musician, songwriter, artist, and filmmaker. He is also a co-founder and former drummer of the bands Norma Jean, Underoath and Every Time I Die.

== Early life ==
Davison was born on January 28, 1983, in Douglasville, Georgia, where he first learned to play the drums and started his musical career.

== Career ==
=== Norma Jean ===
In 1997, Davison co-founded the band Luti-Kriss. They changed their name to Norma Jean after having been confused for the rapper with a similar sounding name, Ludacris.

=== Colour Revolt ===
In early 2010, Davison joined the indie rock band, Colour Revolt. He played several shows with them and recorded drums on their latest record, The Cradle.

=== Underoath ===
In May 2010, Davison succeeded drummer Aaron Gillespie in the band Underoath before the group disbanded in 2013. Davison helped write and record what was thought to be Underoath's last and final record, Ø (Disambiguation).

When Underoath reunited in 2015, Davison was not featured in the new line-up due to Gillespie coming back in the band.

=== Every Time I Die ===
In February 2015, Davison replaced Ryan "Legs" Leger in the band Every Time I Die until 2017. He has since also released solo songs.

== Other projects ==
=== Film and video career ===
Davison has directed and produced music videos. His most recent videos include the final music video for the band Anberlin for the song "Stranger Ways," and mewithoutYou's "Dorothy" and "Red Cow."

A list of his clients include:

- Sony/BMG Recording Group
- Epitaph Records
- Solid State Records
- EMI
- Virgin Records
- Warner Music Group
- Anberlin
- Delta Spirit
- Blessthefall
- '68
- Owsla recording artist Kill the Noise
- Letlive
- mewithoutYou
- For Today
- Norma Jean
- August Burns Red
- Brian "Head" Welch from Korn's band Love & Death
- Manchester Orchestra
- The Showdown

== Discography ==
=== Luti-Kriss ===
- Luti-Kriss/Travail Split 7" (1999)
- 5ep (2000)
- Throwing Myself (2001)

=== Norma Jean ===
- Norma Jean / MewithoutYou (2002)
- Bless the Martyr and Kiss the Child (2002)
- O God, the Aftermath (2005)
- Redeemer (2006)

=== Colour Revolt ===
- The Cradle (2010)

=== With Underoath ===
- Lost in the Sound of Separation (additional drum tracks) (2008)
- Ø (Disambiguation) (2010)
- Anthology: 1999–2013 (2012)

=== With Every Time I Die ===
- Salem (2015)
- Low Teens (2016)
