= Deathrattle Sing for Me =

Studio album by Norma Jean
- Released: August 12, 2022
- Recorded: 2021
- Venue: The Loft Studio, Los Angeles
- Genre: Metalcore, alternative metal, post-hardcore, sludge metal
- Length: 53:08
- Label: Solid State
- Producer: Jeremy SH Griffith; Matthew Putman; Norma Jean

Norma Jean chronology
| All Hail (2019) | Deathrattle Sing for Me (2022) |

Singles from Deathrattle Sing for Me
- 1. "Call for the Blood" Released: June 15, 2022; 2. "Spearmint Revolt" Released: July 6, 2022; 3. "Sleep Explosion" Released: July 20, 2022

Deathrattle Sing for Me is the ninth studio album by American metalcore band Norma Jean. The album was released on August 12, 2022, through Solid State Records. It was self-produced by the band, Matthew Putman and Jeremy SH Griffith.

Professional ratings
Review scores
| Source | Rating |
|---|---|
| Distorted Sound | 7/10 |
| HM | 5/5 stars |
| Jesus Freak Hideout | 5/5 stars |
| Kerrang! | 3/5 stars |
| Louder Sound | 4/5 stars |
| Metal Injection | 8/10 |
| New Noise | 4/5 stars |

== Track listing ==
All tracks are written by Cory Brandan, Grayson Stewart, Matt Marquez and Matthew Putman, except where noted.

Deathrattle Sing for Me track listing
| No. | Title | Writer(s) | Length |
|---|---|---|---|
| 1. | "1994" | Putman | 3:32 |
| 2. | "Call for the Blood" | | 3:14 |
| 3. | "Spearmint Revolt" | | 5:02 |
| 4. | "Memorial Hoard" | | 4:49 |
| 5. | "Aria Obscura" | | 4:44 |
| 6. | "Any%" | | 2:46 |
| 7. | "Parallella" | | 1:40 |
| 8. | "W W A V V E" | | 3:35 |
| 9. | "A Killing Word" | | 4:44 |
| 10. | "Penny Margs" | | 5:53 |
| 11. | "El-roi" | | 1:42 |
| 12. | "Sleep Explosion" | | 3:08 |
| 13. | "Heartache" | | 8:13 |
| Total length: | | | 53:08 |

== Personnel ==
Norma Jean

- Cory Brandan – vocals, guitar, bass, synth, production
- Grayson Stewart – guitar, bass, backing vocals, vocals on "Parallella", production
- Matt Marquez – drums, percussion, sound design, production

Additional personnel

- Matthew Putman – sound design, percussion, piano, synth, backing vocals, drums on "Call For The Blood"
- Jeremy SH Griffith – modular synth, piano, sound design, backing vocals, mixing
- Jonathan Berlin – mastering
