= Illusion (Spoken album) =

Studio album by Spoken
- Released: February 12, 2013
- Genre: Christian metal, heavy metal, hard rock, alternative metal
- Length: 41:47
- Label: eOne
- Producer: Jasen Rauch

Spoken chronology
Spoken (2007)	Illusion (2013)	Breathe Again (2015)

Singles from Illusion
- 1. "Through It All" Released: 2013; 2. "Calm the Storm" Released: 2013

Illusion is the seventh studio album from Spoken. E1 Music released the album on February 12, 2013. Spoken worked with Jasen Rauch, on the production of this album.

== Critical reception ==
Professional ratings
Review scores
Source	Rating
Alternative Press	3.5/5 stars
CCM Magazine	3/5 stars
HM Magazine	3.5/5 stars
Indie Vision Music	5/5 stars
Jesus Freak Hideout	4/5 stars

Awarding the album three and a half stars for Alternative Press, Jason Schreurs writes, "a super-solid riff-rock album". Dan MacIntosh, giving the album three and a half stars at HM Magazine, states, "Spoken has come back with fists a flying, with plenty of sonic firepower still at its disposal." Rating the album three stars from CCM Magazine, Matt Conner says, "Spoken is prepped for a strong re-entry into the market". Wayne Myatt, signaling in a four star review from Jesus Freak Hideout, describes, "Spoken has made a remarkable return with an achievement that surpasses all of their preceding efforts." Indicating in a four star review at Jesus Freak Hideout, Michael Weaver responds, "While their self-titled was a bit of a disappointment, especially with Baird's weakest vocal attempt, Illusion is far from a let-down." Assigning a five star review on the album for Indie Vision Music, Lee Brown replies, "Spoken returns with a powerful and nearly flawless album that is beautifully aggressive and powerfully tender as it balances two distinct sounds that few other bands could blend so masterfully together on one album."

== Track listing ==
No.	Title	Writer(s)	Length
1.	"Stand Alone"	Anthony Armstrong, Jasen Rauch, Joe Rickard, Spoken	2:51
2.	"Beneath the Surface"	Rauch, Spoken	2:40
3.	"Don't Go"	Mark Holman, Rauch, Spoken	2:53
4.	"Through It All"	Rauch, Spoken	3:37
5.	"More Than You Know"	Holman, Rauch, Spoken	4:01
6.	"Remember the Day"	Rauch, Spoken	3:37
7.	"Shadow Over Me"	Rauch, Spoken	3:03
8.	"Accuser"	Jesse McDermott, Rauch, Spoken	3:41
9.	"Take Everything"	Rauch, Spoken	3:44
10.	"Tonight"	Rauch, Spoken	4:27
11.	"Calm the Storm"	Rauch, Spoken	3:43
12.	"Illusion"	Rauch, Spoken	3:37
Total length:			41:47

== Chart performance ==
Chart (2013)	Peak position
US Christian Albums (Billboard)	28
US Top Hard Rock Albums (Billboard)	25
US Heatseekers Albums (Billboard)	11

== Personnel ==
Spoken

- Matt Baird – lead vocals
- Ryan Pei – bass guitar, backing vocals
- Oliver Crumpton – drums, art design
- Jeff Cunningham- guitar
- Jesse McDermott – guitar

Production

- Jasen Rauch – production, mixing, audio engineer
- Ainsile Grosser – mixing
- Dan Shike – mastering
- Joe Rickard – drum editing, digital editing

Additional personnel

- Jasen Rauch – keyboards, programming, songwriting
- Mark Holman – additional backing vocals, songwriting
- Anthony Armstrong – songwriter (1)
- Joe Rickard – songwriter (1)
- Corey Bernhardt – artwork

Management

- Jason Fowler – management
- Aaron Manes – A&R
