= All Hail (Norma Jean album) =

Studio album by Norma Jean
- Released: October 25, 2019
- Studios: Graphic Nature Audio, Belleville, New Jersey
- Genres: Metalcore, alternative metal, sludge metal, post-hardcore
- Length: 45:31
- Label: Solid State
- Producer: Will Putney

Norma Jean chronology
Polar Similar (2016)	All Hail (2019)	Deathrattle Sing for Me (2022)

Singles from All Hail
- 1. "[Mind Over Mind]" Released: July 19, 2019; 2. "Landslide Defeater" Released: August 15, 2019; 3. "/with_errors" Released: September 19, 2019; 4. "Safety Last" Released: October 4, 2019

Professional ratings
Review scores
Source	Rating
Exclaim!	7/10.
Jesus Freak Hideout	4.5/5 stars
Kerrang!	4/5 stars
New Noise Magazine	5/5 stars

All Hail is the eighth studio album by American metalcore band Norma Jean. The album was released on October 25, 2019 through Solid State Records, the band's sixth overall release on the label. It is the last album to feature guitarist Jeff Hickey, as well as the first to feature guitarist Grayson Stewart and drummer Matt Marquez.

== Recording and production ==
All Hail was recorded by producer Will Putney at Graphic Nature Audio in Belleville, New Jersey.

== Release ==
The album was announced July 17, 2019, with the first single off the album, [Mind Over Mind], debuting two days later on July 19, 2019. The band would later release a music video for [Mind Over Mind] on August 9, 2019. The second single, Landslide Defeater, released on August 15, 2019. A third single, "/with_errors", was released on September 19, 2019. The album's fourth single, "Safety Last", was released on October 4, 2019.

== Track listing ==
All tracks are written by Norma Jean, except as noted.

No.	Title	Writer(s)	Length
1.	"Orphan Twin"		1:56
2.	"[Mind Over Mind]"		2:38
3.	"Safety Last"	Norma Jean, Chris LeMasters	3:44
4.	"Volunteer Tooth Filing"		0:41
5.	"Landslide Defeater"		3:19
6.	"Full Circle in Under a Minute"		3:27
7.	"/with_errors"		3:59
8.	"Trace Levels of Dystopia"		3:24
9.	"Translational"		4:28
10.	"Extra Dimensional Palate Cleanser"		0:32
11.	"If [Loss] Then [Leader]"		4:28
12.	"Careen"		5:39
13.	"Anna" (feat. Garrett Russell of Silent Planet)		5:22
14.	"The Mirror & the Second Veil"		1:54
Total length:			45:31

== Personnel ==
Norma Jean

- Cory Brandan – vocals, guitar, bass
- Jeff Hickey – guitar, bass
- Grayson Stewart – guitar, bass
- Matt Marquez – drums, auxiliary percussion

Additional musicians

- Garrett Russell – vocals (13)
- Matthew Putman – drums, percussion, engineering, songwriting, additional vocals (9)

Production

- Will Putney – recording, engineering, mixing, mastering, production
