= The Handshake Murders =

American metalcore band

- Origin: Fort Smith, Arkansas, U.S.
- Genres: Mathcore; metalcore; sludgecore; death metal
- Years active: 2000–2011
- Labels: Goodfellow
- Spinoff of: Eso-Charis, Norma Jean
- Past members: Jayson Holmes; John Ridenour; Brian Evans; Jeff Hickey; Cory Brandan Putman; Daniel Wiggins; Bryce Lucien; Jeff King; Brandon Rogers; Keith Baskett

The Handshake Murders was an American mathcore and metalcore band from Fort Smith, Arkansas. It included many members from Eso-Charis and Norma Jean. When Eso-Charis, disbanded, Holmes made The Handshake Murders full-time. The band has released one full-length album, and two EPs. The band has been compared to Coalesce, Meshuggah, Opeth, and A Life Once Lost. After 10 years of being active, the band broke-up.

== Members ==
- Jayson Holmes – vocals (ex-Eso-Charis) (2000–2011)
- Brian Evans – guitar (2002–2011)
- John Ridenour – guitar (2001–2010)
- Cory Brandan Putman – guitar (ex-Eso-Charis, ex-Living Sacrifice, Norma Jean)
- Jeremy Joplin – guitar (2000-2003)
- Bryce Lucien – guitar (2008–2011)
- Jeff Hickey – guitar, bass (Norma Jean) (2000–2008)
- Brandon Rogers – guitar, bass (2009–2011)
- Keith Baskett – bass (2008–2009)
- Daniel "Dan" Wiggins – drums (2000–2008)
- Jeff King – drums (2008–2011)

== Discography ==
Studio albums

- Usurper

EPs

- Bury the Effigy (2002)
- Essays in the Progression of Man (2005)

Compilation appearances

- "Messenger" on End Times, released through Goodfellow Records
