= Breathe Again (Spoken album) =

Studio album by Spoken
- Released: December 11, 2015
- Genres: Hard rock, alternative metal, christian rock, christian metal
- Length: 45:00
- Label: Artery
- Producer: Cameron Mizell

Spoken chronology
Illusion (2013)	Breathe Again (2015)	IX (2017)

Breathe Again is the eighth studio album from Spoken. Artery Recordings released the album on December 11, 2015.

== Critical reception ==
Professional ratings
Review scores
Source	Rating
Anchor Music News	4.3/5
The Christian Beat	4.8/5
HM Magazine	3.5/5 stars
Jesus Freak Hideout	4/5 stars
Jesus Wired	76%
New Release Today	4/5 stars

Keith Stanley, indicating in a three and a half review from HM Magazine, says, "Breathe Again is a fresh take for this trio." Awarding the album four stars at Jesus Freak Hideout, Christopher Smith writes, "this project warrants many spins as it is one [of] the strongest rock albums to come out this year." Kevin Hoskins, rating the album four stars for Jesus Freak Hideout, says, "Spoken has not disappointed." Giving the album four stars from New Release Today, Mary Nikkel states, "With Breathe Again, Spoken proves themselves to be on the cutting edge of the best elements of hard rock: haunting combinations of guitar tones and electronic elements, smooth vocals sending melodies soaring and lyrics that are as honest as they are ultimately redemptive." Michael Weaver, indicating in a four star review by Jesus Freak Hideout, describes, "Matt Baird has done just that with Spoken as Illusion and Breathe Again are quite possible the band's best work. Folks should be jamming Spoken's latest album for some time to come." Signaling in a 4.8 out of five review at The Christian Beat, Chris Major writes, "The album’s tracks range from higher energy to calmer motion, yet all are brilliantly orchestrated. Listening even a few songs in, it is clear that Spoken has released their best work yet." Rating the album a 76-percent for Jesus Wired, Topher Parks states, "Breathe Again is a solid release from Spoken and proves once again why they’re one of the few bands still alive and kicking from the ‘90s Christian rock scene." Allocating the album a 4.3 star review at Anchor Music News, Rob Clark writes, "This is an album which heralds a band coming back with more energy and passion...The vocals, instrumentation, and vocals stand out."

== Track listing ==
No.	Title	Length
1.	"Intro"	0:53
2.	"Walking in My Dreams"	3:32
3.	"Beyond the Stars"	3:29
4.	"Surrender"	3:31
5.	"Breathe Again" (featuring Matty Mullins)	3:20
6.	"All I Wanted"	3:48
7.	"Hollow and Untrue"	3:58
8.	"Memories Are Alive"	3:46
9.	"Nothing Without You"	3:23
10.	"Poison in the Air"	3:27
11.	"Falling Apart"	3:38
12.	"Hold On"	3:33
13.	"Take My Breath Away"	3:36
14.	"Outro"	1:06
Total length:		45:00

== Chart performance ==
Chart (2016)	Peak position
US Top Christian Albums (Billboard)	24
US Top Hard Rock Albums (Billboard)	12
US Heatseekers Albums (Billboard)	3
US Independent Albums (Billboard)	27
US Top Rock Albums (Billboard)	46
