= A Moment of Imperfect Clarity =

2003 studio album by Spoken

Studio album by Spoken
- Released: September 2, 2003
- Genres: Alternative rock, Christian rock
- Length: 45:14
- Label: Tooth & Nail
- Producer: GGGarth

Spoken chronology
Spoken Greatest Hits (2001)	A Moment of Imperfect Clarity (2003)	Last Chance to Breathe (2005)

A Moment of Imperfect Clarity is the fourth album by the Christian rock band Spoken. It was their first to be released on Tooth & Nail Records.

== Critical reception ==
Professional ratings
Review scores
Source	Rating
AllMusic	2/5 stars
Christianity Today	4/5 stars
Cross Rhythms	6/10 squares
Jesus Freak Hideout	4/5 stars
The Phantom Tollbooth	5/5 stars 4.5/5 stars
Punknews.org	1.5/5 stars

Reception to the album was mixed. Awarding the album two stars for AllMusic, Rick Anderson wrote, "this is nothing more than solid, competent, and forgettable stuff." Scott Heisel, giving the album one and a half stars at Punknews.org, called it "completely forgettable." Reviewing the album for Exclaim!, Sam Sutherland wrote, "A Moment of Imperfect Clarity delivers on its promise — not perfection, but respite from the mirthless nature of so many of today's emo acts." Ben Lilford, rating the album a six out of ten from Cross Rhythms, said, "It doesn't deserve to but it will probably sell millions."

In a four star review by Christianity Today, Russ Breimeier described, "Spoken makes a triumphant emotionally charged return on A Moment of Imperfect Clarity." Josh Taylor, signaling in a four star review at Jesus Freak Hideout, commented, "This is Spoken's best work to date, period." Assigning the album a five out of five for The Phantom Tollbooth, Len Nash replied, "Before people start to shun Spoken, taking some time to check out the new sound and reading some of the lyrics will allow the listener to make the best educated decision possible." Josh Marihugh, allocating a four and a half out of five review from The Phantom Tollbooth, responded, "While this CD may not be quite as musically groundbreaking as [Echoes of the Spirit Still Dwell], it's definitely a fine album, full of well-crafted melodic modern rock and beautiful lyrics."

== Track listing ==
No.	Title	Length
1.	"Across These Waters"	2:31
2.	"Promise"	4:27
3.	"Breath in the Fog"	5:11
4.	"Falling Further"	3:33
5.	"Sleep Well Tonight"	4:10
6.	"A World Away"	4:21
7.	"Learning to Forget"	4:46
8.	"In Dreams"	3:06
9.	"Seasons Change"	3:45
10.	"Remembered"	3:42
11.	"How Long"	5:36
Total length:		45:14
