= Last Chance to Breathe =

Studio album by Spoken
- Released: August 30, 2005
- Genres: Christian hardcore, alternative metal
- Length: 42:16
- Label: Tooth & Nail
- Producer: Travis Wyrick

Spoken chronology
A Moment of Imperfect Clarity (2003)	Last Chance to Breathe (2005)	Spoken (2007)

Last Chance to Breathe is the fifth studio album from the Christian rock band Spoken.

== Critical reception ==
Professional ratings
Review scores
Source	Rating
Christianity Today	3/5 stars
Cross Rhythms	8/10 squares
Jesus Freak Hideout	3.5/5 stars
The Phantom Tollbooth	3.5/5 stars

Awarding the album three stars for Christianity Today, Russ Breimeier states, "this is still a fine entry for the genre." Josh Taylor, giving the album three and a half stars at Jesus Freak Hideout, describes, "Last Time to Breathe is one tasty treat." Rating the album an eight out of ten from Cross Rhythms, Tony Cummings writes, "'Last Chance To Breathe' is well above average." Sarah Verno, indicating in a three and a half out of five review by The Phantom Tollbooth, says, "Last Chance to Breathe...is a reasonably solid album that’s worth checking out." Reviewing the album for The Phantom Tollbooth, Justin Wright comments, "this album will please old Spoken fans while allowing them to continue to reach out to new fans alike."

== Track listing ==
No.	Title	Length
1.	"September"	3:23
2.	"Wind in My Sails"	3:40
3.	"Love in Return"	3:36
4.	"Everything Is Burning"	2:59
5.	"1992"	4:02
6.	"Last Chance to Breathe"	3:58
7.	"Bitter Taste" (featuring Cory Putman from Norma Jean)	2:08
8.	"From the Inside"	3:41
9.	"Home"	3:26
10.	"4th Street"	4:00
11.	"Time After Time"	3:21
12.	"You're Still Waiting"	3:54
Total length:		38:15

== Chart performance ==
Chart (2005)	Peak position
US Top Christian Albums (Billboard)	20
US Heatseekers Albums (Billboard)	29
