= The Cradle (album) =

Studio album by Colour Revolt
- Released: 2010
- Genre: Indie rock
- Length: 43:41
- Label: Dualtone
- Producer: Hank Sullivant

Colour Revolt chronology
Plunder, Beg and Curse (2008)	The Cradle (2010)

Professional ratings
Review scores
Source	Rating
AbsolutePunk.net	(87%)
AllMusic	4/5 stars

The Cradle is the second full-length album from Oxford, Mississippi, indie-rock band, Colour Revolt. It is the band's first since drummer Len Clark, bassist Patrick Addison, and guitarist Jimmy Cajoleas left in 2008 and were replaced by drummer Daniel Davison, keyboardist Brooks Tipton, and bassist/producer Hank Sullivant. It is also their first for their new label Dualtone Records, who signed the band after they were dropped by Fat Possum in 2008. It was released on August 10, 2010 and has received the highest reviews out of the band's three releases thus far. The lyrics for much of the album deal with the hardships endured by the band after the lineup change and being dropped from their label, specifically in the first two songs, "8 Years," and "Our Names."

== Track listing ==
1. "8 Years" – 3:36
2. "Our Names" – 5:27
3. "Heartbeat" – 3:06
4. "The Cradle" – 3:05
5. "Everything is the Same" – 4:35
6. "She Don't Talk" – 4:42
7. "Each Works" – 3:58
8. "Mona Lisa" – 4:04
9. "Brought to Life" – 5:06
10. "Reno" – 6:02

iTunes bonus track

11. "Red Glow Forming" – 3:16

Deluxe edition

12. "8 Years" (Live at Paste) – 4:33
13. "Our Names" (KWUR Acoustic Session) – 5:42
14. "We Are Memories" (Demo) – 4:17
15. "The Cradle" (Live from Ardent Studios) – 3:21
16. "Moat" (Demo) – 5:30
17. "Open Up to Me" (Demo) – 2:19
18. "Brought to Life" (KWUR Acoustic Session) – 6:07
19. "She Don't Talk" (Demo) – 4:49
20. "Everything Is the Same" (Live from Ardent Studios) – 5:25

== Personnel ==
Band

- Jesse Coppenbarger – vocals, guitar, keys
- Sean Kirkpatrick – vocals, guitar
- Daniel Davison – drums, percussion
- Brooks Tipton – keys
- Hank Sullivant – bass guitar
- Louise Hviid – spoken word on "She Don't Talk"

Technical

- Alex Hornbake – engineering
- Hank Sullivant – producer
- Clay Jones – mixing
- John Golden – mastering

Artwork

- Matt Govaere – art direction, design
- Robert Lenz – art direction, design
- Joshua Burwell – interior illustrations
