= On Your Feet (Spoken album) =

Studio album by Spoken
- Released: September 22, 1997
- Genres: Christian rock, rapcore, alternative rock
- Label: Metro 1 Music
- Producer: Dan Garcia

Spoken chronology
On Your Feet (1997)	...What Remains (1999)

Professional ratings
Review scores
Source	Rating
Cross Rhythms	9/10
The Phantom Tollbooth	4/4

On Your Feet is the first album by the Christian rock band Spoken. Released in 1997 by Metro One, Inc., it possesses a musical style that was often compared to bands like Rage Against the Machine. It is a rap-rock fusion (also known as rapcore) with a highly spiritual message.

== Track listing ==
1. "On Your Feet" – 2:50
2. "Eyes of a Blind Man" – 3:18
3. "Stupid People" – 1:59
4. "Face the Son" – 3:05
5. "Through Your Veins" – 4:25
6. "Louder" – 2:25
7. "Let Go" – 3:55
8. "Out of His Head" – 1:31
9. "Pride in His Face" – 3:05
10. "The Way You Want Me to Be" – 3:27
11. "Another Day" – 3:16
12. "Fear in His Eyes" – 2:38
13. "Think for Yourself" – 22:21

== Notes ==
- A faux live song appears as a hidden track 18 minutes into "Think For Yourself".
- A re-recorded version "The Way You Want Me to Be" appears on the band's 2000 release, Echoes of the Spirit Still Dwell.
- In an interview with Indievisionmusic.com in February 2013, Matt Baird said there are no plans to re-release the first three albums again.
