= Plunder, Beg and Curse =

Studio album by Colour Revolt
- Released: 2008
- Genre: Indie rock
- Length: 47:29
- Label: Fat Possum
- Producer: Clay Jones

Colour Revolt chronology
Colour Revolt EP (2006)	Plunder, Beg and Curse (2008)	The Cradle (2010)

Professional ratings
Review scores
Source	Rating
AbsolutePunk.net	86%
AllMusic	2.5/5 stars

Plunder, Beg and Curse is Colour Revolt's first full-length release, as well as the last to feature bassist Patrick Addison, drummer Len Clark, and guitarist Jimmy "Catfish Boogaloo" Cajoleas in the lineup. The album was a commercial flop and the band was dropped from their label, Fat Possum, following the release. It was released April 1, 2008. Acoustic versions of "Naked and Red," "A Siren," and "Moses of the South," are present in the band's 2008 Daytrotter session.

== Track listing ==
1. "Naked and Red" – 3:48
2. "A Siren" – 3:57
3. "Elegant View" – 5:38
4. "See It" – 4:07
5. "Moses of the South" – 5:04
6. "Swamp" – 4:51
7. "Ageless Everytime" – 3:41
8. "Innocent and All" – 5:22
9. "Shovel to Ground" – 4:42
10. "What Will Come of Us?" – 6:19
