= Wrongdoers (album) =

Studio album by Norma Jean
- Released: August 6, 2013
- Recorded: 2012
- Studio: Covenant Studio in Kansas City, Missouri; Additional drums at The Link Venue in Blue Springs, Missouri
- Genre: Metalcore; hardcore punk; sludge metal
- Length: 49:23
- Label: Razor & Tie
- Producer: Josh Barber, Aaron Crawford, Norma Jean

Norma Jean chronology
Meridional (2010)	Wrongdoers (2013)	Polar Similar (2016)

Singles from Wrongdoers
- 1. "If You Got it at Five, You Got it at Fifty" Released: June 25, 2013

Wrongdoers is the sixth studio album by American metalcore band Norma Jean. The album was released on August 6, 2013, and is the band's second release through Razor & Tie. It is the first album to feature guitarist Jeff Hickey, bassist John Finnegan and drummer Clayton Holyoak, and the last album with longtime guitarist Chris Day. Wrongdoers garnered critical acclamation by music critics at such publications as Alternative Press, Decibel, Exclaim! and Revolver Magazine, and sold 8,340 copies in its first week.

== Writing and recording ==
Vocalist Cory Brandan said about the album "We also slapped some old school classic Norma Jean nastiness on it. We really struggled between wanting to have the fastest songs we've ever written to having the most groove driven songs, so the record is about half and half."

Brandan also stated that the band "felt it was best to push it back and make sure we didn't put out something that we were going to be less satisfied with," and that they had "experimented with strings, piano, organ, percussion and tons of live tracks that all will be present on this record."

Wrongdoers was produced by Josh Barber, while the mixing was done by Jeremy SH Griffith, the producer of the band's previous album Meridional.

== Pre-release & promotion ==
Wrongdoers was made available for pre-order in July 2013 with a few different packages available containing various assortments of band merchandise, paired with a CD or Vinyl version of the album. All pre-order packages included a free and instant download of the song "If You Got It at Five, You Got It at Fifty" off of the album.

"If You Got It at Five, You Got It at Fifty" was premiered on MetalSucks on July 24, 2013. MetalSucks wrote that "it's fast, it's grindy, it's metal, it's punk rock, it's everything you want Norma Jean to be." Metal injection's Greg Kennelty said the song was "way heavier than I thought it would be. Like, a lot heavier."

Norma Jean created a set of limited edition 3.5-inch vinyl records of the single "AHH! SHARK BITE AHH!" which were hand stamped and available as an add on with a pre-order of the album.

Norma Jean also released a series of documentary teasers about their progress on the album titled "The Making of Wrongdoers". The full documentary is available exclusively with an iTunes purchase of the album.

== Music ==
At Allmusic, Gregory Heaney said the album had various tempos and textures in the music. The likes of Decibel's Jeff Treppel stated it was very assertive from a musical standpoint, and Jason Schreurs of Alternative Press wrote that the music may have exceeded their former album in shear "heaviness, emotion, mood and pure adrenalin".

== Critical reception ==
Professional ratings
Aggregate scores
Source	Rating
Metacritic	85/100
Review scores
Source	Rating
About.com	4.5/5 stars
AbsolutePunk	80%
Allmusic	4/5 stars
Alternative Press	4.5/5 stars
Cross Rhythms	9/10 squares
Decibel	7/10
Exclaim!	9/10
HM	4/5 stars
Jesus Freak Hideout	5/5 stars 4/5 stars
Outburn	9/10
Punknews.org	4/5 stars
Revolver	3.5/5 stars
Rock Sound	9/10

Wrongdoers has garnered critical acclaim from music critics. At Metacritic, they assign a weighted average score to ratings and reviews from selected mainstream critics, which based upon eight reviews, the album has a Metascore of an 85. At About.com, Todd Lyons felt that the release "works within in the now industry-standard framework of 11 tracks to spread dark tender determination across the album." Gregory Heaney of Allmusic told that "fans will be happy to reap the rewards of their hard work and the perseverance of a band that still holds true to the spirit of metalcore." At HM, Dan MacIntosh wrote that "Make no mistake, though; there’s no weakness here. This album rings out with a simple warning: wrongdoers beware." Dan Slessor of Outburn noted how the album was "driven by frustration", but did call the release "an absolute monster of a record." At AbsolutePunk, Jake Jenkins stated that "Wrongdoers grabs you by the throat from the start, and when it finally releases its grip you can't help but go back for more."

At Alternative Press, Jason Schreurs proclaimed that "Wrongdoers is the band standing tall, fists in the air, screaming at the heavens." In addition, Schreurs stated that "since we already referred to Norma Jean's previous album, Meridional, as their 'first true masterpiece,' we have to call Wrongdoers their next masterpiece." Exclaim!'s Greg Pratt highlighted how the album contains "unlisted, sludge metal instrumental with crashing, crushing, demo-quality production only adds to the overall awesomeness and crazed attitude behind it all." At Decibel, Jeff Treppel criticized the album because he believed that "Wrongdoers breaks zero square meters of new ground, but it isn't really trying to", and wrote that he "give[s] [them] credit for having the ambition to attempt the 14-minute closer." Furthermore, Treppel noted that there is "nothing to be ashamed of" in noting that "it's still metalcore, but they have become an exemplary representative of their genre." Founder Tony Cummings at Cross Rhythms rated the album a nine out of a ten, stating that "If you enjoy music full of dissonant guitars, breakdowns and vocals which seem to be wrenched from the depths you'll find 'Wrongdoers' up there with the band's very best albums."

At Jesus Freak Hideout, Wayne Reimer told that he felt "a masterpiece behind me", but did find that the "long haul fans may not be too happy about this direction that The Almighty Norma Jean have taken as of late, but that does not decrease the skilful way they mixed together melody and bedlam, nor the emotion audible in every note, nor the dedication to dissimilarity from minute to minute." Also, Michael Weaver of Jesus Freak Hideout felt that the band has always made a concerted effort to evolve from the onset, that "Wrongdoers, is not an exception to this history." Sammi Chichester at Revolver felt that "the band isn't goofing around", and affirmed that "Wrongdoers may not be groundbreaking, but it's certainly up to snuff with Norma Jean's past output of breakdown-heavy and somewhat-chaotic metalcore." Furthermore, Chichester told that "Wrong has rarely sounded so right." At Rock Sound, Andrew Kelham said the release shows a "revitalized" band, who "can still get abrasive with the best of them".

== Track listing ==
All tracks are written by Norma Jean except for Nos. 4 and 10 co-written with Scottie Henry.

No.	Title	Length
1.	"Hive Minds"	6:44
2.	"If You Got It at Five, You Got It at Fifty"	2:17
3.	"Wrongdoers"	4:49
4.	""The Potter Has No Hands""	3:16
5.	"Sword in Mouth, Fire Eyes"	4:25
6.	"Afterhour Animals"	0:50
7.	"The Lash Whistled Like a Singing Wind"	1:07
8.	"Neck in the Hemp"	3:10
9.	"Triffids"	3:33
10.	"Funeral Singer"	5:01
11.	"Sun Dies, Blood Moon"	14:11
Total length:		49:23

Pre-order Bonus Track
No.	Title	Length
12.	"Family Bike Wreck"	1:15

== Personnel ==
Norma Jean

- Cory Brandan – vocals, guitars
- Chris Day – guitars
- Jeff Hickey – guitars
- Clayton Holyoak – drums
- John Finnegan – bass

Production and recording

- Josh Barber – producer, engineer.
- Aaron Crawford – co-producer, engineer.
- Jeremy SH Griffith – mix engineer - at Singing Serpent Studios NYC.
- Drew Lavyne – mastering engineer - at A.L.L. Digital Mastering.
- Additional drums recorded @ The Link Venue, Blue Springs, Missouri

Additional musicians

- Patrick Bellah and Baron Lyle – cello and violin on "Sun Dies, Blood Moon".
- Adam Putman – background vocals on "Sword in Mouth, Fire Eyes". Keyboards, organ and bow cymbal on "Sun Dies, Blood Moon" and "Hive Minds".
- Aaron Crawford – second drums on "Hive Minds".
- Wolf Kindler – guest vocals on "If You Got It at Five, You Got It at Fifty".
- Scottie Henry – lyric contributions on "Funeral Singer" and ""The Potter Has No Hands"".
- Daniel Holyoak – keyboards and other random noises on "Hive Minds".
- Sean Ingram – additional vocals on "The Lash Whistled Like a Singing Wind".

== Chart performance ==
Chart (2013)	Peak position
US Billboard 200	37
US Top Christian Albums (Billboard)	1
US Top Hard Rock Albums (Billboard)	3
US Independent Albums (Billboard)	8
US Top Rock Albums (Billboard)	7
