= O' God, the Aftermath =

Studio album by Norma Jean
- Released: March 1, 2005
- Genres: Metalcore, mathcore
- Length: 47:51
- Labels: Solid State, Abacus, EMI
- Producers: Matt Bayles, Norma Jean

Norma Jean chronology
| Bless the Martyr and Kiss the Child (2002) | O' God, the Aftermath (2005) | Redeemer (2006) |

Professional ratings
Review scores
| Source | Rating |
|---|---|
| AbsolutePunk.net | (75%) |
| AllMusic | 3.5/5 stars |
| Cross Rhythms | 7/10 stars |
| Exclaim! | Highly favorable |
| Jesus Freak Hideout | 3.5/5 stars |
| Punknews.org | 2.5/5 stars |

Deluxe Edition
Review scores
| Source | Rating |
|---|---|
| Cross Rhythms | 8/10 stars |

O' God, the Aftermath is the second studio album by American metalcore band Norma Jean and was released on March 1, 2005. Like their previous album Bless the Martyr and Kiss the Child, O God, the Aftermath was released on Solid State Records. This is the first album with vocalist Cory Brandan.

== Background ==
The album was re-released on March 21, 2006, as a CD/DVD with expanded Grammy-nominated artwork, two hours of extra footage, and "ShaunLuu" as bonus track which was also featured on the Masters of Horror soundtrack. This track was originally set to be 7 minutes long, but had to be cut short for the soundtrack. On the re-release, on a CD player, if rewind is held down until the display reads -2:20, there is a hidden instrumental song.

Music videos were filmed for the songs "Bayonetwork: Vultures in Vivid Color", "Liarsenic: Creating a Universe of Discourse" and "Absentimental: Street Clam".

The track "Pretendeavor: In Reference to a Sinking Ship" was previously released on a Solid State Records sampler called This Is Solid State: Vol. 5 under the name "In Reference to a Sinking Ship", and was the first recorded output with new vocalist Cory Brandan. It was re-recorded with new parts and riffs for the album.

The song "Absentimental: Street Clam" was previously known as "Manipulateral: Street Clam".

In the liner notes of the original release of the album the full title of the album is listed as "O'God, The Aftermath: The Marvelous End of the Exhausted Contender".

All song titles are portmanteaux.

The words featured on the cover of the CD are the lyrics to the song "Coffinspire: Multitude, Multitudes in the Valley of Decision", which is from Joel 3:13 - 16.

== Track listing ==
All lyrics are written by Cory Brandan; all music is composed by Norma Jean.

| No. | Title | Length |
|---|---|---|
| 0. | "Hidden Instrumental Track" | 2:20 |
| 1. | "Murderotica: An Avalanche in D Minor" | 1:58 |
| 2. | "Vertebraille: Choke That Thief Called Dependence" | 3:12 |
| 3. | "Bayonetwork: Vultures in Vivid Color" | 3:29 |
| 4. | "Dilemmachine: Coalition, Hoax" | 2:12 |
| 5. | "Coffinspire: Multitudes, Multitudes in the Valley of Decision!" | 4:25 |
| 6. | "Liarsenic: Creating a Universe of Discourse" | 4:08 |
| 7. | "Disconnecktie: The Faithful Vampire" | 10:02 |
| 8. | "Absentimental: Street Clam" | 3:12 |
| 9. | "Charactarantula: Talking to You and the Intake of Glass" | 4:17 |
| 10. | "Pretendeavor: In Reference to a Sinking Ship" | 4:27 |
| 11. | "Scientifiction: I. A Clot of Tragedy/II. A Swarm of Dedication" | 6:22 |
| Total length: | | 47:51 |

Re-release bonus track
| No. | Title | Length |
|---|---|---|
| 12. | "ShaunLuu" (Track 5 on CD and track 12 on vinyl) | 3:43 |

Abacus Recordings bonus video enhancement
| No. | Title | Length |
|---|---|---|
| 1. | "Bayonetwork: Vultures in Vivid Color" (music video) | 3:32 |
| 2. | "Absentimental: Street Clam" (music video) | 3:13 |

== Awards ==
In 2006, the album was nominated for a Dove Award for Recorded Music Packaging of the Year at the 37th GMA Dove Awards. In the same year, the album was nominated for a Grammy Award for Best Recording Package at the 48th Annual Grammy Awards.

== Personnel ==
Norma Jean

- Cory Brandan – vocals, guitars
- Scottie H. Henry – guitars
- Chris John Day – guitars
- Jake Schultz – bass
- Daniel Davison – drums

Additional personnel

- Justin Armstrong – mixing assistant, sampling
- Matt Bayles – engineer, mixing, producer
- John Daley – management
- Jeff Gros – photography
- Alex Rose – assistant
- Tim Smith – management
- Howie Weinberg – mastering
- Asterik Studio – art direction, design
