= Colour Revolt =

American rock band

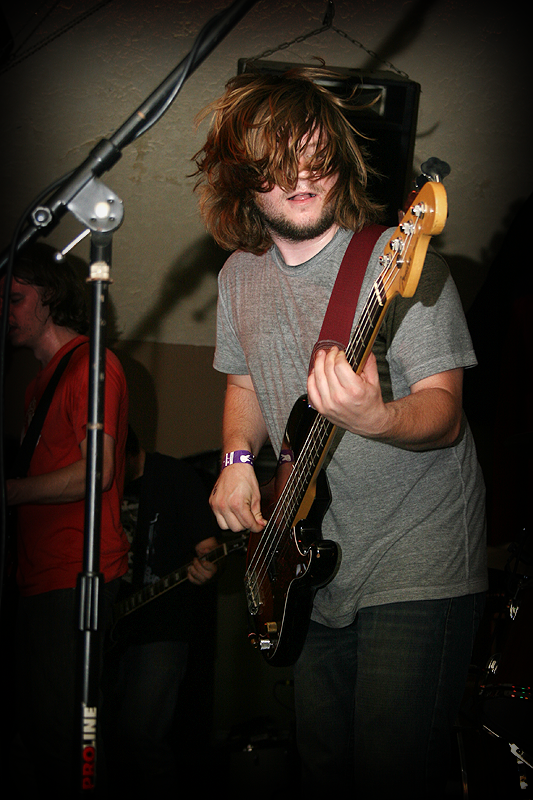

Background information
- Origin: Oxford, Mississippi
- Genres: Indie rock, alternative rock
- Labels: Tiny Evil; Interscope; Fat Possum; Dualtone
- Members: Jesse Coppenbarger; Sean Kirkpatrick; Luke White; Brooks Tipton; Patrick Ryan
- Past members: Drew Mellon; Patrick Addison; Len Clark; Jimmy Cajoleas
- Website: colourrevolt.net

Colour Revolt is an American rock band from Oxford, Mississippi.

== History ==
Colour Revolt's members first played together while they were high school students at Jackson Academy in Jackson, MS under the name Foxxe, then changing to Fletcher and releasing an album entitled Friends Don't Speak. They then moved on to become college students at the University of Mississippi in Oxford, Mississippi. They took their current name from Edwin Abbott's mathematical novel, Flatland. The group had intended to record their first EP in Mississippi in August 2005, but Hurricane Katrina interrupted the recording session, and so they recorded it in the house of local label Esperanza Plantation's owner, Chaney Nichols. The self-titled EP came out in December 2005; following this the group toured with Brand New and signed to Interscope Records, who re-released the EP on their subsidiary Tiny Evil in October 2006.

The group has also performed at SXSW and toured with Dinosaur Jr., Black Lips, Okkervil River, Brand New, Menomena, Paper Rival, Explosions in the Sky, Malajube, Anathallo, and Manchester Orchestra. They then signed with Fat Possum Records; their full-length debut, Plunder, Beg and Curse, produced by Clay Jones, was released on April 1, 2008. In 2008, Boston newspaper The Phoenix named them the Best New Band from Mississippi. In 2009, Jesse Coppenbarger released a solo full-length album under the moniker El Obo.

More recently, Cajeolas, Clark and Addison left the band for personal reasons and the band was dropped from Tiny Evil. They were replaced by Daniel Davison, formerly of Norma Jean, on drums, Brooks Tipton on keyboards, and Hank Sullivant, formerly of The Whigs, on bass. The band was signed to Dualtone Records. 2010 saw the release of their second album, The Cradle. Davison and Sullivant were replaced by Patrick Ryan and Luke White for their summer tour.

Coppenbarger has recorded a new solo album as El Obo, titled Reach Into the Dark and Pull it Closer, which was released June 12, 2020. The album includes production by Andy Hull of Manchester Orchestra and was released by Favorite Gentlemen Recordings, Hull's personal label.

== Members ==
Current

- Jesse Coppenbarger - vocals, guitar, keyboard
- Sean Kirkpatrick - vocals, guitar, keyboards
- Brooks Tipton- keyboards
- Patrick Ryan- drums
- Luke White- bass

Former

- Baskin Jones - bass
- Drew Mellon - bass
- Patrick Addison - bass
- Jimmy Cajoleas - guitar
- Len Clark - drums, vocals
- Wes Lawrence - bass

Session & Touring

- Daniel Davison - drums

== Discography ==
Fletcher

- Andy's Greatest Hits (2001)
- Friends Don't Speak (Esperanza Plantation, 2003)

Colour Revolt

- Makeshift EP (2005)
- Colour Revolt EP (Esperanza Plantation, 2005; re-released Tiny Evil, 2006)
- Plunder, Beg and Curse (Fat Possum, 2008)
- Daytrotter Sessions EP (2008)
- The Cradle (Dualtone Records, 2010)
- Daytrotter Sessions EP (2012)
