= Colour Revolt (EP) =

Colour Revolt EP

EP by Colour Revolt
- Released: August 2008
- Genre: Alternative rock, indie rock, noise rock
- Length: 25:45
- Label: Tiny Evil
- Producer: Steven Bevilaqua

Colour Revolt chronology
Makeshift EP (2005)	Colour Revolt EP (2008)	Plunder, Beg and Curse (2008)

Professional ratings
Review scores
Source	Rating
AllMusic	3.5/5 stars

Colour Revolt EP is the first release from the band Colour Revolt, released by Esperanza Plantation in 2005, then re-released by Tiny Evil in 2006. The EP was recorded by Steven Bevilaqua at The Train Station and at "Chaney and Leah's house." Mixing was done by Clay Jones at Pete's Room. Mastering by Rodney Mills' Masterhouse.

== Track listing ==
1. "Blood in Your Mouth" – 5:44
2. "Mattresses Underwater" – 5:01
3. "A New Family" – 3:23
4. "Our Homes Are Graves" – 2:25
5. "Change Your Face or Change Your Name" – 5:12
6. "Circus" – 4:00

2012 Vinyl Reissue Bonus Tracks
No.	Title	Length
7.	"Mattresses Underwater" (Makeshift EP Version)	4:56
8.	"Our Homes Are Graves" (Makeshift EP Version)	2:24
9.	"Paris" (Makeshift EP)	4:38
10.	"A New Family" (Maverick's VIN DZL Remix)	4:39

== Personnel ==
Band

- Jimmy Cajoleas - guitar
- Len Clark - drums, vocals
- Jesse Coppenbarger - vocals, guitar, piano, organ, harmonica, vibraphone
- Sean Kirkpatrick - guitar, vocals, piano
- Drew Mellon - bass guitar, synthesizer

Artwork

- Jonathon Blackwell - art direction, concept, layout, design.
- Len Clark - art direction, concept
- Jesse Coppenbarger - art direction, concept
- Steven Bevilaqua - art direction, concept
- Chaney Nichols - art direction, concept
- Leah Nichols - art direction, concept
