= The Anti Mother =

Studio album by Norma Jean
- Released: August 5, 2008
- Recorded: April 1 – June 15, 2008
- Studios: Ross Robinson's Home Studio, Venice Beach, California
- Genres: Metalcore; post-hardcore
- Length: 44:40
- Labels: Solid State, Stomp
- Producer: Ross Robinson

Norma Jean chronology
Redeemer (2006)	The Anti Mother (2008)	Meridional (2010)

Professional ratings
Review scores
Source	Rating
AbsolutePunk	(75%)
AllMusic	3.5/5 stars
Alt Press	4/5 stars
Artistdirect	4.5/5 stars
CCM Magazine	Highly favorable
Cross Rhythms	9/10 stars
The Fish	Favorable
Jesus Freak Hideout	Sean Lex: Scott Fryberger:
Kerrang!	3/5 stars
Punknews.org	3.5/5 stars

The Anti Mother (sometimes referred to as Norma Jean vs. The Anti Mother) is the fourth studio album by American metalcore band Norma Jean. It is the first release to feature new drummer Chris Raines, making Chris Day and Scottie Henry the only members of the band to have appeared on all albums released by Norma Jean up to that point.

== Album information ==
Norma Jean added several guest musicians to The Anti Mother, including Page Hamilton of Helmet, Chino Moreno of Deftones and Cove Reber of Saosin, they have also stated that, "We are not just doing "guest vocal" spots for them either... every band does that... we are going to write songs with them". The album was also produced by Ross Robinson, who had previously produced Norma Jean's 2006 album Redeemer.

Lead singer Cory Brandan commented on the new album and the meaning of the title:

The Anti Mother is a character we created which represents anything that is deceptive, and yet possesses an outwardly beautiful nature. This record is the most melodic album we’ve ever created, but it’s definitely the heaviest record Norma Jean has done as well--and furious at that.

— Cory Brandan,

A music video was made for the song "Robots: 3, Humans: 0" which has been featured on MTV2's Headbangers Ball. It features the group performing in a room of flying debris and follows the supernatural adventure of a young couple.

== Track listing ==
All tracks are written by Norma Jean, with additional writers noted.

No.	Title	Writer(s)	Vocals	Length
1.	"Vipers, Snakes, and Actors"		Cory Brandan	4:13
2.	"Self Employed Chemist"		Brandan	3:13
3.	"Birth of the Anti Mother"		Brandan, Holly Rae, Camille Driscoll	2:48
4.	"Robots: 3, Humans: 0"		Brandan, Chino Moreno, Cove Reber	4:31
5.	"Death of the Anti Mother"		Brandan	4:06
6.	"Surrender Your Sons..."	Moreno, Reber	Brandan, Moreno, Reber	4:40
7.	"Murphy Was an Optimist"		Brandan, Moreno, Reber	4:18
8.	"Opposite of Left and Wrong"	Hamilton	Brandan, Page Hamilton	3:14
9.	"...Discipline Your Daughters"		Brandan	4:16
10.	"And There Will Be a Swarm of Hornets"		Brandan, Reber, Rae, Driscoll, Lainee Gram, Ali Pantera Abrishami	9:21
Total length:				44:40

== Personnel ==
Norma Jean

- Cory Brandan – lead vocals, guitars
- Scottie Henry – guitars
- Jake Schultz – bass
- Chris Day – guitars
- Chris Raines – drums, percussion

Guest personnel

- Chino Moreno – writing, guitars, vocals (track 4, 6, 7)
- Page Hamilton – guitars, vocals (track 8)
- Cove Reber – writing, vocals (tracks 4, 6, 7, 10)
- Holly Rae – vocals (tracks 3, 10)
- Camille Driscoll – vocals (tracks 3, 10)
- Lainee Gram – vocals (track 10)
- Ali Pantera Abrishami – vocals (track 10)

Production

- Produced by Ross Robinson
- Mixed by Ryan Boesch and Ross Robinson
- Engineered by Ryan Boesch
- Mastered by T-Roy

Art

- Art Direction by Steve Hash and Norma Jean
- Design by Steve Hash
- Photography by Ralf Strathmann
