= Travail (band) =

American metal band

- Origin: Dallas/Fort Worth, Texas
- Genres: Christian metal; Christian hardcore; metalcore; alternative metal; nu metal
- Years active: 1996–2001
- Labels: Pluto Records, Metro One
- Past members: Matt Leslie; Brian Hoover; Duane Smith; Daniel McKay; Aaron Wiese; Tim Bowman; Kyle Magnon; Cliff Wright

Travail was an American, Christian nu metal/metalcore band based in the Dallas/Fort Worth area in Texas. Fronted by Matt Leslie, it had an intense following at Club 412, a local church-sponsored lounge and music venue located in southwest Fort Worth.

Stylistic comparisons were often drawn between their sound and that of secular rock acts popular at the time such as Korn and Limp Bizkit. The band was signed on Pluto Records and then were picked up by national label Metro One. After releasing their second album, Beautiful Loneliness, on the Metro One label, Travail received a nomination for the 2001 Dove Awards in the Hard Music Recorded Song category. Before touring much under the new label, however, Travail broke up. Their most requested song, "Judge Me" is still a very popular song and the video for "Return" is still a popular video among those who enjoy the rapcore/nu metal genre. Guitarist Aaron Wiese later joined the band Spoken, but left in 2008.

Members Matt Leslie, Brian Hoover, Daniel McKay, and Duane Smith have started a new band with Travis Knight as their second guitarist. The new band is Southern Train Gypsy. Although not a band anymore, Matthew Leslie has retired from music, and the other members have formed a new band as of 2018.

== Members ==
Current

- Matt Leslie - vocals (1996-2001)
- Brian Hoover - guitar
- Duane Smith - bass
- Daniel McKay - drums (1996-2001)

Former

- Kyle Magnon - guitar
- Tim Bowman - guitar
- Aaron Weise - guitar
- Cliff Wright - bass

== Discography ==
- 1998: Anchor of my Soul (Independent)
- 1999: Travail + Luti-Kriss (EP, Pluto Records, Review: HM Magazine)
- 1999: Travail (Pluto Records, Review: The Phantom Tollbooth)
- 2000: Beautiful Loneliness (Metro One, Reviews: The Phantom Tollbooth, Cross Rhythms)
