= Norma Jean (band) =

American metalcore band

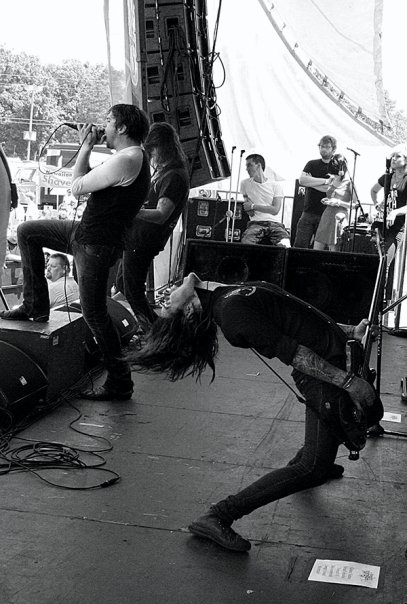
- Norma Jean in 2008

Background information
- Also known as: Luti-Kriss (1997–2001)
- Origin: Douglasville, Georgia, U.S.
- Genres: Metalcore; post-hardcore; noise rock; sludge metal; mathcore
- Years active: 1997–present
- Labels: Tooth & Nail; Solid State; Razor & Tie
- Spinoffs: The Chariot, Holy+Gold, Hundred Suns
- Members: Cory Brandan; Matt Marquez; Jeff Hickey; Phillip Farris; Grayson Stewart; Clay Crenshaw
- Past members: Josh Scogin; Scottie Henry; Chris Day; Josh Swofford; Daniel Davison; Mick Bailey; Josh Doolittle; Jake Schultz; Chris Raines; Clayton Holyoak; John Finnegan; Michael Palmquist
- Website: normajeannoise.com

Norma Jean (originally known as Luti-Kriss) is an American metalcore band from Douglasville, Georgia, a suburb of Atlanta. Formed in 1997, the band has evolved through various lineup changes, resulting in no original members remaining. To date, Norma Jean has released nine studio albums and received a Grammy Award nomination in 2006 for Best Recording Package for their second album O' God, the Aftermath. The band's name is derived from the real name of actress Marilyn Monroe. The idea being that the band was forced to change their name from Luti-Kriss, much like Monroe herself was "forced."

== History ==
=== Luti-Kriss and debut album (1997–2004) ===
Norma Jean formed in 1997 under the name Luti-Kriss with Josh Scogin on vocals, guitarists Scottie Henry and Chris Day, Josh Swofford on bass, Mick Bailey on turntables, and Daniel Davison on drums. The band recorded a split EP with Travail that was released in 1999 through Pluto Records. Luti-Kriss's songs from the split would later be released on 5ep, which was released on July 25, 2000, through Pluto Records. The sound of theses EPs differed greatly from future releases, featuring an aggressive nu metal style. Shortly after the release of 5ep, Swofford would leave the band and be replaced by Josh Doolittle. The band then would start working on the debut album Throwing Myself, with Bailey leaving during the album's production. The album featured the nu metal elements of the previous EP's, but with a newly acquired metalcore/hardcore sound added as well that the band would soon pursue fully on following albums.

Evolving from Luti-Kriss, the original Norma Jean lineup consisted of the final Luti-Kriss lineup, utilizing additional percussion on recordings instead of turntables. Drummer Daniel Davison, explained that the band got their name from actress Marilyn Monroe, whose real name is Norma Jeane Baker. It was not until after they decided upon that name that they "were looking at a book" which apparently claimed that "Norma" means "pattern", and "Jean" means "God's grace and mercy", combined into "Patterns of grace and mercy". In 2002, the band released Bless the Martyr and Kiss the Child on Solid State Records. Their original vocalist, Josh Scogin, left the band shortly after the release of Bless the Martyr and Kiss the Child. Scogin stated "It was just something that I felt led to do." Scogin has been known to join in with Norma Jean during live performances to sing "Memphis Will Be Laid To Waste" since his departure. Original bassist Joshua Doolittle also left the band around the same time as Scogin. Doolittle was replaced by Jake Schultz. Scogin left the band and later went on to start the Chariot; he was replaced by Brad Norris for about a year and nine months.

=== Early releases (2005–2009) ===
Brad Norris was later replaced by Cory Brandan, formerly of the bands Eso-Charis, Living Sacrifice and Uses Fire. In March 2005, they released their second album, titled O God, the Aftermath. It was Putman's first album performance for Norma Jean. The artwork for the band's second album, O God, the Aftermath was nominated for Best Recording Package at the Grammy Awards of 2006. The artwork was designed by Asterisk studios in Seattle, Washington.

Redeemer, their third album, was recorded with producer Ross Robinson. On September 21, 2007, drummer Daniel Davison announced that he would be leaving the band after their current tour ended, via the band's official website. His last show was on November 7, 2007, at Irving Plaza in New York, NY.

On December 17, 2007, Norma Jean announced that they would start writing for their new album, The Anti Mother, in January, record in April, and will be playing the entire 2008 Warped Tour. Writing was officially announced on January 24. On February 13, Norma Jean announced in a Myspace bulletin that they were "about 6 songs deep." They wrote a song with Page Hamilton of Helmet, and collaborated with Deftones' frontman, Chino Moreno. The band described the two songs they wrote with Moreno as diverse and anti-traditional. In early-to-mid February, they announced that their replacement drummer would be Chris Raines, who is also the drummer for the band, Spitfire.

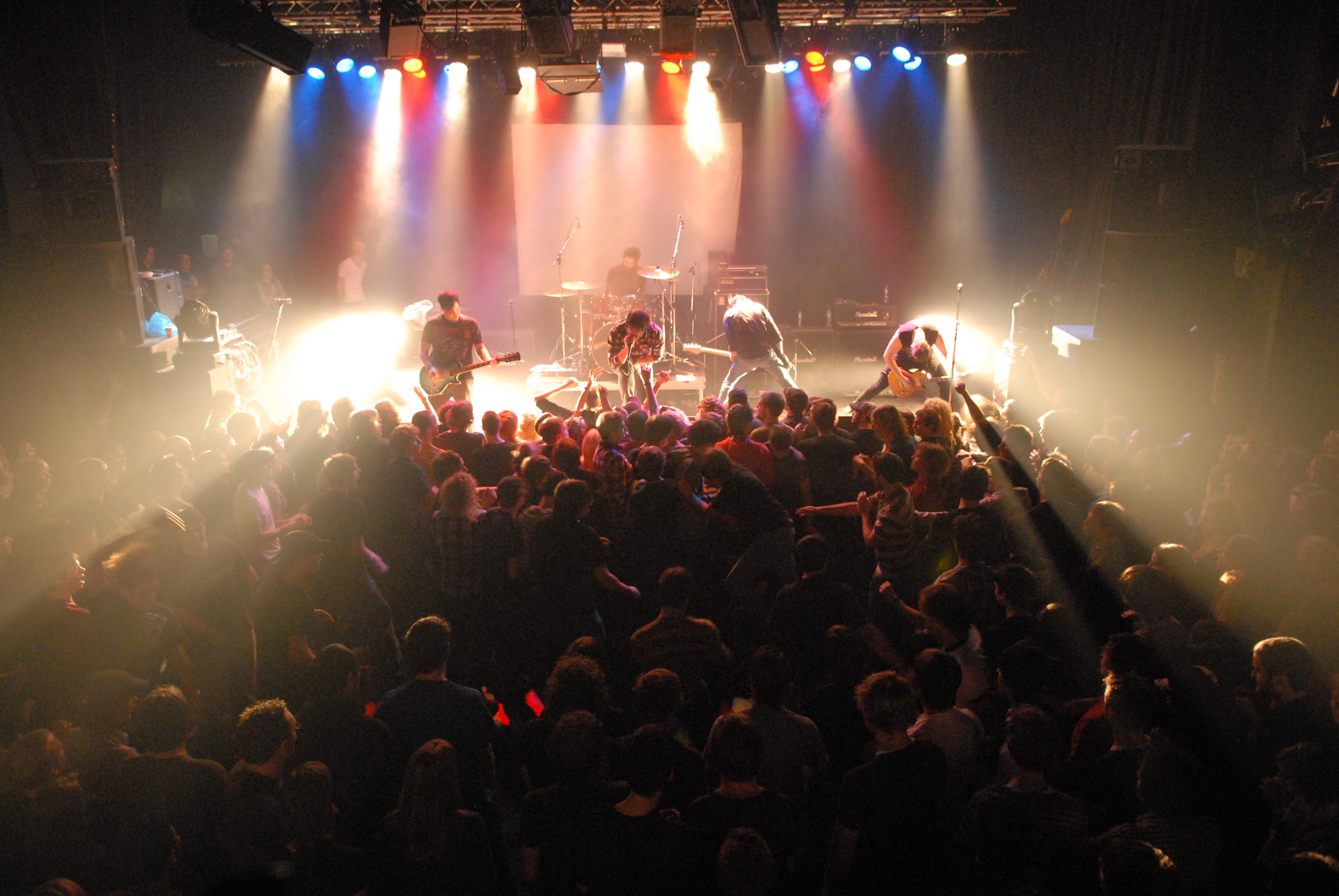
Norma Jean performing at the Tivoli in the Netherlands in 2007.

On August 5, 2008, Norma Jean released The Anti Mother. Prior to leaving for their headlining tour, Norma Jean shot a music video for "Robots 3 Humans 0", with music video director Daniel Chesnut.

On January 3, 2009, Norma Jean announced on their official website that they would be writing songs for their next album. The band's upcoming fifth studio album was said to be a return "back to [their] roots."

On April 5, 2009, Norma Jean announced on their website that they had dropped off their current tour due to a myriad of reasons.

=== Signing to Razor & Tie (2009–2015) ===
On November 3, 2009, Norma Jean announced that they would be parting ways with longtime label Solid State and signing a deal with independent label Razor & Tie with plans to release an album in the summer of 2010.

Norma Jean announced that a title for one of their new songs will be "Kill More Presidents" and have encouraged fans to film the live performance of this song. The video was released in early March.

Fans could download the first track, titled "Leaderless and Self Enlisted" from "Meridional" by signing up for the band's email list via the band's website.

Norma Jean released their Jeremy Griffith produced album, Meridional, on July 13, 2010.

In an interview with Exclaim! Magazine that was published the day of the Meridional album release, drummer Chris Raines spoke of how the sound of Meridional came to be and what influenced it." The last few records have been doing different things; this one truthfully mixed a lot of those records with what we wanted to do this time. I think we took all the good that we liked from the past records and added the new touch that we wanted to put on it, which was a heavier and darker theme."

Drummer Chris Raines was replaced by Matt Marquez in late 2010 with no formal announcement made for this exchange or if Raines would ever return. In 2016, Raines addressed leaving the band in an interview with Trav Turner (formerly of Aletheian, UnTeachers, Solamors) that it was mainly family issues. On November 23, 2010, Norma Jean's former record label Solid State Records released a retrospective box set collection titled Birds and Microscopes and Bottles of Elixirs and Raw Steak and a Bunch of Songs. The three CD compilation contains the band's first three studio albums (Bless the Martyr and Kiss the Child, Redeemer and O God, the Aftermath). In January 2011, founding guitarist Scottie Henry decided to take a temporary break from Norma Jean. He would later be replaced by Jeff Hickey, formerly of the Handshake Murders, for 2011 tour dates.

On October 30, 2012, the band announced that they would be going into the studio from December 2012 to January 2013, with Joshua Barber as the chosen producer. It is the first album by the band to feature new members Jeff Hickey on guitar, John Finnegan on bass, and Clayton Holyoak (formerly of Fear Before) on drums. Wrongdoers was released in the US on August 6, 2013, by Razor & Tie, with UK/EU to follow on September 9.

=== Re-signing with Solid State (2015–present) ===
In May 2015, they revealed work has begun for their seventh full-length album.

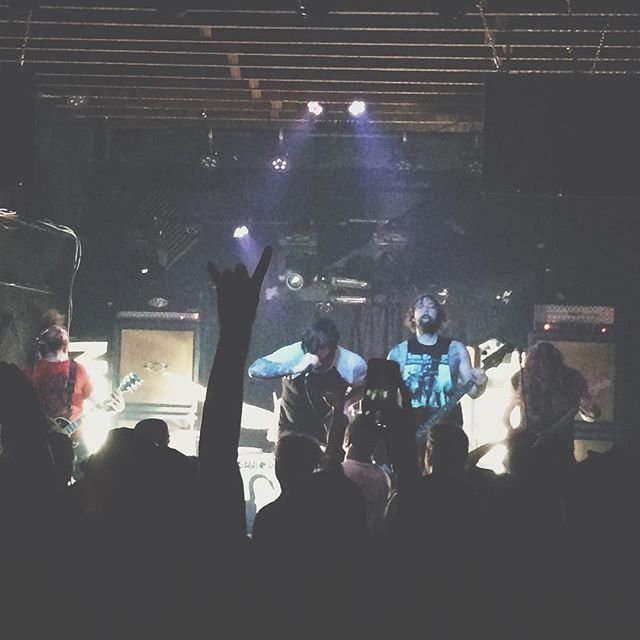
Norma Jean in Jacksonville, Florida, on September 22, 2015, for the O God, the Aftermath 10th Anniversary.

On July 9, 2015, Norma Jean announced the 10th anniversary of O God, The Aftermath North American Tour. They would perform the album in its entirety. The band later announced Sleepwave, '68, and the Ongoing Concept would join them.

On September 15, 2015, they announced they re-signed with Solid State Records, who will release their next album in 2016.

In June 2016, the band announced they had released the first single, "1,000,000 Watts", off the new album, Polar Similar. They released "Synthetic Sun" later that month. On August 11, 2016, Norma Jean released their third single off of Polar Similar, which is titled "Forever Hurtling Towards Andromeda", which features Sean Ingram of Coalesce. Before the release of the album, Putman did an interview with HM Magazine, in which they mentioned their newest member, Rhythm Guitarist Phillip Farris, who replaced Chris Day, the last remaining original member, though no statement was made of his departure. On September 28, 2017, Clayton Holyoak announced that he would be leaving to drum for Every Time I Die. John Finnegan has announced parting ways with Norma Jean.

On January 12, 2019, the band released the single "Children of the Dead" for streaming, with the song being a b-side from the Polar Similar sessions that originally appeared on the deluxe vinyl edition of the album. A music video for the song was released on January 15 via Solid State's official YouTube channel. On May 25, 2019, Norma Jean announced that they had parted ways with longtime guitarist Jeff Hickey.

Norma Jean released their eighth album, All Hail on October 25, 2019.

On June 6, 2022, Norma Jean announced their ninth album, Deathrattle Sing for Me, to be released August 12, 2022. The album's first single, "Call for the Blood", was released as a music video on June 16.

Cory Brandan, Michael Palmquist, and Matt Marquez helped write, produce and perform on Project 86's two part album OMNI, with Marquez on drums and Palmquist on guitar for the album and Brandan featured on the song "Skinjob".

== Touring ==
They played at 2006's Ozzfest with Ozzy Osbourne, Disturbed, Avenged Sevenfold, Hatebreed, DragonForce, System of a Down, Lacuna Coil, Black Label Society, Atreyu, Unearth, Bleeding Through, A Life Once Lost, the Red Chord, Walls of Jericho, Strapping Young Lad, All That Remains, Full Blown Chaos, Between the Buried and Me and Bad Acid Trip.

In late 2006, they headlined the Radio Rebellion Tour with support from Between the Buried and Me, Fear Before, Misery Signals and the Fully Down. They played the entire Warped Tour in mid-2008.

On October 3, 2008, Norma Jean embarked on a U.S. headlining tour called "The Anti-Mother Tour". The tour lasted until November 15, 2008, and featured several other bands on Solid State / Tooth & Nail Records including Haste the Day, the Showdown, MyChildren MyBride, Children 18:3, and Oh, Sleeper. Children 18:3 only appeared on half of the tour dates (October 3–26) while Oh, Sleeper filled in throughout the rest of the tour (October 28 – November 15).

On Thursday, September 17, 2009, Norma Jean announced they would enter a headlining tour spanning over November and December with Horse the Band, the Chariot, and Arsonists Get All the Girls. They also announced that in select cities, they would exclusively play their first album, Bless the Martyr & Kiss the Child, in its entirety. During the tour, the band played a song titled "Kill More Presidents", a B-side from their 2010 release, Meridional.

Norma Jean was on the 2010 Mayhem Festival on the Mayhem Festival side-stage along with Atreyu, In This Moment, and 3 Inches of Blood. Other festival participants include: Korn, Rob Zombie, Lamb of God, Five Finger Death Punch, Hatebreed, Chimaira, Shadows Fall, and Winds of Plague.

From the September 30, 2010, Norma Jean supported Architects on their UK headline tour. Further support came from UK metallers Devil Sold His Soul. In December 2010 Norma Jean supported Alexisonfire, with drummer Matt Marquez filling in.

In February/March 2011, Norma Jean headlined the "Explosions II Tour" with After the Burial, For the Fallen Dreams, Motionless in White and Stray from the Path.

On April 26, 2013, it was announced that Norma Jean would support the Dillinger Escape Plan on The Summer Slaughter Tour, along with Animals As Leaders, Periphery, Cattle Decapitation, the Ocean, Revocation, Aeon, Rings of Saturn, and Thy Art Is Murder.

On December 12, 2016, Periphery announced that Norma Jean, the Contortionist and Infinity Shred would join them on the "Sonic Unrest Tour II" from March 31 to April 22, 2017.

During the spring of 2018, they did an anniversary tour of the Redeemer album. The 24 show tour featured Gideon, Toothgrinder, and Greyhaven.

In early 2023, Norma Jean embarked on a US headline tour with Fire from the Gods, and Greyhaven.

Norma Jean played at the 2023 Furnace Fest, which included reformed bands such as Training for Utopia, Becoming the Archetype and Extol.

In February 2024, it was announced that Norma Jean would be touring with P.O.D. for the latter's I Got That tour along with Bad Wolves and Blind Channel.

== Musical style ==
Norma Jean has been primarily classified as a metalcore, mathcore, and post-hardcore band, comparable to bands Coalesce, Botch, and Converge. Additionally, the band's style and sound has been described as containing elements of sludge metal, post-metal, noise rock, alternative metal and math rock. Their early material as Luti-Kriss is considered nu metal.

=== Christianity ===
Many have taken Norma Jean to be a Christian band due to Cory Brandan's faith and brief membership in the Christian metal band Living Sacrifice and their history of touring with bands such as Spoken and Demon Hunter. In an interview in 2015, Brandan said, "I can't say that we're a full-on Christian band. I'm a Christian. I can speak for myself, but that's all I can speak for. I will say that I personally prefer not to play Christian festivals, but at the end of the day, it's a choice between playing a show and having a day off. I'd prefer to play a show, no matter where it is. We don't care if we play Christian festivals, but we don't want to alienate any of our fans. We don't want to play a show that would make our non-Christian fans uncomfortable enough to not come along, because we care about them too. I mean, they buy our records and merch just like the religious ones do. Probably even more so! I'd even take this one step further and suggest that the label of 'Christian music' is stupid - music can't have a belief. If I clap my hand, you can't listen to clap and say 'that clap is Christian, or Hindu, or Atheist.' or whatever. It's a freaking sound. The music itself can't have a theological belief. We're musicians first. The content is secondary to that. We write stuff that anyone can relate to. We don't write anything that will alienate anybody. Well, intentionally, anyway."

== Members ==
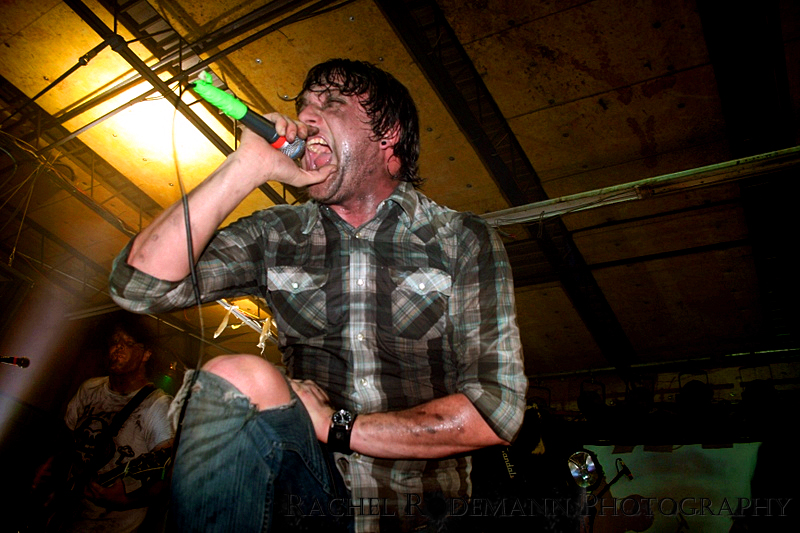
Vocalist Cory Brandan live in 2007

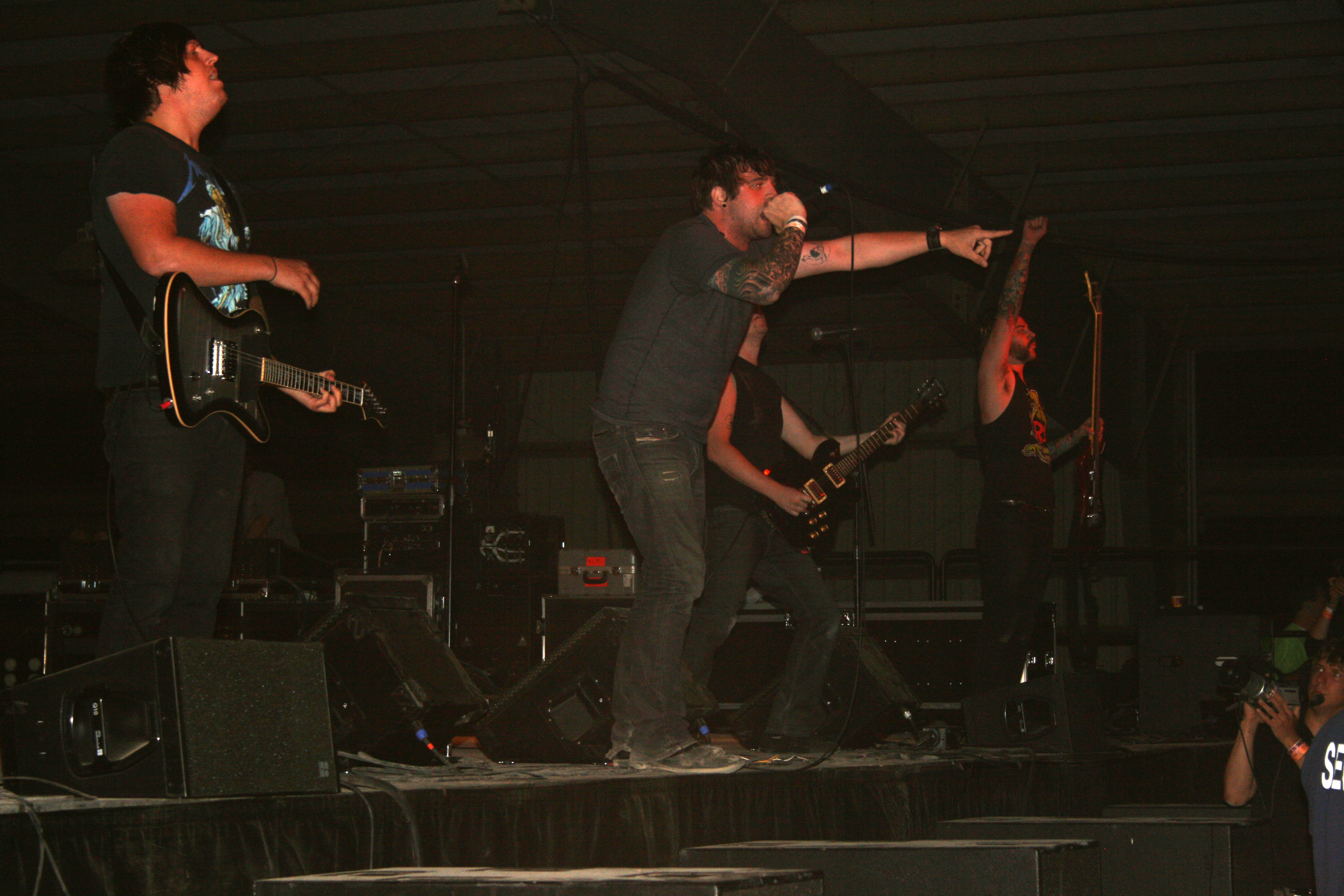
Norma Jean at Lifefest in 2009

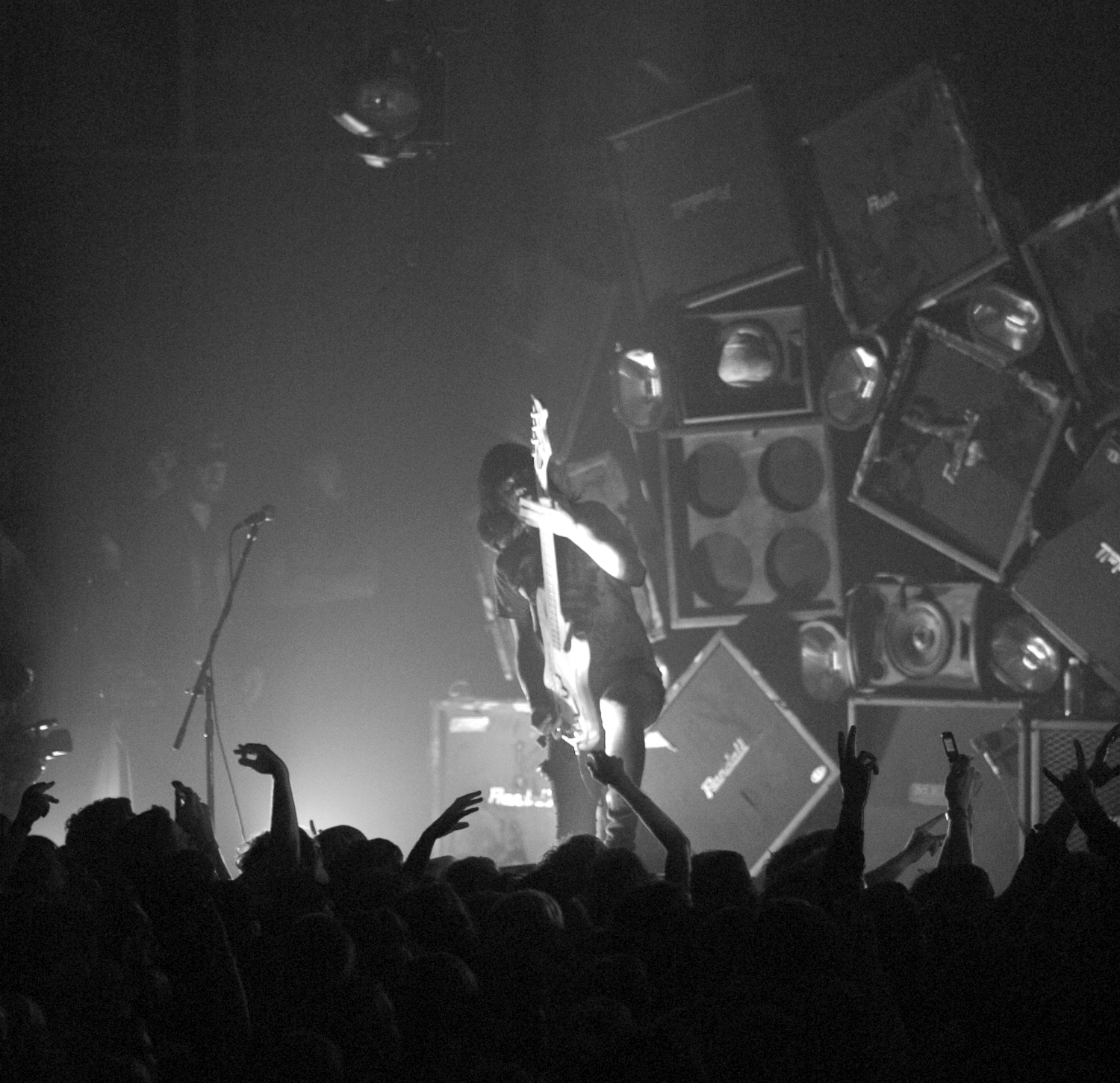
Former bassist Jake Shultz in 2006

Current

- Cory Brandan – lead vocals, additional guitars (2004–present), bass (2017–2019)
- Matt Marquez – drums (2010–2012, 2013, 2019–present)
- Jeff Hickey – lead guitar (2011–2019, 2024–present), bass (2017–2019)
- Phillip Farris – rhythm guitar, backing vocals (2015–2018, 2019–2021, 2022 (touring), 2023–present)
- Grayson Stewart – rhythm guitar (2018–2019, 2024–present), lead guitar (2019–present), bass (2018–2022), backing vocals (2018–present)
- Clay Crenshaw – bass, backing vocals (2019–present), lead guitar (2019–2022)

Former

- Josh Scogin – lead vocals (1997–2002)
- Scottie H. Henry – lead guitar (1997–2011)
- Chris John Day – rhythm guitar, backing vocals (1997–2015)
- Josh Swofford – bass (1997–2000)
- Daniel Davison – drums (1997–2007)
- Mick Bailey – turntables, samples (1997–2001)
- Josh Doolittle – bass, backing vocals(2000–2002)
- Jake Schultz – bass (2002–2012)
- Chris Raines – drums (2007–2010)
- Clayton "Goose" Holyoak – drums (2012–2017)
- John Finnegan – bass (2013–2017)
- Michael Palmquist – rhythm guitar (2022-2023), bass (2019–2020 (touring))

Former touring musicians

- Brad Norris – lead vocals (2002–2004)
- Billy Nottke – bass (2002)
- Sebastian Lueth – lead guitar (2017)
- Igor Efimov – rhythm guitar (2017, 2024)
- Christian Prince – bass (2017–2019)
- Eric Choi – drums (2017)
- Johnny Muench – bass (2019–2020)

Session musicians

- Matt Putman – auxiliary percussion (2006), drums (2019)

== Discography ==
=== Luti-Kriss ===
==== Studio albums ====
- Throwing Myself (2001)

==== EPs ====
- Luti-Kriss + Travail with Travail (1999)
- 5ep (2000)
- One Night Split with Beloved (2002)

=== Norma Jean ===
Norma Jean discography
- Studio albums: 9
- Extended plays: 1
- Compilation albums: 2
- Singles: 12
- Music videos: 20

==== Studio albums ====
Year	Album	Label	Chart peaks				
Year	Album	Label	US	US Christian	US Rock	US Hard Rock	US Indie
2002	Bless the Martyr and Kiss the Child	Solid State	—	—	—	—	—
2005	O' God, the Aftermath	Solid State	62	1	—	—	—
2006	Redeemer	Solid State	38	1	18	—	—
2008	The Anti Mother	Solid State	29	2	10	4	—
2010	Meridional	Razor & Tie	45	2	15	6	—
2013	Wrongdoers	Razor & Tie	37	1	7	3	8
2016	Polar Similar	Solid State	75	—	16	3	11
2019	All Hail	Solid State	—	3	15	6	12
2022	Deathrattle Sing for Me	Solid State	—	—	—	—	—

==== Music videos ====
Year	Name	Album	Director
2002	"Memphis Will Be Laid to Waste"	Bless the Martyr and Kiss the Child	Norma Jean
2002	"Face:Face"	Bless the Martyr and Kiss the Child	Darren Doane
2005	"Bayonetwork: Vultures in Vivid Color"	O God, the Aftermath	N/A
2005	"Absentimental: Street Clam"	O God, the Aftermath	N/A
2005	"Liarsenic: Creating a Universe of Discourse"	O God, the Aftermath	N/A
2006	"Blueprints for Future Homes"	Redeemer	Popcore Film
2006	"Songs Sound Much Sadder"	Redeemer	Popcore Film
2008	"Robots 3 Humans 0"	The Anti Mother	Daniel Chestnut
2010	"Kill More Presidents"	Meridional	Norma Jean
2010	"Deathbed Atheist"	Meridional	Linus Johansson
2011	"Bastardizer"	Meridional	Brooks Jones
2013	"If You Got it at Five, You Got it at Fifty"	Wrongdoers	Daniel Davison
2013	"Sword in Mouth, Fire Eyes"	Wrongdoers	Eli Berg
2016	"Everyone Talking Over Everyone Else"	Polar Similar	Anthony Altamura
2017	"1,000,000 Watts"	Polar Similar	Anthony Altamura
2017	"I. The Planet"	Polar Similar	
2019	"Children of the Dead"	Polar Similar (Vinyl Edition)	
2019	"[Mind Over Mind]"	All Hail	
2022	"Landslide Defeater"	All Hail	Kevin Johnson
2022	"/with_errors"	All Hail	Shane Gray
2022	"Call for the Blood"	Deathrattle Sing for Me	Shane Gray
2022	"Sleep Explosion"	Deathrattle Sing for Me	Kevin Johnson
2022	"A Killing Word"	Deathrattle Sing for Me	Kevin Johnson

==== Singles ====
Song	Release date	Album	Format
"Leaderless and Self Enlisted"	May 6, 2010	Meridional	Digital single
"Kill More Presidents"	July 10, 2010	Meridional (Best Buy and Napster version)	Digital single
"AHH! SHARK BITE AHH!"	January 11, 2013	Non-album single	3.5-inch vinyl
"If You Got It at Five, You Got It at Fifty"	June 25, 2013	Wrongdoers	Digital single
"1,000,000 Watts"	June 14, 2016	Polar Similar	Digital single
"Forever Hurtling Towards Andromeda"	August 12, 2016	Polar Similar	Digital single
"Children of the Dead"	January 12, 2019	Polar Similar (Vinyl Edition)	Digital single
"[Mind Over Mind]"	July 19, 2019	All Hail	Digital single
"Landslide Defeater"	August 16, 2019	All Hail	Digital single
"/with_errors"	September 19, 2019	All Hail	Digital single
"Safety Last"	October 4, 2019	All Hail	Digital single
"Call for the Blood"	June 16, 2022	Deathrattle Sing for Me	Digital single

==== EPs ====
- 2002: Norma Jean / mewithoutYou

Track listing

#	Song	Artist	Length
Side one
1.	"I Used to Hate Cell Phones, But Now I Hate Car Accidents"	Norma Jean	5:02
2.	"The Shotgun Message"	Norma Jean	1:37
Side two
1.	"Bullet to Binary"	mewithoutYou	2:47
2.	"Gentlemen"	mewithoutYou	2:49

==== Compilations ====
- 2008: The Almighty Norma Jean Vinyl Boxset
- 2010: Birds and Microscopes and Bottles of Elixirs and Raw Steak and a Bunch of Songs

== Awards ==
Grammy Awards and nominations

- O God, the Aftermath – Best Recording Package, 2006 (nomination)
