= Bless the Martyr and Kiss the Child =

Studio album by Norma Jean
- Released: August 13, 2002
- Recorded: April 15 – May 5, 2002, at Zing Studio, Westfield, Massachusetts
- Genres: Progressive metalcore; mathcore; post-metal; sludge metal
- Length: 58:25
- Label: Solid State
- Producers: Adam Dutkiewicz; Norma Jean

Norma Jean chronology
Throwing Myself (2001)	Bless the Martyr and Kiss the Child (2002)	O' God, the Aftermath (2005)

Bless the Martyr and Kiss the Child is the debut studio album by American metalcore band Norma Jean, released on August 13, 2002 by Solid State Records. It is the band's only album to feature bassist Joshua Doolittle and vocalist Josh Scogin, the latter of whom later became the lead vocalist of The Chariot and '68.

== Background ==
The band previously released a studio album, Throwing Myself, under the name of Luti-Kriss. The band changed their name due to keyboardist Mick Bailey and bassist Josh Swafford leaving and also wanted to go in a different musical direction (the band played a nu metal/metalcore hybrid). According to drummer Daniel Davison, the band got the name Norma Jean from actress Marilyn Monroe, whose real name is Norma Jeane Baker. After settling on the new name, the band members read a book that claimed "Norma" means "pattern", and "Jean" means "God's grace and mercy", with Norma Jean combined meaning "Patterns of grace and mercy".

Older recordings of the songs "I Used to Hate Cellphones, But Now I Hate Car Accidents" and "The Shotgun Message" were released on a split album with mewithoutYou.

The entire album was recorded live with very few overdubs. The booklet insert claims that the CD was produced entirely without the use of computers.

On the Limited Edition, the song "Pretty Soon, I Don't Know What, but Something Is Going to Happen" features a sample from the 1998 film π, directed by Darren Aronofsky. The song "Face:Face" draws inspiration from Proverbs 30.

== Music ==
Revolver stated that the album's sound fused "the chaos of Converge with the angelic melody and dramatic flair of From Autumn to Ashes and their ilk."

== Release ==
The album was released on August 13, 2002, through Solid State Records. Music videos were released for the songs "Memphis Will Be Laid to Waste" and "Face:Face". In the music video for "Memphis Will Be Laid to Waste" it featured touring vocalist Brad Norris and new bassist Jake Schultz instead of Scogin and Doolittle, who had already left the band. Aaron Weiss of mewithoutYou appears on the track "Memphis Will be Laid to Waste" courtesy of Tooth & Nail Records. "Memphis..." had a music video featuring a curious story concept featuring subtitles. It aired on Uranium and Headbangers Ball upon its release.

== Reception and legacy ==
Professional ratings
Review scores
Source	Rating
Allmusic	link
Cross Rhythms	link
Exclaim!	Highly favorable link
Jesusfreakhideout	link
MusicOMH	Highly favorable link
The Phantom Tollbooth	link
Punknews.org	link
Today's Christian Music	B link

Since its release, Bless the Martyr and Kiss the Child has received critical acclaim and is often regarded a landmark in the metalcore genre, often being regarded as one of the best albums released in the genre. The album's influence has been observed in the work of bands such as the Devil Wears Prada and Of Mice & Men.

Jason D. Taylor of Allmusic awarded the album 4 out of 5 stars. Taylor praised the band's "blast of macabre hardcore/metal" and the production by Adam Dutkiewicz. Mike Rimmer of Cross Rhythms gave the album 9 out of 10, saying it was "an hour of unrelenting guitar noise". Greg Pratt of Exclaim! compared Norma Jean to the likes of Zao and Living Sacrifice, while praising the progressive metalcore sound of the album and said the album is a must for anyone who is a fan of heavy music. Jesusfreakhideout's Andy Kelly said the album signaled "the hardcore revolution" with a "technically and musically astounding offering". Kelly concluded his review by stating "hardcore just does not get much better than this."

== Track listing ==
All lyrics are written by Josh Scogin; all music is composed by Norma Jean.

No.	Title	Length
1.	"The Entire World Is Counting on Me, and They Don't Even Know It"	3:10
2.	"Face:Face"	3:31
3.	"Memphis Will Be Laid to Waste" (feat. Aaron Weiss)	4:56
4.	"Creating Something Out of Nothing, Only to Destroy It"	6:22
5.	"Pretty Soon, I Don't Know What, But Something Is Going to Happen"	15:49
6.	"The Shotgun Message"	1:37
7.	"Sometimes It's Our Mistakes That Make for the Greatest Ideas"	3:15
8.	"I Used to Hate Cell Phones, But Now I Hate Car Accidents"	5:02
9.	"It Was As If the Dead Man Stood Upon the Air"	1:30
10.	"The Human Face, Divine"	5:41
11.	"Organized Beyond Recognition"	7:28
Total length:		58:25

Limited edition track listing
No.	Title	Length
1.	"The Entire World Is Counting On Me, and They Don't Even Know It"	3:15
2.	"Face:Face"	3:35
3.	"Memphis Will Be Laid to Waste" (feat. Aaron Weiss)	5:00
4.	"Creating Something Out of Nothing, Only to Destroy It"	6:42
5.	"Pretty Soon, I Don't Know What, But Something Is Going to Happen" (Contains soundbite from the film Pi)	15:53
6.	"The Shotgun Message"	1:50
7.	"Sometimes It's Our Mistakes That Make for the Greatest Ideas"	3:19
8.	"I Used to Hate Cell Phones, But Now I Hate Car Accidents"	5:15
9.	"Untitled" (instrumental)	2:07
10.	"It Was As If the Dead Man Stood Upon the Air"	1:38
11.	"The Human Face, Divine"	5:49
12.	"Organized Beyond Recognition"	7:32

== Personnel ==
Norma Jean

- Josh Scogin – lead vocals
- Christopher Day – guitar
- Scottie Henry – guitar, backing vocals
- Joshua Doolittle – bass
- Daniel Davison – drums

Additional personnel

- Produced by Adam Dutkiewicz and Norma Jean
- Mastered by Alan Douches
- Additional vocals, Piano, guitar, and tambourine by Aaron Johnathan Weiss
- A&R by Roy Culver
- Photography by David Stuart
- Art direction and design by Asterik Studio

== Videos ==
1. "Memphis Will Be Laid to Waste"
2. "Face:Face"
