= Spoken (album) =

Studio album by Spoken
- Released: September 25, 2007
- Genres: Alternative rock, hard rock, Christian alternative rock
- Length: 38:15
- Label: Tooth & Nail
- Producer: Travis Wyrick

Spoken chronology
Last Chance to Breathe (2005)	Spoken (2007)	Illusion (2013)

Spoken is the sixth studio album released by the Christian hard rock band Spoken. The album was released on September 25, 2007. Radio singles released from this album include "When Hope Is All You Have" and "Trading in This Troubled Heart".

== Critical reception ==
Professional ratings
Review scores
Source	Rating
CCM Magazine	3.5/5 stars
Christianity Today	4/5 stars
Cross Rhythms	8/10 squares
Jesus Freak Hideout	4/5 stars

Awarding the album three and a half stars for CCM Magazine, Andy Argyrakis states, "[Spoken] continue[s] its fiery, hard-rock groundwork, while exploding with additional diversity and heavy-handed experimentation." Russ Breimeier, giving the album four stars at Christianity Today, writes, "The versatility in sound and style ultimately makes this album the best yet from Spoken—even if the first song isn't their strongest." Rating the album an eight out of ten from Cross Rhythms, Jeremy Williams describes, "a heavy album that knows when to pause for breath." Lindsay Wiseman, indicating in a four star review by Jesus Freak Hideout, says, "this album delivers in all aspects." Signaling in a review at The Phantom Tollbooth, Ryan Ro criticizes, "Spoken is yet another unnecessary addition to the Tooth & Nail catalogue, a faceless band in a sea of faceless bands, a clone of a clone of a clone. Pass on this one."

== Track listing ==
No.	Title	Length
1.	"History Erased"	2:26
2.	"Close Your Eyes"	3:15
3.	"Not Soon Forgotten"	2:43
4.	"Trading in This Troubled Heart"	3:27
5.	"You're the One"	4:33
6.	"Brought to Life"	2:50
7.	"Long Live the Dream"	2:31
8.	"Start the Revolution"	6:19
9.	"The Meaning Of..."	3:20
10.	"When Hope Is All You Have"	2:46
11.	"The Answer"	4:00
Total length:		38:15

== Singles ==
- "When Hope Is All You Have"
- "Trading In This Troubled Heart"

== Personnel ==
- Matt Baird – lead vocals
- Jef Cunningham – guitar
- Aaron Wiese – guitar
- Brandon Thigpen – bass guitar
- Oliver Crumpton – drums

== Chart performance ==
Chart (2007)	Peak position
US Top Christian Albums (Billboard)	26
US Heatseekers Albums (Billboard)	26
