= Redeemer (Norma Jean album) =

Studio album by Norma Jean
- Released: September 12, 2006
- Recorded: April–May 2006
- Studio: Radiostar Studio
- Genres: Metalcore; mathcore; post-metal; post-hardcore
- Length: 41:44
- Labels: Solid State, Century, Abacus
- Producer: Ross Robinson

Norma Jean chronology
O' God, the Aftermath (2005)	Redeemer (2006)	The Anti Mother (2008)

Professional ratings
Review scores
Source	Rating
AbsolutePunk.net	(81%)
AllMusic	3.5/5 stars
Boise Weekly	Highly unfavorable
Cross Rhythms	9/10 stars
Exclaim!	Slightly favorable
musicOMH	4/5 stars
Sputnikmusic	3.5/5
Stylus Magazine	(B)

Redeemer is the third studio album by American metalcore band Norma Jean. It was released on September 12, 2006 in the United States, and on October 3, 2006 in Canada. The album sold more than 21,000 records in its first week. It is the last album to feature drummer Daniel Davison. For this album they filmed videos for "Blueprints for Future Homes", and "Songs Sound Much Sadder". Shannon Crawford, the singer of Cellophane and Monster in the Machine, painted the album artwork, in which musician Poppy Jean Crawford is depicted as the girl being attacked by a crow.

== Track listing ==
All tracks are written by Norma Jean, including where noted.

No.	Title	Writer(s)	Length
1.	"A Grand Scene for a Color Film"		3:24
2.	"Blueprints for Future Homes"		2:49
3.	"A Small Spark vs. A Great Forest"		5:00
4.	"A Temperamental Widower"		2:46
5.	"The End of All Things Will Be Televised"		5:11
6.	"Songs Sound Much Sadder"	Timothy McTague	3:04
7.	"The Longest Lasting Statement"		2:47
8.	"Amnesty Please"		4:14
9.	"Like Swimming Circles"		3:04
10.	"Cemetery Like a Stage"		4:26
11.	"No Passenger: No Parasite"		4:58
Total length:			41:44

== Personnel ==
Norma Jean

- Cory Brandan - vocals, guitars
- Scottie Henry - guitars
- Chris Day - guitars
- Jake Schultz - bass guitar
- Daniel Davison - drums

Additional musicians

- Matthew Putman - percussion and additional drums

Production

- Ross Robinson - mixing
- Ryan Boesch - engineering, mixing
- Kale Holmes - assistant engineer
- Asterik Studio - art direction, design
- Shannon Crawford - album art paintings

== Notes ==
- The song "Blueprints for Future Homes" was the first song to be "released" on their MySpace and Purevolume pages on 7/25/06 at 12:01 AM EST.
- The song "The End of All Things Will Be Televised" was the second song to be "released" on their MySpace and Purevolume pages on 8/4/06 at 12:01 AM EST.
- The song "A Small Spark vs. A Great Forest" was the third song to be released on their Purevolume and MySpace.
- The song "A Small Spark vs. A Great Forest" refers to James 3:5-12 from the New Testament.
- The song "No Passenger: No Parasite" seems to have derived its title and the majority of lyrics from the book "Mere Christianity" by C.S. Lewis, in which Lewis describes a fully Christian society as having "no passengers or parasites".
- The song "Songs Sound Much Sadder" was featured on This is Solid State Vol. 6
