= ...What Remains =

What Remains

Studio album by Spoken
- Released: November 6, 1999
- Genres: Nu metal, rap metal, Christian rock
- Label: Metro 1 Music

Spoken chronology
On Your Feet (1997)	What Remains (1999)	Echoes of the Spirit Still Dwell (2000)

Professional ratings
Review scores
Source	Rating
Cross Rhythms	9/10
HM Magazine	unrated
The Phantom Tollbooth	1.5/5 & 3.5/5

...What Remains is the second album by the Christian rock band Spoken. The album is a combination of "rap meets metal, and a bit of melodic rock"

== Track listing ==
No.	Title	Length
1.	Untitled	0:42
2.	"Your Grace Alone"	3:10
3.	"Silent Voice"	2:54
4.	"The God You Follow"	3:33
5.	"Prepare to Meet Thy God"	3:17
6.	"When I Fall"	3:59
7.	"So Far From God"	3:37
8.	"Taken for Granted"	4:04
9.	"Forgive Me"	3:42
10.	"New Life"	2:27
11.	"Runaway"	5:11
12.	Untitled	1:02
13.	"Fly With Me" (featuring K2S)	3:40
14.	"People Get Ready, Jesus Is Comin'"	7:19
15.	Untitled	0:04

- A secret song, a comedic take on the song "So Far from God" with Matt Baird singing "I am a Rock Star" can be found 6:06 into the 14th track "People Get Ready, Jesus Is Comin'".
