= Throwing Myself =

Studio album by Luti-Kriss
- Released: March 13, 2001
- Studio: Wherehouse Studio in Vancouver
- Genres: Metalcore; nu metal
- Length: 55:40
- Label: Solid State
- Producers: Andre Wahl; Jesse Smith

Luti-Kriss chronology
5ep (2000)	Throwing Myself (2001)	Bless the Martyr and Kiss the Child (2002)

Professional ratings
Review scores
Source	Rating
Allmusic	3/5 stars
Jesus Freak Hideout	4/5 stars

Throwing Myself is the only studio album by American metalcore band Norma Jean under the name Luti-Kriss. It was released in 2001 on Solid State Records. The band changed their name after its the release.

== Track listing ==
No.	Title	Length
1.	"Local 1145"	1:11
2.	"Black Smith" (feat. Sammy Frenette)	5:41
3.	"The 'Anni Hilat' Ion"	2:57
4.	"Light Blue Collar"	3:31
5.	"Patiently Philadelphia"	4:56
6.	"100 Powell"	3:50
7.	"An Act of My Own Volition"	4:13
8.	"Last Breath/First"	4:31
9.	"Catharsis"	4:14
10.	"Petty Larson"	4:41
11.	"For Shadows"	4:53
12.	"silence"	6:00
13.	"A Chase in the Crowd" (hidden song)	5:04
Total length:		55:40

Vinyl track listing
No.	Title	Length
1.	"Intro"	1:12
2.	"Blacksmith" (feat. Sammy Frenette)	5:41
3.	"Anniehilate"	2:53
4.	"Lightblue Collar"	3:32
5.	"Patiently Philadelphia"	4:57
6.	"I Covenant"	3:50
7.	"Act of My Own"	4:14
8.	"Last Breath First"	4:31
9.	"Throwing Myself"	4:14
10.	"Petty Larson"	4:40
11.	"For Shadows"	4:53

== Personnel ==
Luti-Kriss

- Josh Scogin – vocals
- Scottie Henry – lead guitar
- Chris Day – rhythm guitar
- Josh Doolittle – bass
- Mick Bailey – turntables, sampling (left during production)
- Daniel Davison – drums

Additional personnel

- Sammy Frenette – piano (track 2)
- Kris McCaddon – artwork
- Alex "Condor" Aligizakis – engineer
- Bernie Grundman – mastering
- David Johnson – photography
- Dean Maher – engineer
- Chris Potter – technical support
- Jesse Smith – composer, pre-production, producer
- Andre Wahl – mixing, producer
