= Spoken (band) =

American Christian rock band

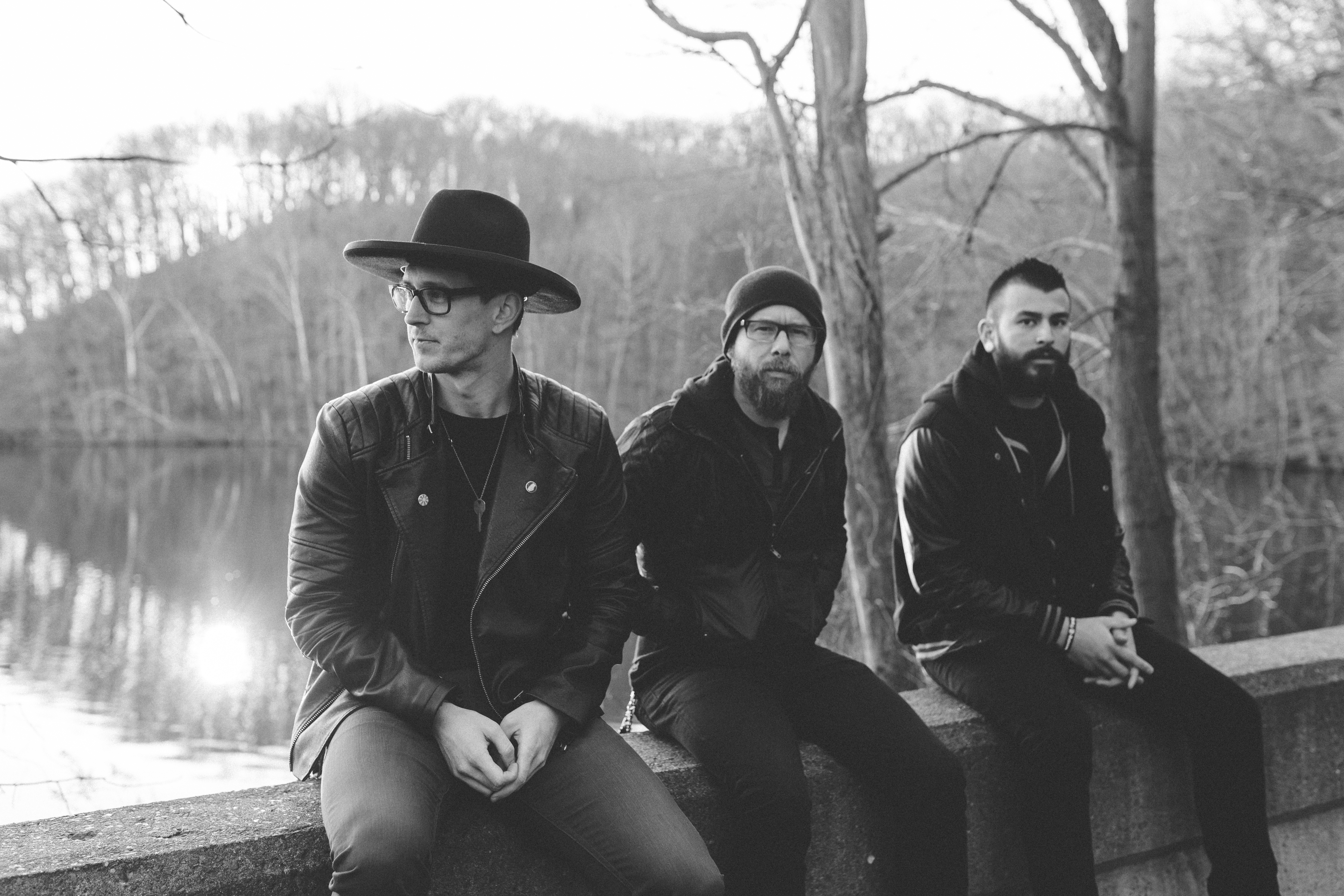
- Spoken in 2015

Background information
- Origin: Nashville, Tennessee, U.S.
- Genres: Christian rock; Christian hardcore; Christian metal; hard rock; rap rock; rapcore; nu metal
- Years active: 1996-present
- Labels: E1, Tooth & Nail, Metro 1
- Members: Matt Baird; J.R. Bareis; Dylan Levernoch; Jared Wisner
- Past members: Scoop Roberts; Isaiah Perez; Oliver Crumpton; Ryan Pei; Jesse McDermott; Jon Allen; Jef Cunningham; Steven Howk; Ronnie Crupper; B.J. Watson; Ryan Jordan; Aaron Wiese; Travis Pierce; Roy Elam; Brandon Thigpen; Michael Head
- Website: spokenmusic.com

Spoken is an American Christian rock band from Nashville, Tennessee. They have released nine studio albums; three via Metro 1 Music, three via Tooth & Nail Records, one via E1 Music, one via Artery Recordings, and one independently.

== History ==
The band was formed in Nashville, Tennessee in 1996. Vocalist Matt Baird is the only original member of the band remaining in its current lineup since the band's formation.

The band released their debut album, On Your Feet, on September 22, 1997, through Metro 1 Music. The album showcased a rap-rock fusion of a post-hardcore or melodic rock style with a nu metal or rap rock leaning sound, similar to that utilized by bands such Rage Against the Machine or 311, or by their peers such as P.O.D., Pillar, and Thousand Foot Krutch, among others, but with more emphasis in the post-hardcore leanings of the band's style.

The band released their second album, ...What Remains, on February 2, 1999, once again through Metro 1 Music. The album's sound showcased a nu metal/rap influenced rock style very similar to the band's debut.

The band released their third album, Echoes of the Spirit Still Dwell, on October 3, 2000, again through Metro 1 Music. The album's sound showcased once more the nu metal/rap rock leanings of the first two, but focused more on the heavy aspects of the genre. On November 19, 2001, the band released a compilation album, Spoken Greatest Hits, which compiled songs from their previous and first three albums. This was their last release through Metro 1 Music.

Spoken then signed to Tooth & Nail Records to release their fourth album, titled A Moment of Imperfect Clarity, which released on September 2, 2003. This, and their subsequent albums on Tooth and Nail, highlighted an evolving sound in which first melody and then a post-hardcore sound were introduced and stressed. The band shot music videos for "Promise" and "Falling Further"

On August 30, 2005, Spoken released their fifth album, Last Chance to Breathe. The style changed even more, becoming more based on screams than heavy guitar work. A music video was shot for "Bitter Taste", a single from the album, featuring Cory Brandon Putman of Norma Jean.

On September 25, 2007, Spoken released their self-titled sixth album, Spoken. The sound was heavier and more mature, with both heavy vocals and heavy guitar work. Matt Baird, the lead vocalist for Spoken, said this about their sound: "Our new record has a lot of diversity. There are songs that are heavier than anything we've done before, and there is a song that is mostly piano. The songs are really all over the place as far as a similar style or genre, but it works. I think the record is extremely cohesive. I can't wait for people to hear it."

Spoken worked on their next album throughout 2009 with producer Jasen Rauch. They later revealed that their seventh record was finished, and was released on February 12, 2013, through E1 Music and is called, Illusion.

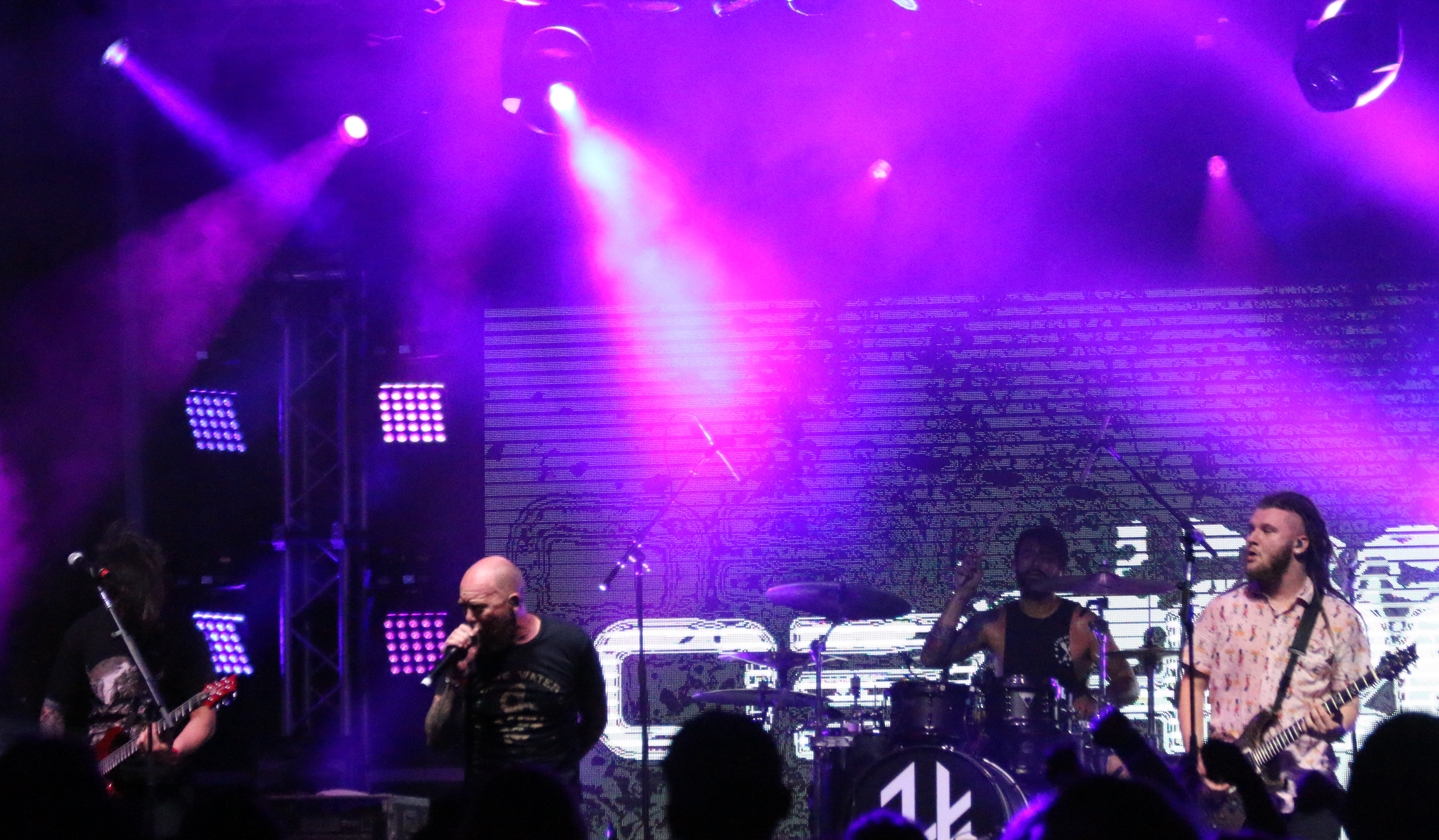
Spoken performing at Lifest in 2018

The band announced via their Facebook page on November 28, 2014, that they would release a new album in 2015. A later interview with singer Matt Baird revealed the band would be recording at least one song in January as a promo track and then the remainder of the album would be recorded in May 2015. On December 11, 2015, the band released their eighth album, Breathe Again, through Artery Recordings.

On November 26, 2016, Scoop Roberts announced that he was embarking on a final tour with the band and that he would be on the next album. The band's ninth album, titled simply IX, was released on September 8, 2017, independently via The Fuel Music.

On April 11, 2019, the band announced that guitarist J.R. Bareis (Love & Death, ex-Islander) was joining the band. Bareis had been touring with the band as a hired gun since 2017. With this addition, they also announced that they were writing for the band's tenth studio album.

In light of the COVID-19 pandemic in 2020, the band released 4 new songs in the span of 5 months. "The Way Back Home" on February 21, 2020, "Awaken Me" on April 3, 2020, "Fallen" on June 5, 2020, and "Nightmare" on June 12, 2020. Lyric videos premiered on the band's YouTube channel for the songs, "The Way Back Home", and, "Nightmare", on their day of release. On February 20, 2021, a live, "at home", acoustic performance of the song, "Nightmare", was released on the band's YouTube page.

On December 6, 2023, the band announced their tenth album Reflection, which was released on March 15, 2024, under Brian "Head" Welch's new label XOVR. Welch appeared on the album along with Demon Hunter's Ryan Clark.

== Discography ==
Studio albums

- On Your Feet (September 22, 1997) (Metro 1 Music)
- ...What Remains (February 2, 1999) (Metro 1 Music)
- Echoes of the Spirit Still Dwell (October 3, 2000) (Metro 1 Music)
- A Moment of Imperfect Clarity (September 2, 2003) (Tooth & Nail Records)
- Last Chance to Breathe (August 30, 2005) (Tooth & Nail Records)
- Spoken (September 25, 2007) (Tooth & Nail Records)
- Illusion (February 12, 2013) (E1 Music)
- Breathe Again (December 11, 2015) (Artery Recordings)
- IX (September 8, 2017) (The Fuel Music)
- Reflection (March 15, 2024) (XOVR Records)

Singles

- The Way Back Home (February 20, 2020) (Independent)
- Fallen (June 5, 2020) (Independent)
- Nightmare (June 9, 2020) (Independent)

Compilations

- Spoken Greatest Hits (January 19, 2001)

Music videos

- "Forevermore"
- "Falling Further"
- "Promise"
- "Bitter Taste"
- "Trading In This Troubled Heart"
- "Through It All"
- "Breathe Again"
- "Falling Apart"
