= Tucky =

Tucky may refer to:

- Tucky Williams
- Tucky Buzzard
- Kentucky
