= Gabriel (album) =

Studio album by Believer
- Released: March 17, 2009
- Recorded: November 2007 – November 2008
- Genre: Technical thrash metal
- Length: 60:54
- Label: Metal Blade/Cesspool
- Producer: The Trauma Team

Believer chronology
Dimensions (1993)	Gabriel (2009)	Transhuman (2011)

Gabriel is the fourth studio album by American thrash metal band Believer, released on March 17, 2009 on Cesspool Recordings, an imprint of Metal Blade Records. A comeback album, it is the band's first new release since 1993. The album was met with mostly positive reviews.

== Recording history ==
Recorded in late 2008, on Gabriel the band lineup consists of Kurt Bachman (vocals, guitar), Joey Daub (drums), Jeff King (keyboards, of Fountain of Tears fame), Kevin Leaman (guitar), and Elton Nestler (bass). Scott Laird (violin) and Jim Winters (guitar)—who both played with the band previously—also contributed to the album as session musicians. William Keller was an additional session player (voices on Dimensions). Deron Miller of CKY played some guitar parts and went to comment that "Believer have been one of my favorite bands for 20 years so this is really exciting for me. Check out the three records they did in the '90s... All three are works of genius." Other guest performances were done by Joe Rico of the band Sacrifice, with whom Believer toured in the early 1990s, and Rocky Gray of Living Sacrifice. Believer signed with Metal Blade Records' imprint Cesspool Recordings, owned by Killswitch Engage vocalist Howard Jones who commented: "Somehow I got lucky enough to stumble across a reactivated Believer who has always been a band that got and still gets repeated listens from me. Great band and even better people, and they truly bring a unique quality of musicianship back into the metal music genre. I'm truly excited to see them on stage again." Jones contributed some guest vocals for the song "The Brave".

An unmastered version of the song "Medwton" from the album premiered on Bam Margera's Radio Bam show on November 17. Deron Miller wanted to play the song on the show since he played guitar solo on it. The tracks "Focused Lethality" and "Stoned" were released as singles.

Eye Level Studios created the album's artwork; a live model was masked and photographed wearing actual horns. In an interview with Fazer magazine, Bachman stated they plan to release an artbook based on the cover art with Eye Level Studios.

Kurt Bachman commented that the album sounds like a "sick, insane cross between Tool, Voivod, Nine Inch Nails and Destruction." Bachman commented the album's musical style:

We think that fans will hear some of each record but the writing is a bit different. It's still Believer but we wanted to offer something new as we have in the past. Some people would like us to put out another Sanity Obscure or Dimensions but we didn't want to rehash the past. Those close to us have said that the new material sounds like a natural progression from 'Dimensions'. We wanted to have fun with this and get back to our emotional metal roots. Getting together to write and record was exciting. It's when the creativity and insanity was let loose.

— Kurt Bachman on the Gabriel's musical direction in Decibel Magazine.

== Reception ==
Professional ratings
Review scores
Source	Rating
About.com	3.5/5 stars
Allmusic	3.5/5 stars
Blistering	8/10 stars
Chronicles of Chaos	8/10
Cross Rhythms	6/10 squares
HM	3/5 stars
Lords of Metal	85/100
Metal Forces	7.5/10
Sputnikmusic	4/5 stars

The critical reception of the album has been positive. Greg Prato of AllMusic gave the album 3.5 points out of 5 commenting that, despite being 16 years in silence, Believer is "automatically back in business." Prato notices that the album is closer to the band's origins, as it contains "few nods to vintage late-'80s/early-'90s metal" although "a challenging, almost proggy edge can be detected in all the manic six-string riffing and growling, especially on such tracks as the album-opening "Medwton," plus "Focused Lethality" and the slowly building "The Brave."

Justin Donnelly of Blistering magazine gave the album 8 out of 10. Pointing out that each song on the album is unique and contain different ideas, he states that the experimental "Redshift" is "quite possibly one of the album's most memorable efforts with its huge infectious chugging riffs, swathes of melodic keyboards and its reoccurring breakdown passages where the bass and drums provide some cool breathing space." Trey Spencer of Sputnikmusic gave the album four out of five points and noted: "As odd as it might sound, this album is actually a breath of fresh air for a metal community that is becoming increasingly stagnant. With Gabriel the band has managed to bring back that old-school thrash sound, but also mix in a large dose of technicality and originality while still sounding very current."

Chris Beck of HM wrote that "Fifteen years is a long time. Long enough to forget just how brutal Believer's music was, how insane Joey Daub's drumming was and how the band composed riffs so technical that most other bands wouldn't have dreamed of playing them." He also stated that "Gabriel could easily have been released years ago as the immediate follow-up to Dimensions" and praised the album: "Metal isn't supposed to sound this good." Criticism was given for the elements of keyboard, sound and voice programming throughout that Beck felt were "slightly overused" as he wished that the band would have "let the music stand by itself". Beck concludes that "this is unmistakably Believer, and unmistakably a great album." AOL listed the artwork for Gabriel among "ten best album covers of 2009 so far" list. Exclaim! concluded that "Like its namesake angel, Gabriel is a messenger from the prog-metal gods that Believer are back with the heaviest album of their career."

Not all reviewers were excited about the album; an Abort magazine editor commented that Gabriel is "a well-intentioned if somewhat bland return to form".

== Track listing ==
1. Medwton – 7:23
2. A Moment In Prime – 6:07
3. Stoned – 4:32
4. Redshift – 5:21
5. History of Decline – 3:49
6. The Need For Conflict – 5:14
7. Focused Lethality – 3:46
8. Shut Out The Sun – 5:38
9. The Brave – 4:19
10. Nonsense Mediated Decay – 8:49
- iTunes Bonus Tracks
1. Circus – 0:23
2. Coordinates – 0:28
3. Freedom – 4:57

== Personnel ==
Believer

- Kurt Bachman – vocals, guitar
- Joey Daub – drums
- Jeff King – keyboards, programming
- Elton Nestler – bass guitar, programming

Additional musicians

- Joe Rico (Sacrifice) – guitar solo on "A Moment In Prime"
- Deron Miller (CKY, World Under Blood) – guitar solo on "Medwton"
- Rocky Gray (Evanescence, Soul Embraced, Living Sacrifice) – guitar solo on "Focused Lethality"
- Howard Jones (Killswitch Engage) – vocals on "The Brave"
- Scott Laird – violin on "A Moment In Prime"
- Jim Winters – guitar solos on "Stoned" and "History of Decline"
- William Keller – voices on "Medwton"
- John and Alexander Boden – voices on "Nonsense Medicated Decay"
