= Dagger Kiss =

American fantasy adventure series

Dagger Kiss is an American fantasy adventure series created by and starring Girl/Girl Scene creator Tucky Williams. It premiered on the streaming website Tello on February 14, 2016. The eight episode series now airs for free on Amazon Prime and on its official website. On July 1, 2016, Williams announced a second season.

== Plot ==
Arden (Tucky Williams) travels to Earth after the death of her lover Mia (Stoya). Arden is attacked, and her life is saved by Katia, who is a stranger to Arden. Katia takes Arden under her wing as Arden is pursued by the sorcerer Zareth.

== Cast ==
=== Main ===
- Tucky Williams as Arden
- Amanda K. Morales as Katia
- Stoya as Mia

=== Recurring ===
- Roni Jonah as Jenna
- Thomas J. Phillips as Zareth
- Silvio Wolf Busch as Yamin
- Jessica Paige York as Emily

== Distribution ==
All eight episodes of the series were released weekly from February - April 2016 on the streaming service tello Films. Williams began releasing episodes on YouTube in March 2016. The series is now airing on Amazon Video. It can also be found on Vimeo.

== Cultural Impact ==
Dagger Kiss has been called "a lesbian Lord of the Rings." Dagger Kiss is a female, LGBT take on standard fantasy-adventure tales. According to Divine Magazine, "It is the first time a fantasy series, TV show or movie has had two lead female characters who are explicitly lovers".
