= Stoya =

American pornographic film actress and writer (born 1986/1987)

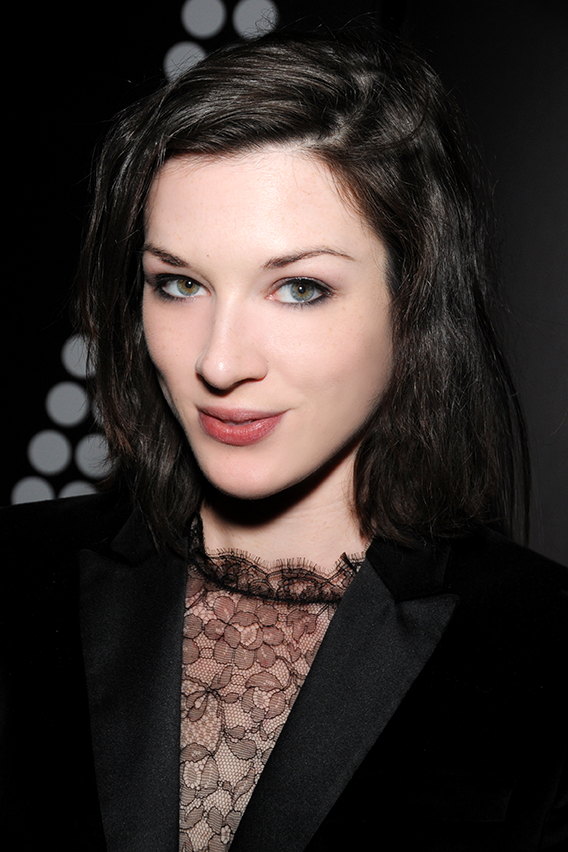
- Stoya in 2014
- Born: Jessica Stoya; 1986 or 1987 (age 39–40); Wilmington, North Carolina, U.S.
- Other name: Stoya
- Occupations: Pornographic film actress; model; author
- Years active: 2007–present

Jessica Stoya (born 1986 or 1987), also known simply as Stoya, is an American pornographic film actress, model, and author. She began her porn career in 2007 in the alt porn scene, and since 2009 has also worked in non-pornographic media, including the 2016 lesbian fantasy series Dagger Kiss.

== Early life ==
Stoya was born in Wilmington, North Carolina to a Scottish father and a Serbian mother. Her given name was chosen by her mother after television news anchor Jessica Savitch. As a child, she wanted to become a dancer, and started dance lessons at the age of three. She was home-schooled and received her high-school diploma before the age of sixteen. Because her father worked in IT, Stoya had access to electronics and gaming equipment, through which she developed her love of technology. "I was three when I was using DOS. My mom taught me how to read, and my dad taught me how to navigate DOS."

After moving to Philadelphia, she attended a summer program at UArts. Some of her jobs in Philadelphia included being a secretary, flier distributor, and a go-go dancer. Stoya appeared in several music videos for bands that, according to her, "no one will ever hear of." In May 2009, Stoya said that she would be moving from Philadelphia and relocating to Los Angeles in the fall of that year.

== Pornographic film career ==
Stoya began posing for adult pictures for a friend, which eventually led her to modelling and working for alt-porn websites. She started performing an adult films in the mid-2000s. In 2009, she trademarked the stage name Stoya, which she based on a shortened version of her grandmother's Serbian maiden name.

Stoya was featured in two DVD productions for Razordolls, and she made a non-sex, cameo appearance in two Vivid Alt titles before being contacted by Digital Playground with a proposition to perform in a hardcore lesbian scene with Sophia Santi. The scene in question never happened, but, in August 2007, she met with several Digital Playground representatives and was asked if she would star in a pornographic scene with male talent. After careful consideration, Stoya agreed.

In October 2007, Digital Playground signed her to an exclusive, three-year contract. Stoya is regarded as the company's first alt porn contract girl. The first scene that she shot for them was for Stoya Video Nasty (promoted on the DVD box as the first film featuring her engaging in heterosexual intercourse), but her first movie released by the company was Jack's POV 9.

In 2012, Stoya was named by CNBC as one of the 12 most popular pornographic film actresses.

Even though Stoya was under exclusive contract with Digital Playground, Evil Angel director John Stagliano received "special permission" in 2013 to cast her in the sequel to the adult film series Voracious. In 2014, she left Digital Playground and focused her career on directing. She financed and directed her first film in February 2014. On March 4, 2014, Stoya and Kayden Kross created the pay-per-scene pornographic website TRENCHCOATx. In addition to running the site, Stoya performed in and also directed some of the films. In 2018, Stoya launched the website zerospaces.com with her business partner, comedian Mitcz Marzoni.

== Mainstream acting ==
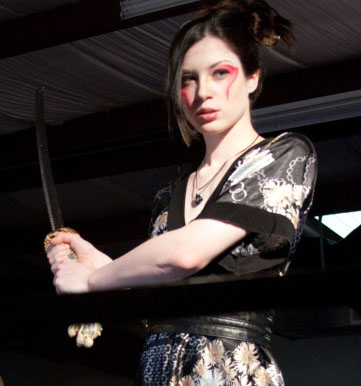
Stoya in "The Kingpin of Pain" (2009)

In 2009, Stoya appeared in her first non-erotic film project as Kamikazi Shegun 5000 in the award-winning 48 Hour Film Project short film "The Kingpin of Pain".

Stoya appears as a main cast member in the 2016 lesbian fantasy series Dagger Kiss.

In February 2018, Stoya starred in the Serbian sci-fi film A.I. Rising (also known as Ederlezi Rising) in the role of the android, Nimani, on a space mission with a cosmonaut played by Slovenian actor Sebastian Cavazza. The two become romantically entwined when the cosmonaut starts to believe there might be something human inside his android companion.

Stoya has acted in two of Dean Haspiel's Off Broadway stage plays: Harakiri Kane (Die! Die, Again!) (2017) and The Last Bar at the End of the World (2018).

== Writing ==
Stoya has written sex advice columns for Slate, Vice, The Verge, and Refinery29. For her Slate column, "How To Do It", she uses the byline Jessica Stoya. She has published pieces in The New York Times, New Statesman, Esquire, and The Guardian, as well as an article in Porn Studies, a peer-reviewed academic journal. She published her first book in 2018, entitled Philosophy, Pussycats, and Porn, a collection of personal and critical essays.

== Personal life ==
Stoya has acknowledged the importance of social networking in her career.

In June 2009, she was reported to be dating Marilyn Manson, but they later broke up due to Manson's touring schedule. Afterwards, she dated pornographic film actor James Deen for several years. In 2015, Stoya publicly accused Deen of raping her, writing on Twitter:

James Deen held me down and fucked me while I said no, stop, used my safeword. I just can't nod and smile when people bring him up anymore.

Deen denied Stoya's allegations, calling them "false and defamatory". Following Stoya's tweet, eight other women went public with assault allegations against Deen, while Stoya herself became a target of online harassment. Several adult film studios severed ties with Deen, and the website The Frisky terminated his column.

== Selected publications ==
- Stoya (2015). "Noooooooodie Girl". In Lee, Jiz (ed.). Coming Out Like a Porn Star: Essays on Pornography, Protection, and Privacy. Berkeley, Calif.: ThreeL Media. pp. 284–286. ISBN 978-0-9905571-6-6 – via the Internet Archive.
- ——— (2018). Philosophy, Pussycats, & Porn. La Vergne, Tenn.: Not A Cult. ISBN 978-1-9456-4943-1.

== Awards ==
- 2008 Eroticline Award – Best U.S. Newcomer
- 2009 AVN Award – Best New Starlet
- 2009 AVN Award – Best All-Girl Group Sex Scene – Cheerleaders
- 2009 XBIZ Award – New Starlet of the Year
- 2009 XRCO Award – New Starlet
- 2012 AVN Award – Hottest Sex Scene (Fan Award) – Babysitters 2
- 2014 XBIZ Award – Best Scene - Feature Movie – Code of Honor
- 2018 FEST Beograd – Best Actress – Ederlezi Rising
- 2019 XBIZ Award – Best Actress - All-Girl Release – Talk Derby to Me
