= Roni Jonah =

Canadian actress & wrestler (born 1986)

Personal information
- Born: July 16, 1986 (age 40) Vancouver, British Columbia, Canada

Professional wrestling career
- Ring name: Roni Jonah
- Billed height: 5 ft 9 in (175 cm)
- Billed weight: 125 lb (57 kg)
- Trained by: Al Snow
- Debut: March 2006

Roni Jonah (born July 16, 1986) is a Canadian director, actress, and professional wrestler. She has worked for both Ohio Valley Wrestling and Women's Extreme Wrestling. She is known for starring in the 2015 horror anthology film Volumes of Blood.

== Professional wrestling career ==
=== Ohio Valley Wrestling (2006–2008) ===
Jonah originally pursued a career in professional wrestling because she "thought it looked fun". Her extensive theater and sports background made wrestling an obvious choice. After completing her English degree, she moved to Louisville to train. She made her debut at the March 18, 2006 Ohio Valley Wrestling (OVW) house show from Shepherdsville, Kentucky, teaming with Cherry to defeat Serena Deeb. A month later, at a house show in Austin, Indiana, Jonah lost to Beth Phoenix by disqualification when Shelly Martinez came out and attacked Phoenix. She made her OVW television debut in the spring of 2006, managing Mike Mizanin and playing the role of Mizanin's girlfriend. The May 10 TV tapings featured Jonah and Mizanin defeating the combo of Seth Skyfire and Shelly Martinez after Beth Phoenix interfered. The Miz's was then called up to WWE's main roster. Jonah continued in WEW for a while, where she still holds the tag team title to this day, with Cyndi Snow. Eventually, she went on to start a career in film. Occasionally, Jonah still wrestles for fun.

=== Women's Extreme Wrestling ===
On July 12, 2007 Jonah, along with Principle Lazarus, aka Cyndi "Bobcat", captured the Women's Extreme Wrestling (WEW) Tag Team Title by defeating Amy Zidian and Annie Social. They successfully defended the straps at WEW's "Tit For Tat" show against the makeshift duo of Becky Bayless and Lucy Furr. On July 21, 2008 the duo yet again successfully defended their WEW tag team title, against the team of Amy Lee and Annie Social at the "Locker Room Lust" show.

== Personal life ==
Jonah designed all of Kelly Kelly's Extreme Exposé gear, Shelly Martinez's gimmick attire while she was in World Wrestling Entertainment, and all of her own attire used in OVW. At one point, she had an online clothing store.

Jonah has an English degree with a minor in theater.

== Film career ==
Jonah started a new course in entertainment with film making. Roni landed in the top 3 actresses for a nationwide contest held by massify.com and After Dark Films in search of talent for the film Perkins 14.

Roni teamed with fellow massify contestant and Kentucky actor Jason Crowe to co-write, star and direct the feature film The Legacy where Jonah also did all the SPFX work. Soon after Jonah and Crowe began work on another film entitled Hell House. In it, Jonah re-claimed her role as Suicide Betty from The Legacy. Jonah co-wrote, starred and created all SPFX for Hell House.

Jonah has also written and directed two short film entitled Trepan and Malfunction. Roni has been involved in several additional projects in various capacities, including Little Sex Shop of Horrors, Girl/Girl Scene, Swordbearer, Truth or Dare V: Deadly Dares, and Old Days. Jonah's SPFX work can also be seen in the new film Red River.

Roni is in post production on her first feature film The Zombie Movie, due out by Christmas 2014

Since 2010, Jonah has been a series regular in Tucky Williams' web series Girl/Girl Scene.

Jonah will appear in the horror film Victim alongside Jordan Danyluk.

Recently, Roni co-wrote and co-starred in the movie, Selling Stupid, alongside Director and co-writer, Tonia Carrier.

Jonah is currently appearing as Jenna in the fantasy series Dagger Kiss, created by Tucky Williams, her co-star in Girl/Girl Scene.

In 2015, Jonah starred in the 2015 horror anthology film, Volumes of Blood. The film has received critical acclaim, and Jonah's performance earned her an award at the 2015 Mayday Film Festival for "Best Actress in a Feature."

Jonah is set to co-star in the independent horror feature film, The Bloody Man, alongside A Nightmare on Elm Street 4: The Dream Master stars, Lisa Wilcox and Tuesday Knight. The cast launched a successful Kickstarter campaign, and the film is slated for release in 2019.

== Championships and accomplishments ==
- Women's Extreme Wrestling
  - WEW Tag Team Championship (1 time) - with Principal Lazarus
