= IYF =

IYF may refer to:

== Events ==
- International Istanbul Youth Forum, an annual conference at Robert College, Istanbul, Turkiye
- International Year of Freshwater (2003), see List of environmental dates
- International Youth Forum at the World Youth Day 1995

== Groups, organizations, businesses ==
- International Youth Federation, the youth division of the U.N. International Union for Conservation of Nature and Natural Resources (IUCN); see History of youth work
- iShares Dow Jones US Financial (stock ticker: IYF); see List of American exchange-traded funds

== Other uses ==
- "I.Y.F.", a song by Believer from the 1987 mixtape The Return, featured on the 1990 album Sanity Obscure

== See also ==
- LYF
