= For the Incomplete =

Studio album by Soul Embraced
- Released: 2001
- Genres: Thrash metal, Christian metal
- Length: 48:01
- Labels: Clenched Fist, Blood & Ink
- Producers: Nathan Ritter, Rocky Gray

Soul Embraced chronology
The Fleshless (1999)	For the Incomplete (2001)	This Is My Blood (2002)

Re-release album cover

Professional ratings
Review scores
Source	Rating
New Release Tuesday	5/5 stars
Metal Crypt	4/5 stars
The Phantom Tollbooth	4.5/5 stars

For the Incomplete is the debut studio album by the metal band Soul Embraced. Tracks 8–11 are featured on The Fleshless EP.

== Critical reception ==
Christian Renner of Metal Crypt writes: "Overall this simply some very well done thrash metal with some death metal influences and if you can look past the slightly annoying snare drum sound you will really like this. Highly Recommended." Josh Spencer from The Phantom Tollbooth writes: "Alrighty then. It's the voice of God's vengeance, rarely heard anymore. The other songs aren't quite so bloodthirsty, but uphold the traditionally dark yet evangelical lyrics of Christian metal of the past, ala Vengeance Rising, old Living Sacrifice, Mortification, Believer, etc. Though most of their predecessors are now fallen, Soul Embraced step up to fill the gap, bringing mighty music of war against the devil, the flesh, and the world."

== Track listing ==
No.	Title	Length
1.	"Unborn"	3:31
2.	"Screams Unseen"	4:31
3.	"Ascend Into Thy Embrace"	2:59
4.	"My Tourniquet"	4:23
5.	"Forgiveness in Solitude"	4:38
6.	"Devour Gomorrah"	2:59
7.	"Exhumed"	4:16
8.	"Suffer No More"	3:37
9.	"Cleansed"	4:24
10.	"Separation"	2:28
11.	"Fleshless"	3:39

Blood and Ink Re-release
No.	Title	Length
12.	"Without Sight"	2:15
13.	"Bloodwashed"	4:19

== Credits ==
Soul Embraced

- Chad Moore - Vocals
- Rocky Gray - Lead guitar, bass, backing vocals
- Charlie T. West - Rhythm guitar
- Lance Garvin - Drums

Production

- Dave Quiggle - Artwork
- Nathan Ritter - Recording, mixing, engineer, producer
- Patrick (68) - Mastering

Artwork

- David Southerland - Design
- Redbeard - Other [Tattoos]
