= Every Knee Shall Bow =

American Christian metal band

- Every Knee Shall Bow performing at Audiofeed Festival 2016

Background information
- Also known as: EKSB
- Origin: Blevins, Arkansas, U.S.
- Genres: Christian metal; metalcore,
- Years active: 2008–present
- Labels: Rottweiler
- Members: Drew Wibblesman; Shane Wibblesman; DJ Wibblesman; Cole Wibblesman; Chris Hull
- Past members: Luke Carlson; Tanner Ramsey
- Website: Every Knee Shall Bow on Facebook

Every Knee Shall Bow is an independent Christian metal band that consists of brothers guitarists Drew and Cole, bassist Shane, drummer DJ Wibblesman, and returning vocalist Chris Hull. The band's debut EP was mixed by Rocky Gray of Living Sacrifice, Evanescence, and Machina. The band was recommended in an interview with Gray and Jon Dunn of Soul Embraced about the local Arkansas metal scene. Their debut album was released on March 12, 2013. It was produced by Josh Barber (Norma Jean, Hands, Colossus).

== History ==
The band started in 2002 with the older brothers, Drew and DJ Wibblesman, (at the time ages, 16 and 11). In 2008, their younger brothers Cole and Shane (ages 9 and 8) joined them, when the band officially formed. Tanner Ramsey was a part of the band in 2008 until 2010, when vocalist Chris Hull joined in November 2010.

The band recorded their debut EP in 2012, which was mixed by Rocky Gray of Living Sacrifice. In 2013, the band recorded their debut album, Slayers of Eden, which was produced by Josh Barber (Norma Jean, Hands, Your Memorial) and released through Rottweiler Records. In 2014 they toured with Abated Mass of Flesh. Hull left the band later in October. and was replaced by Luke Carlson. Carlson left the band in 2015, to get married. The band left Rottweiler Records in early 2016. On November 6, 2018, the band released their first single since their debut in 2013, five years later, with the track "Birth".

== Members ==
As of 2015

- Drew Wibblesman – lead guitar, clean vocals (since 2002)
- Cole Wibblesman – rhythm guitar (since 2008)
- Shane Wibblesman – bass (since 2008)
- DJ Wibblesman – drums (since 2002)
- Chris Hull – lead vocals (2010–2014, since 2015)

Former

- Tanner Ramsey – lead vocals (2008-2010)
- Luke Carlson – lead vocals (2014–2015)

Timeline

== Discography ==
Studio albums

- Slayers of Eden (March 12, 2013; Rottweiler)

EPs

- Weary Warriors (March 23, 2012; Rottweiler)

Singles

- "Birth" (November 6, 2018)
- "Rise" (August 18, 2020)
