= Mythos (Soul Embraced album) =

Studio album by Soul Embraced
- Released: July 9, 2013
- Genre: Death metal, Christian metal, heavy metal
- Length: 35:01
- Label: Rottweiler
- Producer: Rocky Gray, Shawn Browning

Soul Embraced chronology
| Dead Alive (2008) | Mythos (2013) |

Professional ratings
Review scores
| Source | Rating |
|---|---|
| HM Magazine | 4/5 stars |
| Indie Vision Music | 4.4 stars on a 5 point scale |

Mythos is the fifth album by the Christian metal band, Soul Embraced. It is the first album to feature Cody Smith and Jon Dunn.

== Critical reception ==
John Magelssen from Indie Vision Music says: "Soul Embraced have shown their ferocity and growth over the past fifteen years and are releasing their new full-length album Mythos on Tuesday, July 9th 2013. This is a great album and will please the ears as well as the soul with its hard-hitting death metal riffs to their heavy breakdowns. If you have the time or money, this record is well worth listening to."

Michael Larson from HM Magazine said: "Soul Embraced are back with a vengeance. Mythos is their fifth album and, arguably, their best to date. This month, there have been some great releases, but I did not expect Soul Embraced to be one of them. First off, everything on this album is solid. Vocalist Chad Moore seems to have improved over time, and then, they have these supremely placed guest vocals. The most notable thing about this album is that Rocky Gray is no longer playing guitar, but is instead behind the drums. Cody Smith is now handling the guitar duties. This works great, and the album has some amazing riffs, which are what make it work. The riffs and songwriting feel right, there are some classic SE moments, and now there are new SE moments where they show that they have stepped up their game and come out slugging with a fury."

== Track listing ==
| No. | Title | Length |
|---|---|---|
| 1. | "They Live, We Sleep" | 3:51 |
| 2. | "Awaken the Catalyst" | 4:00 |
| 3. | "Transhuman" (featuring Bruce Fitzhugh of Living Sacrifice) | 5:04 |
| 4. | "Like a Corpse" | 3:02 |
| 5. | "Luciferian Alliance" (Feat. Chris Hull of Every Knee Shall Bow) | 3:01 |
| 6. | "Perversion of the Cross" | 3:52 |
| 7. | "Heartbroken Reaper" | 3:59 |
| 8. | "Counterfeit Gospel" | 5:06 |
| 9. | "The Invocation" | 3:06 |

== Credits ==
Soul Embraced

- Jon Dunn – bass
- Rocky Gray – drums, engineering, mastering, mixing, production
- Chad Moore – vocals
- Cody Smith – guitar

Additional musicians

- Jeremiah Scott (Demon Hunter) – guitar
- Bruce Fitzhugh (Living Sacrifice) – guest vocals on track 3
- Chris Hull (Every Knee Shall Bow) – guest vocals on track 5

Production

- Shawn Browning – executive producer
- Paul Stier – layout

Art

- Travis Smith – artwork, cover art
