= Rocky Gray =

American musician

- Also known as: Rocky
- Born: William Caldwell Gray; July 2, 1974 (age 52); Jacksonville, Arkansas, U.S.
- Genre: Christian metal
- Occupations: Musician, songwriter
- Instruments: Drums, guitar
- Website: rocky-gray.com

William Caldwell "Rocky" Gray (born July 2, 1974) is an American drummer and guitarist. He is a guitarist for the bands Living Sacrifice, Even Devils Die, and Creepy Carnival, and the drummer for Soul Embraced, Mourningside, Machina, and We Are the Fallen. He played drums for Evanescence from 2003–2007 and Fatal Thirteen from 2006–2014, and was a guitarist for Shredded Corpse (1991–1998) and Solus Deus (2012–2017). Gray also released a solo album titled Accursed (2015).

== History ==
Gray joined the grindcore band Shredded Corpse, performing bass and vocals on all recordings. The band released two albums and eventually disbanded in 1998. In 1997, he formed Soul Embraced with David Sroczynski, and the band broke up in 1998. From 1991 to 1998, Gray played for many bands, with Shredded Corpse being his main gig. In 1998, he joined the Christian death metal band Living Sacrifice with Arthur Green and Matthew Putman.

In 1999, Gray reunited Soul Embraced with his brother-in-law Chad Moore and Living Sacrifice member Lance Garvin, and the band released their debut EP, The Fleshless. In 2000, Living Sacrifice released their fifth album, The Hammering Process, which was Gray, Green and Putman's first release with the band. The following year, Soul Embraced released their debut studio album, For the Incomplete. In 2002, Gray formed the band Kill System with Garvin, Moore, and John LeCompt. Kill System recorded their debut self-titled album. In early 2003, Gray played drums live for the rock band Evanescence, whose debut album, Fallen, featured a cover of Soul Embraced's song "My Tourniquet", which Gray co-wrote. He was replaced in Kill System by Cory Brandan Putman and the band disbanded that year.

After Gray left Living Sacrifice, Soul Embraced released their album Immune. In 2005, Gray got together with Garvin and Bruce Fitzhugh to record three additional songs for Living Sacrifice's greatest hits, In Memoriam. Later that year, Gray joined LeCompt in the band Machina. Gray also launched a clothing line called CrimeWave Clothing. In 2006, Gray joined the horror-themed band Fatal Thirteen (also stylized as Fatal 13) as the drummer. He also formed his own solo project, 3 for Sorrow, and another project with his brother-in-law, called The Burning. Both projects ended almost as abruptly they started. Gray stated that The Burning was put aside as he was focusing on other projects. In 2007, Gray left Evanescence.

After five years of being disbanded, Living Sacrifice reunited and released their 2008 sophomore EP, Death Machine, and their fourth album, Dead Alive. In 2009, Gray and LeCompt joined ex-Evanescence guitarist Ben Moody, former American Idol singer Carly Smithson and bassist Marty O'Brien) to form the band We Are the Fallen. In 2010, Living Sacrifice released their seventh album The Infinite Order. In 2012, Gray produced an EP by the local band Every Knee Shall Bow. The band then signed to Rottweiler Records, and Soul Embraced signed them soon after. Gray joined Solus Deus after they debuted. They released their debut self-titled EP in 2012, and their second EP, The Bloodtrail in 2013. In 2013, both Living Sacrifice and Soul Embraced released the albums Ghost Thief and Mythos.

In 2014, Fatal Thirteen broke up. Gray then worked on three other projects: Creepy Carnival, which he formed with Wretched Graverobber and Spano Graverobber of the horror punk band Grave Robber, and Jeff Bowie of Mourningside and Soul Embraced; Even Devils Die, another project with LeCompt; and a solo project under Gray's own name. In 2015, Gray composed the score for the horror film The Barn and the video game based on the film, and recorded a solo album, titled Accursed. Two tracks by Gray appeared on the soundtrack for the video game Killing Floor 2 (2016). Gray stated that he wanted Living Sacrifice and Soul Embraced to have a new release by 2016. In 2016, Gray was nominated for a "Best Scorer" award for his work on The Barn. Later that year, alongside longtime friend LeCompt, he joined the Arkansas band Cryptic Memoirs. Gray composed music for the horror films 10/31 (2017), 10/31 Part III (2023), and Cryptids (2023).

== Bands ==
Current

- Rocky Gray (solo) – guitars, drums, bass (2014–present)
- Soul Embraced – lead guitar (1997–2009, 2014–present), rhythm guitar (1997–2006, 2014–present), bass (1997–2006), drums (2009–2014), backing vocals (1999–present)
- Mourningside – drums (2004–present)
- Living Sacrifice – lead guitar, backing vocals (1998–2003, 2005, 2008–present)
- Machina – drums (2005–present)
- Even Devils Die – guitar, keyboards, programming (2014–present)
- Creepy Carnival – guitar (2014–present)
- Cryptic Memoirs – drums, guitar (2013–present)
- Dust & Blood - drums (2025-present)

Former

- Chalice – drums (1991)
- Shredded Corpse – vocals, guitar, keyboards, bass (1991–1998)
- Sickshine – drums (1993–1995)
- PainGod (later known as Flesh Compressor) – (1994–1995)
- Seminal Death – vocals, guitar (1995)
- Thy Pain – guitar, vocals (2002)
- Kill System – guitar (2002–2003)
- Evanescence – drums (2005–2007; touring drummer 2003–2005)
- The Burning – guitar (2005–2006)
- 3 for Sorrow – drums, bass and guitar (2005–2006)
- Fatal Thirteen – drums (2006–2014)
- We Are the Fallen – drums (2009–2012)
- Solus Deus – lead guitar, backing vocals (2012–2017)

Touring

- Bleeding Through – drums (2008)
- The Killer and the Star – drums (2009–present)

Timeline

== Selected discography ==
With Soul Embraced

- The Fleshless (1999)
- For the Incomplete (2000)
- This Is My Blood (2002)
- Immune (2003)
- Dead Alive (2008)
- Mythos (2013)

With Living Sacrifice

- The Hammering Process (2000)
- Subtle Alliance (2002)
- Conceived in Fire (2002)
- In Memoriam (2005)
- Death Machine (2008)
- The Infinite Order (2010)
- Ghost Thief (2013)

With Evanescence

- The Open Door (2006)

With Kill System

- Kill System (2002)

With Machina

- Machina EP (2007)
- To Live And Die in the Garden of Eden (2012)

With We Are the Fallen

- Tear the World Down (2010)

With Solus Deus

- Solus Deus (2012)
- The Bloodtrail (2014)
- The Plague (2016)

As Rocky Gray

- Accursed (2015)

With Cryptic Memoirs

- Weight of the World EP (2017)

As scorer

- The Barn (2015)

Other credits

- Inner War – Inner War (producer, 1999)
- Thy Pain – More Than Suffering (producer, 2002)
- Fatal Thirteen – Music From the Soundproof Torture Chamber (producer, 2006)
- Austrian Death Machine – Double Brutal (guitar solo on track 13, 2009)
- Believer – Gabriel (guitars, 2009)
- At Wars End – Take Off the Mask (producer, 2012)
- Every Knee Shall Bow – Weary Warrior (producer, 2012)
- Project 86 – Wait for the Siren (drums, 2012)
- Lust Control – Tiny Little Dots (mixing, mastering, 2013)
- Final Surrender – Empty Graves (producer, 2013)
- Abated Mass of Flesh – Brutal Death (mastering, 2013)
- At Wars End – One Way Ticket EP (producer, 2014)
- Lindsay Schoolcraft - Martyr (drum programming, guitar, bass, songwriting, 2018)
