= Solus Deus =

American death metal band

- Also known as: SD
- Origin: California and Arkansas, United States
- Genres: Death metal, deathcore, metalcore, thrash metal
- Years active: 2012-2017
- Label: EMP
- Members: Jey Collins; Rocky Gray; Wayne Miller; Kevin Garcia; Austin D'Amond
- Website: www.SolusDeus.com

Solus Deus was a death metal supergroup project from Orange County, California, United States. All of its musicians have been in other bands, such as Bleed the Sky, Living Sacrifice, Chimaira, Time Spent Burning, The Elite, and Once to Die. The band's name means "Only God", which vocalist Jey Collins says is personal to him. Other band members have their own personal beliefs. However, Solus Deus does not claim to be a religious band. In 2016, the band signed to EMP Underground, and Imprint of Dave Ellefson's (ex-Megadeth) label, EMP Label Group, who have a distributing deal through eOne.

== History ==
Solus Deus started in 2012 with vocalist Jey Collins and guitarist Wayne Miller. The members recruited Miller's former Bleed the Sky bandmate, drummer Austin D'Amond; their friend, bassist Tony Aiello; and guitarist Rocky Gray. The band released their debut EP soon after forming.

In late 2013, the band released their sophomore EP, The Bloodtrail.

In 2016, the band announced they had signed to Dave Ellefson's EMP Label Group and were releasing a new EP. Shortly after signing, bassist Tony Aiello left the band for personal reasons. He was replaced by Kevin Garcia. The band soon released a single titled "Immovable" and announced the name for the EP, The Plague. It also featured guest vocalist Darryl McDaniels, from rap group Run DMC, on a track entitled "Anacrime." The band stated in an interview that there would be a full-length album in 2017. The EP was released on February 17, 2017. Shortly after, vocalist Jey Collins parted ways with Solus Deus for personal reasons. Remaining members Wayne Miller, Kevin Garcia and Austin D’Amond decided to recruit vocalist Noah Robinson and reform the band Bleed The Sky. D'Amond also currently plays with Chimaira, with Gray continuing his bands and projects including Living Sacrifice and Soul Embraced.

== Members ==
Former members

- Jey Collins - vocals (2012–2017)
- Rocky Gray - lead guitar, backing vocals (2012–2017)
- Wayne Miller - rhythm guitar (2012–2017)
- Kevin Garcia - bass and guitar (2016–2017)
- Austin D'Amond - drums (2012–2017)
- Tony Aiello - bass (2012-2016)

== Discography ==
EPs

- Solus Deus (2012)
- The Bloodtrail (2013)
- The Plague (2017)

Other songs

- "Regulate" (2014; originally performed by Warren G)
- "Immoveable" (2016)

Music videos

- "The Bloodtrail" (2013)
- "Ride Or Die" (2014)
- "Horror Of Nothingness" (2015)
