= Cryptids (film) =

American anthology horror film

- Promotional release poster by Marc Schoenbach
- Directed by: Brett DeJager; Zane Hershberger; Max Groah; John William Holt; Robert Kuhn; Billy Pon; Justin M. Seaman
- Produced by: Justin M. Seaman; Zane Hershberger; P. J. Starks
- Starring: Joe Bob Briggs
- Music by: Rocky Gray
- Production companies: Silver Springs Films; Nevermore Production Films
- Distributed by: Scream Team Releasing
- Release date: August 19, 2023 (H2F2)
- Country: United States
- Language: English

Cryptids is a 2023 American anthology horror comedy film produced by Justin M. Seaman, Zane Hershberger, and P. J. Starks. It stars Joe Bob Briggs as a talk radio host who decides to discuss the topic of cryptozoology, prompting listeners to call in and relay stories about cryptids. The film includes segments directed by Brett DeJager, Zane Hershberger, Max Groah, John William Holt, Robert Kuhn, Billy Pon, and Justin M. Seaman.

Cryptids premiered at the HorrorHound Film Festival (H2F2) in Indianapolis, Indiana, on August 19, 2023. The film is set to be released on Blu-ray, DVD, and VHS by Scream Team Releasing in March 2024.

== Premise ==
Cryptids takes place in a radio station during a show called The Truth Serum, hosted by Major Harlan Dean. On tonight's episode, Harlan decides to tackle the topic of cryptozoology, but as the phone lines light up and the calls come in, each caller's story becomes increasingly bizarre, and Harlan starts to question if real dangers are lurking outside the station.

— Rue Morgue

== Cast ==
The cast includes:

- Joe Bob Briggs as Major Harlan Dean
- Bianca Allaine
- Sable Griedel
- Sé Marie
- Daniel Kiely
- Chad Bruns
- Wayne W. Johnson
- Cortland Woodard
- Aaron Steadman
- Allan Regimball
- Esau Ramirez

== Production ==
Director and producer Justin M. Seaman met Joe Bob Briggs at Scarefest 2018 in Lexington, Kentucky, leading Briggs to be cast in the role of Major Harlan Dean.

Funding for Cryptids began in 2013. Seaman planned to launch a crowdfunding campaign on Indiegogo to help finance the film in March 2020, but postponed it due to the outbreak of the COVID-19 pandemic, noting that "we decided it wasn't the best time to be asking for funds." The Indiegogo campaign was eventually launched in July 2020.

In January 2022, producer P. J. Starks stated that, according to co-producer Zane Hershberger, "they're finishing up the editing process on a couple of the segments. He's aiming to release the movie in summer of 2022."

== Release ==
Cryptids premiered at the HorrorHound Film Festival (H2F2) in Indianapolis, Indiana, on August 19, 2023. It later screened at the Nightmares Film Festival in Ohio on October 28, 2023.

The film is set to be released on Blu-ray, DVD, and VHS by Scream Team Releasing in March 2024.

== See also ==
- Impact of the COVID-19 pandemic on cinema
