= Dimensions (Believer album) =

Studio album by Believer
- Released: 1993
- Genre: Technical thrash metal, progressive metal
- Length: 52:42
- Label: Roadrunner; R.E.X. Records
- Producer: The Trauma Team with Ted Hermanson

Believer chronology
Sanity Obscure (1990)	Dimensions (1993)	Gabriel (2009)

Alternative cover
- R.E.X. Records

Dimensions is the third album by the American Christian thrash metal band Believer, released in 1993 on both Roadrunner Records and R.E.X. Records. The album's last song, "Trilogy of Knowledge", is split into four separate parts and tells of the life of Jesus Christ. The lyrics recount events from the Bible (often expressed in first person), and include opera vocals, orchestral instruments, acoustic guitars, distorted guitars, and more. Although the album was critically lauded, the band disbanded the following year, but reformed in 2005.

== Recording ==
The pre-production of Dimensions was recorded at Trauma Studios, and was produced by The Trauma Team and Ted Hermanson who did the engineering, assisted by the drummer Joey Daub. Wyatt Robertson and David Baddorf left Believer before the band began recording Dimensions. Jim Winters joined as bassist and also played some guitar parts during the recording sessions. On this album, Glenn Fischbach played cello, Scott Laird played violins and violas, and Julianne Laird Hoge performed soprano vocals. During the recording, the band members would assign a time signature to a set of dice and would write a part in that signature if they were stuck. The album was mastered at The Hit Factory, DMS, New York, by Chris Gehringer. The cover art and illustration was done by Dave McKean.

The album was released in 1993 and turned out to be the band's most technical, progressive, and ambitious album. Both Roadrunner Records and R.E.X. Records released it with a different cover art.

The lyrics on Dimensions deal with philosophy. For example, on the song "Dimentia" the lyrics deal with the philosophical paradoxes and the ponderings of Sigmund Freud, Thomas J. J. Altizer, Ludwig Feuerbach and Jean-Paul Sartre about the existence of God. The song specifically quotes Altizer's The Gospel of Christian Atheism, Sartre's Being and Nothingness, Feuerbach's The Essence of Christianity, and Freud's Dialogues Concerning Natural Religion.

The symphonic metal suite "Trilogy of Knowledge", divided to three chapters and an intro, is an over 20 minute epic and Biblical story about life of Jesus Christ and knowledge of good and evil. "Trilogy of Knowledge" once again featured the orchestral compositions of Scott Laird and soprano vocals by Julianne Laird Hoge.

== Reception ==
Professional ratings
Review scores
Source	Rating
Phantom Tollbooth	5/5 stars
Cross Rhythms	10/10 squares
Matt Morrow	90/100

While some fans preferred Sanity Obscure over Dimensions, the critics considered Dimensions as the album that separated Believer from average thrash metal groups, and praised the album's musical output. Tom MacMillan of The Phantom Tollbooth claims that "Believer's last offering to the musical world proved a metal classic" and "Dimensions is one of the greatest progressive metal albums of all time." Rating the album 5/5, MacMillan writes:

Believer were masters at molding emotion and developing mood in songwriting. Immediately, the band stands out. The vocals are excellent, well-performed, and not as unpleasant as one might think growling to be. The lead guitar parts, performed by Kurt Bachman, are amazing; unrestrained without being pompous. Jim Winters matches the skill and precision of Bachman in a similar way with his bass guitar.

Matt Anderson of Cross Rhythms also gave the album a perfect score, concluding that Dimensions was "A brilliant album. Only Believer could have dreamt up such an album." AllMusic highlighted the 20-minute "Trilogy of Knowledge."

Jeff Wagner stated in the book Mean Deviation: Four Decades of Progressive Heavy Metal that "as tech metal albums go, it is a masterpiece of frigid guitar tones, warped riffs, and constant tempo changes," and "with Dimensions, Believer had borne a dense, challenging monolith of progressive metal that has few equals, even years later."

== Track listing ==
1. "Gone" (K. Bachman/ J. Winters) – 5:47
2. "Future Mind" (K. Bachman/ J. Daub/ J. Winters)- 5:34
3. "Dimentia" (K.Bachman/ J. Daub/ J.Winters/ D. Man)- 5:36
4. "What Is But Cannot Not Be" (K. Bachman/ J. Daub/ J.Winters/ D. Man) – 5:28
5. "Singularity" (K.Bachman/ J.Winters/ D. Man) – 4:24
6. "No Apology" (K.Bachman/ J. Daub/ J.Winters/ D. Man/ D. Baddorf) – 4:55
7. "Trilogy of Knowledge: Intro: The Birth" – 2:17 (S. Laird/ K. Bachman/ J. Daub/ J. Winters)
8. "Trilogy of Knowledge: Movement I: The Lie" – 5:27 (S. Laird/ K. Bachman/ J. Daub/ J. Winters)
9. "Trilogy of Knowledge: Movement II: The Truth" – 6:46 (S. Laird/ K. Bachman/ J. Daub/ J. Winters)
10. "Trilogy of Knowledge: Movement III: The Key" – 6:21 (S. Laird/ K. Bachman/ J. Daub/ J. Winters)

== Personnel ==
Believer

- Kurt Bachman – vocals, guitar
- Joey Daub – drums, assistant engineer
- Jim Winters – bass, guitar

Additional musicians

- Scott Laird – violins, violas
- Glenn Fischbach – cello
- Julianne Laird Hoge – soprano
- William Keller – speaking voice

Production

- Ted Hermanson & The Trauma Team – production and engineering
- Chris Gerhinger – mastering
- Dave McKean – cover art (Roadrunner version)
