= Transhuman (album) =

Studio album by Believer
- Released: April 11, 2011
- Recorded: August–December 2010
- Genre: Progressive metal
- Label: Metal Blade
- Producer: The Trauma Team

Believer chronology
Gabriel (2009)	Transhuman (2011)

Professional ratings
Review scores
Source	Rating
About.com	4/5 stars
Blistering	7.5/10 stars
Cross Rhythms	8/10 squares
Decibel	2/10
Lords of Metal	92/100
Metal.de	9/10
Metal Hammer Germany	4/7
The Phantom Tollbooth	5/5 stars
Powermetal.de	8.50/10
SputnikMusic	4/5 stars

Transhuman is the fifth studio album by American thrash metal band Believer, released on April 11, 2011 on Metal Blade Records. It sees the band move into a more melodic, less thrashy direction.

== Overview ==
A concept album, the band stated that the lyrics deal with transhumanism, "The study of the ramifications, promises, and potential dangers of technologies that will enable us to overcome fundamental human limitations, and the related study of the ethical matters involved in developing and using such technologies." The band stated that the source of inspiration was Dr. Ginger Campbell's Brain Science Podcast, which explores recent discoveries in neuroscience, as well as Dr. Thomas Metzinger's scientific research and philosophical study of consciousness and the self.

Musically, the band stated that they "focused more on the overall musicality which included more instrumental layers than we used before." SputnikMusic noted that the band dropped most of the aggressive thrash metal elements in favor of more melodic, modern, mid-tempo and mechanical style. About.com reviewer wrote that the album's genre is difficult to pigeon hole, featuring elements of industrial, psychedelic and soundtrack music among technical metal.

== Track listing ==
1. Lie Awake – 5:03
2. G.U.T. - 3:39
3. Multiverse – 4:44
4. End of Infinity – 4:12
5. Transfection – 3:55
6. Clean Room – 4:50
7. Currents – 2:50
8. Traveler – 4:23
9. Ego Machine – 4:29
10. Being No One – 4:47
11. Entanglement – 4:15
12. Mindsteps – 6:52

== Personnel ==
Believer

- Kurt Bachman – vocals, guitar
- Joey Daub – drums
- Jeff King – keyboards, programming
- Kevin Leaman – guitar
- Elton Nestler – bass guitar, programming

Additional musicians

- Trav Turner – additional drums on "Lie Awake"
- Jim Thomas – guitar technician, main personnel, setup

Production

- Kevin "131" Gutierrez – additional production, mixing
- Joel DuBay – mixing assistant
- Maor Appelbaum – mastering engineer
- The Trauma Team – engineer

Design

- Tom Bejgrowicz – photography
- Kira Beth – model
- Tim Engle – photography
- Michael Rosner – design, layout, paintings
