= Extraction from Mortality =

Studio album by Believer
- Released: 1989
- Studio: Morning Star Studios in Spring House, Pennsylvania
- Genre: Christian metal, thrash metal
- Length: 41:39
- Label: R.E.X. Records
- Producer: Doug Mann

Believer chronology
The Return (1987)	Extraction from Mortality (1989)	Sanity Obscure (1990)

Professional ratings
Review scores
Source	Rating
Cross Rhythms	10/10 stars

Extraction from Mortality, also known as Extraction, is the debut studio album by the American Christian thrash metal band Believer. It was released on R.E.X. Records in 1989. In 2010, HM Magazine ranked it #33 on the Top 100 Christian metal albums of all-time list.

== Recording ==
In high school, the band leader Kurt Bachman met Scott Laird, who was studying his first year as a music instructor. When Believer was recording the title track for Extraction from Mortality, the band asked Laird to compose an orchestral intro for the song. In 1989, Believer was signed to R.E.X. Records which published Extraction from Mortality. The album was mostly distributed to Christian bookstores but quickly gained popularity for Believer. The album was noted for its technicality and aggression, and especially the song "Shadow of Death" is one of the all-time favorites among Believer fans. "Unite" starts with an intro that contains industrial music elements and bizarre sound samples. The last song, "Stress", is a humorous, laid-back tune that advises listeners not to worry about things they can not do anything about.

Extraction from Mortality gained notice among non-Christian metal fans, and Believer was signed to Roadrunner Records in 1990. However, R.E.X. Records would release Believer's later records to Christian market while Roadrunner's distribution was aimed at a broader audience.

An unreleased demo song titled "The Chosen" appeared on the compilation albums East Coast Metal in 1988 and Classic Metal in 1990. A remixed version of "Vile Hypocrisy" was included on the compilation album Argh!!! in 1991.

For years Extraction from Mortality was hard to find, and copies sold for high prices in internet auctions. A label called M8 re-issued the album in 2001, printing 2000 copies of it; this release contains the remixed version of "Vile Hypocrisy" and "The Chosen" demo song as bonus tracks. The print sold out soon after. In 2007, the Polish label Metal Mind Productions re-released Extraction from Mortality in a remastered digipak version with 2000 copies; this release does not have the two bonus tracks.

== Track listing ==
No.	Title	Length
1.	"Unite"	6:39
2.	"Vile Hypocrisy"	5:35
3.	"D.O.S. (Desolation of Sodom)"	4:19
4.	"Tormented"	3:50
5.	"Shadow of Death"	4:19
6.	"Blemished Sacrifices"	3:54
7.	"Not Even One"	3:33
8.	"Extraction from Mortality"	6:07
9.	"Stress"	3:01
Total length:		41:39

^{a} song re-recorded from The Return demo (1987)

2001 reissue bonus tracks
No.	Title	Length
10.	"The Chosen (Demo)"	4:07
11.	"Vile Hypocrisy (Remix)"	5:56
Total length:		51:42

== Personnel ==
Believer

- Kurt Bachman – vocals, guitars
- Dave Baddorf – guitars
- Howe Kraft – bass
- Joey Daub – drums

Additional musicians

- Scott Laird – violin, viola

Production

- Doug Mann – producer, mixer
- Paul Krueger – mixer
