= P.J. Starks =

American film director, producer, screenwriter & editor (born 1982)

- Born: March 25, 1982 (age 43); Owensboro, Kentucky, U.S.
- Occupations: Film director; producer; screenwriter; editor
- Children: 2

P.J. Starks (born March 25, 1982) is an American film director, producer, screenwriter, and editor. He is known for producing the 2015 anthology film Volumes of Blood, its 2016 sequel Volumes of Blood: Horror Stories, and the 2017 film 10/31. He is producing the upcoming films 13 Slays Till X-Mas and Cryptids.

== Early life and education ==
Starks was born in Owensboro, Kentucky, and attended Owensboro High School.

In 2018, Starks was an executive producer on e-Demon, Dracula’s Coffin, Angel, Maniac Farmer, and For the Love of the Boogeyman: 40 Years of Halloween, in which he is also featured. That same year, a Special KILLectors Edition Blu-ray of the original Volumes of Blood would be released through Scream Team Releasing. Starks can also be seen in the 2018 release of the VHS documentary Magnetic Highway: Exit 2.

The Volumes Of Blood franchise is set to be featured in two forthcoming horror compendium novels.

In 2020, Starks produced the film 13 Slays Till X-Mas alongside Eric Huskisson. Starks is also producing the films Cryptids and Devil's Knight: Volumes of Blood 3, which are both in development.

== Personal life ==
Starks lives in Owensboro with his two sons, Logan and Connor.
