= This Is My Blood =

Studio album by Soul Embraced
- Released: January 8, 2002
- Genres: Death metal, southern rock
- Label: Solid State Records
- Producers: Rocky Gray, Lance Garvin, Chad Moore

Soul Embraced chronology
For the Incomplete (2000)	This Is My Blood (2002)	Immune (2003)

This Is My Blood is the second studio album by the death metal band Soul Embraced.

== Critical reception ==
Professional ratings
Review scores
Source	Rating
AllMusic	3/5 stars
Cross Rhythms	8/10 squares
The Phantom Tollbooth	unrated

Awarding the album three stars at AllMusic, Tom Semioli writes, "In a genre that thrives on formula and repetition, Soul Embraced adds a welcome blast of soul on This Is My Blood." Marc Lungley, giving the album an eight out of ten from Cross Rhythms, states, "This has stamina to be a regular on the shelf of any metal fan." Writing for The Phanton Tollbooth, Duncann Tripp says, "Good listening all around."

== Track listing ==
No.	Title	Length
1.	"I Fade Away"	3:48
2.	"The Scorn of Death's Kiss"	4:13
3.	"Helpless in Wither"	3:07
4.	"Angels with Raven Hearts"	3:30
5.	"Evolver"	2:43
6.	"End What Has Begun"	2:23
7.	"Buried In"	2:51
8.	"The Cold Stares of Dead Eyes"	2:45
9.	"My Name Is Legion"	2:55
10.	"Scars Remain"	2:34
11.	"Still as You"	2:50
12.	"Kingdom of Shadows"	2:34
13.	"Leech"	3:34

== Credits ==
Soul Embraced

- Rocky Gray - Guitar, Bass, Backing Vocals, Mixing
- Lance Garvin - Drums
- Chad Moore - Lead Vocals

Additional Musicians

- Arthur Green - Bass
- John LeCompt - Guitar

Production

- Ray Brooks - Mixing, Engineer
- Brandon Ebel - Executive Producer
- Johnathan Parker - Engineer
- Brian Gardner - Mastering
- Roy Culver - A&R

Art

- Don Clark - Layout, Design
- Travis Smith - Artwork
- Reagan Karras - Photography
