= Dead Moon Rising =

- Directed by: Mark E. Poole
- Written by: Mark E. Poole
- Produced by: Janice Poole
- Starring: Jason Crowe; Mike Seely; Erica Goldsmith
- Cinematography: Mark E. Poole
- Edited by: Mark E. Poole
- Music by: Alan Grosheider
- Production company: Anubis Digital Studios
- Distributed by: Anthem Pictures
- Release date: May 1, 2007
- Running time: 93 minutes
- Country: United States
- Language: English
- Budget: $20,000

Dead Moon Rising is a 2007 horror film written and directed by Mark E. Poole. It stars Jason Crowe, Mike Seely, and Erica Goldsmith as locals who must fight waves of zombies in Louisville, Kentucky.

== Plot ==
An unexplained phenomenon causes a zombie pandemic. Jim and Nick, workers at a car rental service in Louisville, Kentucky, attempt to survive the zombie apocalypse. With the help of April, Dick, Vix, and several other friends and locals that they pick up along the way, the group makes its way through the city. Eventually, they manage to rally a large number of bikers, who proceed to fight the zombies in a thousand-person brawl.

== Cast ==
- Jason Crowe as Jim
- Mike Seely as Nick
- Erica Goldsmith as April
- Gary Williams as Dick
- Tucky Williams as Vix
- Derek Miller as Albert

== Production ==
Poole, who was influenced by Shaun of the Dead and 28 Days Later, shot the film in Louisville, Kentucky. When The Courier-Journal ran a story about the film, Poole was inundated with locals who volunteered to appear as extras in the film. The climactic zombie fight was recognized by the Guinness World Records as the largest zombie scene filmed. Poole also received an offer for free helicopter service.

== Release ==
The film premiered in Louisville on May 1, 2007. It was released on DVD on March 4, 2008.

== Reception ==
Brian McNail of Brutal as Hell wrote, "Dead Moon Rising is by far one of the worst filmed, acted, special effects-enhanced movies I have seen in a LONG time." Peter Dendle wrote that the film may be meaningful to Louisville residents but will not appeal to anyone else.

Dead Moon Rising was selected as Best Zombie Film at Fright Night Film Fest and Best Feature at Cine-Fest, both in 2007. Fangoria selected it as its top video rental for May 2008.
