= Kayden Kross =

American pornographic film actress (born 1985)

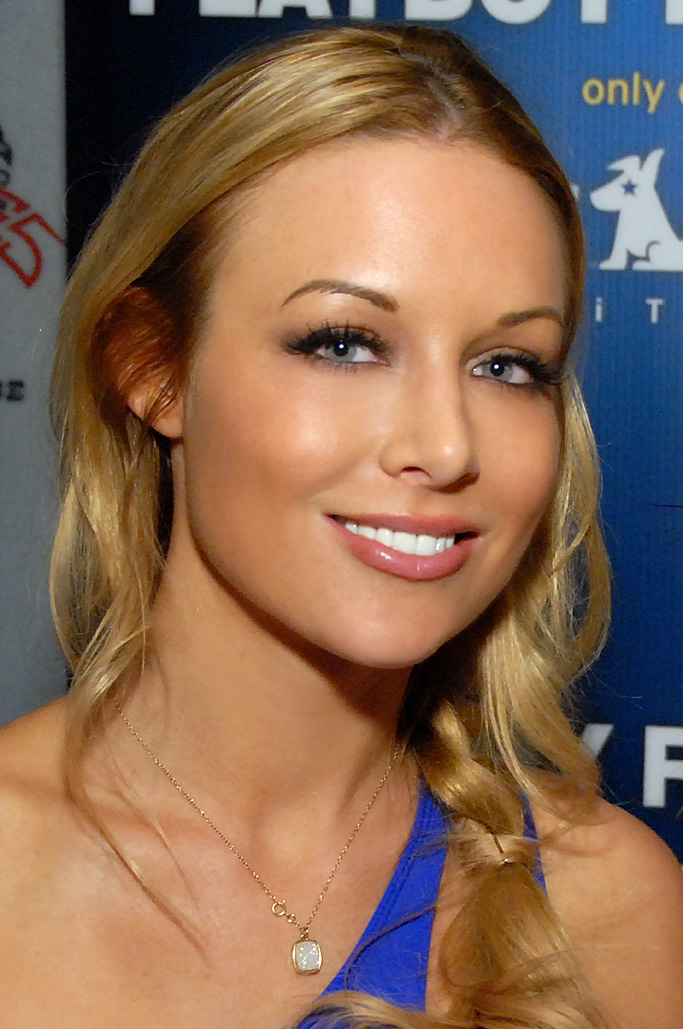
- Kross in 2013
- Born: 1985 (age 40–41); Sacramento, California, U.S.
- Education: California State University, Sacramento
- Occupations: Pornographic film actress; director
- Partner: Manuel Ferrara
- Children: 1
- Website: clubkayden.com

Kayden Kross (born 1985) is an American pornographic film actress and director. She is a member of the AVN and XRCO Halls of Fame.

== Early life ==
Born in Sacramento, California, Kross grew up in the foothills between Sacramento and Placerville in a strict, religious household. She has described herself as a "book nerd" in high school. Kross and her younger sister were raised by their mother; their father left the family before Kross was 5 years old, placing their mother in financial hardship. When she was 18, Kross began working as a stripper at Rick's Showgirls in Rancho Cordova, California, where she had been a waitress. Her intention was to earn enough to rescue an injured pony she had worked with from being slaughtered, but later found that she enjoyed the job. Kross studied psychology and philosophy at California State University, Sacramento.

== Career ==
Her movies with Vivid included Kayden's First Time, Hard Time, and Be Here Now. Unhappy with the company, she became a free agent one year later when she did not renew her contract. She signed an exclusive contract with Adam & Eve after one month of being a free agent.

She was named Penthouse Pet of the Month for September 2008. Kross' official website, ClubKayden.com, was launched on September 2, 2008. Kross has hosted a blog at UnKrossed.com and has written regular updates and opinion columns for MikeSouth.com, an adult industry gossip blog, among other sites.

Kross became exclusive to Digital Playground under a multi-year contract on January 1, 2010. Her first movie with the company, The Smiths, topped sales charts immediately and has continued to be a best seller. She was given the lead in their big budget feature, Body Heat, in her third month of the contract. She won two Best Actress Awards for the role.

Kross hosted the 2010 AVN Awards show, along with porn actress Kirsten Price and comedian Dave Attell. She was Penthouse magazine's "Cover Girl" for September 2008 and 2010.

Kross was named by CNBC as one of the 12 most popular pornographic film actresses in 2011.

In 2012, she hosted the Xbiz awards for the second time, and appeared in the ceremony alongside Wicked Pictures/Wicked.com contract star, Jessica Drake, and on the AVN red carpet with co-hosts Jesse Jane and guitarist Dave Navarro.

In 2019, she launched Deeper, one of the Vixen Media Group's primary websites in its portfolio.

=== Appearances in other media ===
Kross has made appearances in FX's comedy series The League, the G4 reality series The Block, and Family Jewels.

In 2011, Kross co-hosted a regular videocast for Triggla TV titled Kayden's Review alongside the comedian Dane Hanson. From 2012 to 2013, Kross portrayed a main character in the second season of Tucky Williams' lesbian-themed web series Girl/Girl Scene. Starting in January 2013, Kross hosted the weekly call-in show Krossfire on Playboy Radio.

In 2013, Kross also appeared in the featurette "Chicks 'N Guns" on the Breaking Bad 5th season DVD as a stripper. The scene takes place during the season 5 episode "Gliding Over All". Kross also appeared in two music videos from the band Nekrogoblikon, "No One Survives" (2012) and "We Need a Gimmick" (2015).

=== Writing ===
Kross writes columns regularly for publications such as Complex magazine, XBIZ magazine, and a blog for Xcritic.com. She has also contributed to Timothy McSweeney's Internet Tendency, and her short story "Plank" appeared in the 2012 short story collection Forty Stories: New Writing from Harper Perennial, an e-book. As of August 2012, she was writing an autobiographical book about the porn industry.

=== Adult industry activism ===
In 2008, Kross was among those testifying against a proposed tax in California on all producers and distributors of adult entertainment. In 2014, she testified against a bill in the California State Assembly that would require pornographic film performers to wear condoms on set.

== Personal life ==
In July 2009, Kross pleaded no contest to charges of misdemeanor real estate fraud and was sentenced to one day in custody and three years of probation. Kross said she was persuaded to buy two properties that were in foreclosure by a broker who stood to profit from the transaction, but that there was no written contract. She blamed her involvement on naïveté and being scammed by the broker and mortgage lender.

Kross and her partner, French pornographic film actor Manuel Ferrara, have one daughter, born in January 2014. In 2013, Ferrara asked her to no longer perform with other men. Ferrara continued to shoot scenes with other women, occasionally scenes that were directed by Kross. They acknowledged the seeming double standard of their arrangement but agreed that his work would stay professional and that Kross maintained "veto" power over who performs with Manuel. He also stated that if she wished for him to stop performing altogether, he would.

== Awards ==
As a performer

Year	Award	Category	Film
2007	Adultcon	Top 20 Adult Actresses	—N/a
2008	NightMoves Award	Best Girl/Girl Release (Fan's Choice)	Bree & Kayden
2009	Hot d'Or	Best American Starlet	—N/a
2010	Erotixxx Award	Best U.S. Actress	—N/a
2010	NightMoves Award	Best Female Performer (Fan's Choice)	—N/a
2010	Venus Award	Best Actress International	—N/a
2011	AVN Award	Best All-Girl Group Sex Scene	Body Heat
2011	AVN Award	Wildest Sex Scene (Fan Award)	Body Heat
2011	XBIZ Award	Acting Performance of the Year (Female)	Body Heat
2012	AVN Award	Hottest Sex Scene (Fan Award)	Babysitters 2
2013	Sex Award	Favorite Sex Toy for Men	The Kayden Kross Fleshlight
2013	XBIZ Award	Best Scene – All-Girl	Mothers & Daughters
2014	XBIZ Award	Best Scene – Feature Movie	Code of Honor
2015	XBIZ Award	Best Scene – All-Girl	Misha Cross Wide Open
2019	AVN Award	Hall of Fame	—N/a
2022	XCritic Award	Best G/G Scene	Influence 2
2022	XRCO Award	Hall of Fame	—N/a

As a director

Year	Award	Category	Film
2015	XBIZ Award	Director of the Year – Non-Feature Release	Misha Cross Wide Open
2016	NightMoves Award	Best All Sex Release (Fan's Choice)	Kayden Kross' Casting Couch 3
2018	AVN Award	Best Director – Non-Feature	Sacrosanct
2019	AVN Award	Director of the Year	—N/a
2019	XBIZ Award	Director of the Year – Feature	—N/a
2019	Urban X Award	Director of the Year	—N/a
2019	NightMoves Award	Best Feature Director (Editor's Choice)	—N/a
2019	XRCO Award	Best Director – Features	—N/a
2019	Fleshbot Award	Director of the Year	—N/a
2020	AVN Award	Director of the Year	—N/a
2020	AVN Award	Best Director – Dramatic Production	Drive
2020	XBIZ Award	Director of the Year – Body of Work	—N/a
2020	NightMoves Award	Best Feature Director (Fan's Choice)	—N/a
2020	XRCO Award	Best Director – Features	—N/a
2020	XRCO Award	Best Director – Web	—N/a
2021	AVN Award	Director of the Year	—N/a
2021	AVN Award	Best Directing – Drama	Muse
2021	AVN Award	Best Screenplay – Drama	Muse
2021	XCritic Award	Best Director Feature	Muse
2021	XBIZ Award	Director of the Year	—N/a
2021	Fleshbot Award	Director of the Year	—N/a
2021	NightMoves Award	Best Feature Director (Fan's Choice)	—N/a
2021	XRCO Award	Best Director – Features	—N/a
2021	XRCO Award	Best Director – Non-Features	—N/a
2021	XRCO Award	Best Director – Web	—N/a
2022	XBIZ Award	Director of the Year	—N/a
2022	AVN Award	Best Directing – Narrative Production	Psychosexual
2022	Fleshbot Award	Director of the Year	—N/a
2022	XRCO Award	Best Director – Features	—N/a
2022	NightMoves Award	Best Feature Director	—N/a
2022	Doppio Senso Night Award	Best International Feature Movie	Drift
2023	AVN Award	Outstanding Director – Individual Work	Drift
2023	AVN Award	Best Directing – Narrative Production	—N/a
2023	XRCO Award	Best Director – Web	—N/a
2023	NightMoves Award	Best Non-Feature Director	—N/a
2024	AVN Award	Best Directing Portfolio – Narrative	—N/a
2024	NightMoves Award	Best Non-Feature Director	—N/a
2025	AVN Award	Best Directing Portfolio – Narrative	—N/a
2025	Adult Empire Award	Director of the Year	—N/a

== Mainstream filmography ==
Year	Title	Role
2012	Breaking Bad (bonus DVD feature "Chicks 'n' Guns")	Kristall
2013	Blue Dream	Tara
2014	The Hungover Games	Chastity the Topless Blonde
2015	Samurai Cop 2: Deadly Vengeance	Milena/Jennifer
2016	Enter the Samurai	Herself
2019	Verotika	Morella
