= Immune (album) =

Studio album by Soul Embraced
- Released: February 25, 2003
- Genres: Alternative metal, death metal, black metal
- Label: Solid State
- Producer: Barry Poynter

Soul Embraced chronology
This Is My Blood (2002)	Immune (2003)	Dead Alive (2008)

Immune is the third studio album by Soul Embraced, released on February 25, 2003.

== Critical reception ==
Professional ratings
Review scores
Source	Rating
AllMusic	3/5 stars
Cross Rhythms	7/10 squares
The Phantom Tollbooth	3/5
Jesus Freak Hideout	3.5/5 stars

Awarding the album three stars from AllMusic, Alex Henderson states, "his CD is an exciting demonstration of the fact that Soul Embraced does not govern by brute force alone." Andy Shaw, giving the album a seven out of ten for Cross Rhythms, describes, "Soul Embraced have managed to put something of a new twist into it." Rating the album a three out of five at The Phantom Tollbooth, writes, "Immune is a step in the right direction for Soul-Embraced." Joe Quinlan of Jesus Freak Hideout states, "To be honest, I felt the entire album sounded the same, empty and slow. After Soul Embraced's last album came out (Dead Alive), I'd listen to that release any day over Immune. Also, considering the album was recorded in 2003, most kids are too much into Underoath and August Burns Red these days to enjoy Immune."

== Track listing ==
No.	Title	Length
1.	"Immune to Emotion"	3:47
2.	"The Hero"	4:33
3.	"I Bury You"	3:43
4.	"Abandoned"	4:32
5.	"Someone Just Walked Across My Grave"	3:26
6.	"Someday"	4:09
7.	"Existence in Despair"	4:05
8.	"On Your Own"	3:32
9.	"Seems Like Forever" (featuring John LeCompt of Mindrage and Evanescence)	3:54
10.	"Shadow World"	3:19

== Credits ==
Soul Embraced

- Chad Moore - lead vocals
- Rocky Gray - guitar, bass, backing vocals
- Lance Garvin - drums

Additional musicians

- John LeCompt - guest vocals on track 9

Production

- Troy Glessner - mastering
- Jason Magnusson - engineer, mixing, producer
- Brian May - composer
- Brian Meredith - photography
- Barry Poynter - engineer, mixing, producer
