= Slayers of Eden =

Studio album by Every Knee Shall Bow
- Released: March 12, 2013
- Recorded: 2013
- Genres: Christian metal technical death metal
- Length: 42:07
- Label: Rottweiler
- Producer: Josh Barber

Every Knee Shall Bow chronology
Weary Warrior (2012)	Slayers of Eden (2013)

Professional ratings
Review scores
Source	Rating
New Transcendence	9.75/10 stars
Sputnik Music	3.8/5 stars
HM Magazine	2.5/5 stars
Indie Vision Music	3/5 stars

Slayers of Eden is the debut album by the Christian metal band, Every Knee Shall Bow. It was released on March 13, 2013, through Rottweiler Records.

== Critical reception ==
Bruce Moore writes:"This is sheer brutality in every sense of the word and I think it is a terrific debut from a band I am hoping to hear more from in the near future. I am certain fans of heavy metal music will eat this one up. Check it out I, think it is worth the spin." Connor Welsh writes:"True, faith is a touchy topic, especially in the scene surrounding heavy music. However, Every Knee Shall Bow cast their concerns aside and write nothing but catchy, technical and heavy—but faith driven—music with Slayers of Eden. Reaching out to the listener and detailing great scenes of war, famine, battle and redemption, this release is one which will captivate listeners of any value system and, if nothing else, compel them to hit the replay button countless times." Colin Simula writes:"This album feels like a good start. It's heavy and well-written. Just absolutely nothing new. I can tell these guys are capable of so much more. And I look forward to what they come up with next." John Magelssen writes:"This is a very strong metal album for such a diverse band and I am really excited to see the progress of them. There were a few parts of the album I thought could use work. There are spots that do not feel full and some spots where the producer could have done some work. There was one spot in particular where the guitar solo is much louder than anything else and it took me by surprise at first. However, besides the few minor issues I had, the album is really well constructed and is a step in the right direction for this band. Every Knee Shall Bow will go far if they can keep progressing musically. Oh, and before I forget, I meant to mention how much I like the vocals on. They fit well with the music and I really like that the range is pretty wide. The highs are awesome and the lows feel natural and not too overdone."

== Track listing ==
No.	Title	Length
1.	"Intro"	0:27
2.	"Slayers of Eden"	5:02
3.	"The Story Of..."	4:43
4.	"No Longer Slaves"	4:20
5.	"The Lion's Teeth"	3:41
6.	"Call of Love"	6:21
7.	"The Cleansing"	4:43
8.	"His Mercies"	5:32
9.	"Avenging the Martyrs"	3:13
10.	"Vigilance of Battle"	4:05
Total length:		42:07

== Personnel ==
Adapted from AllMusic.

Every Knee Shall Bow

- Chris Hull – lead and clean vocals
- Drew Wibblesman – Lead guitar, clean vocals
- Cole Wibblesman – Rhythm guitar
- Shane Wibblesman – Bass guitar
- DJ Wibblesman – Drums

Production

- Zach Alvey – assistant engineer, engineer
- Josh Barber – engineer, mastering, mixing, producer
- Shawn Browning – executive producer
- Raul Ramos – cover art
- Paul Stier – art direction, layout
