= 13 Slays Till X-Mas =

- Film poster
- Directed by: Brittany Blanton; Sean Blevins; Jed Brian; Shawn Burkett; William Capps; Alexander Clark; Carlos Omar De Leon; John Hale III; Blair Hoyle; Eric Huskisson; Robert Kern III; Drew Marvick; John Mason; P. J. Starks; Julie Streble
- Cinematography: Alexander Clark; Derek Huey; Emily James; Peter Leininger
- Edited by: Jed Brian; Emily James; John Mason; Brent Perrott; P. J. Starks
- Music by: Rocky Gray
- Release date: November 13, 2020
- Country: United States
- Language: English

13 Slays Till X-Mas is a 2020 Christmas themed horror anthology.

== Plot summary ==
A group of five men are invited to a dive bar on Christmas Eve. While waiting for their host to arrive the group decides to take turns telling stories: thirteen in all.

== Production ==
Directors Brittany Blanton, Sean Blevins, Jed Brian, Shawn Burkett, William Capps, Alexander Clark, Carlos Omar De Leon, John Hale III, Blair Hoyle, Eric Huskisson, Robert Kern III, Drew Marvick, John Mason, P. J. Starks, and Julie Streble were brought on to create segments for the film. Marvick commented on his addition to the film, "Santa Claws", noting that he had to make some changes to his script due to the COVID-19 pandemic. He had to abandon a scene that was placed in a crowded shopping mall and reduced his crew to two people.

== Release ==
13 Slays Till X-Mas premiered on November 13, 2020, at Kentucky Wesleyan College. This was followed by a release on home video the following year.

== Reception ==
Pop Horror praised the film for its soundtrack and for how the segments crossed over into one another. Dread Central was also favorable, writing that "While some of the segments were no doubt more memorable than others, 13 Slays Till Xmas was still a great addition to the ever growing list of more sinister films based around the Yuletide season."
