= Moses J. Moseley =

American actor (1990-2022)

- Born: December 23, 1990; Aiken, South Carolina, U.S.
- Died: January 26, 2022 (aged 31); Stockbridge, Georgia, U.S.
- Occupations: Actor; writer; model
- Years active: 2012–2022

Moses J. Moseley (December 23, 1990 – January 26, 2022) was an American actor, writer and model. He was known for his work on the series The Walking Dead. He had guest starring roles on the TV shows Queen of the South and Watchmen, and appeared in the film Volumes of Blood: Horror Stories. Moses also starred in Attack of the Southern Fried Zombies and Reyna Young's Doll Murder Spree.

== Early life and education ==
Moseley was born in Aiken, South Carolina, on December 24, 1990.

== Career ==
While a student at Georgia State University, Moseley was scouted to appear in the movie Joyful Noise with Queen Latifah and Dolly Parton. Moseley received his breakthrough role as one of Michonne's jaw-less pet walkers on AMC's horror drama television series The Walking Dead.

== Death ==
On January 16, 2022, Moseley's body was discovered near the Hudson bridge in a parking lot behind O'Reilly Auto Parts in Stockbridge, Georgia, bearing evidence of a gunshot wound. He was 31 at the time of his death.

== Filmography ==
Year	Title	Role	Notes
2012	Joyful Noise	Club Goer	Uncredited
2012	Trouble with the Curve	Baseball Fan Antwan McCheese	Uncredited
2012-2015	The Walking Dead	Walker / Mike / Pet Walker	6 episodes
2013	The Internship	Googler	Uncredited
2013	The Hunger Games: Catching Fire	District 11 citizen	Uncredited
2014	Dysfunctional 2014	Jimmy	
2014	The Lockhavens Show	Tito Moses	
2016	Loose Screws	Dre	
2016	Homicide Hunter: Lt. Joe Kenda	Keith Andrews	1 episode
2016	Volumes of Blood: Horror Stories	Steven	
2017	Attack of the Southern Fried Zombies	Robbie	
2017	The Grindhouse Radio	Himself	1 episode
2017	Doll Murder Spree	Jeremy Winters	
2018	Evidence of Innocence	Young Richard Miles	1 episode
2019	American Soul	Black man Running	1 episode
2019	Queen of the South	Tic Toc	1 episode
2019	Watchmen	Usher	1 episode
2020	Hank	Gabriel	
