= LVL IV =

Studio album by Future Leaders of the World
- Released: October 5, 2004
- Genre: Post-grunge
- Label: Epic
- Producer: Mike Flynn

LVL IV, pronounced Level Four, is the debut album by American post-grunge band Future Leaders of the World.

== Background and release ==
In 2003, singer and guitarist Phil Taylor, drummer Carl Messina, and bassist Toby Cole drove to Los Angeles to record a demo, which led to Cole's departure due to creative differences. Bassist Bill Hershey and lead guitarist Jake Stutevoss joined the lineup, and the band signed a deal with Epic Records. LVL IV was released in the fall of 2004, as was a music video for the song "Let Me Out".

== Touring ==
The band toured in 2005 with the likes of Chevelle and Crossfade, and took part in the Jägermeister Music Tour with Submersed and headliners Alter Bridge that spring. While on tour, the band was informed by Epic Records that their contract was terminated.

== Critical reception ==
Johnny Loftus of AllMusic gave the album 2.5 out of 5 stars, and said it is sonically influenced by Nirvana and Rage Against the Machine.

== Track listing ==
1. "Spotlight" – 4:11
2. "Everyday" – 3:22
3. "Let Me Out" – 4:04
4. "Kill Pop" – 3:47
5. "Unite" – 5:12
6. "Make You Believe" – 3:26
7. "Sued" – 4:05
8. "House of Chains" – 4:42
9. "4 Sale" – 5:02
10. "Your Gov't Loves You" – 4:13

== Personnel ==
- Phil Taylor – vocals, rhythm guitar
- Bill Hershey – bass guitar
- Jake Stutevoss – lead guitar
- Carl Messina – drums
- Mike Flynn – production

== Chart positions ==
LVL IV spent one week on the Billboard 200 at #153 and reached #4 on Top Heatseekers with a total of 20 charting weeks.

=== Album ===
Chart	Peak position	Year
Billboard 200	153	2004
Top Heatseekers	4	2004
