= Dead Alive (album) =

Studio album by Soul Embraced
- Released: April 29, 2008
- Genre: Alternative metal, Christian metal, death metal
- Length: 45:20
- Label: Solid State
- Producer: Barry Poynter

Soul Embraced chronology
Immune (2003)	Dead Alive (2008)	Mythos (2013)

Dead Alive is the fourth album by the Christian metal band, Soul Embraced. It is the first and last album to feature rhythm guitarist Devin Castle, and the last to feature drummer Lance Garvin.

== Critical reception ==
Professional ratings
Review scores
Source	Rating
Cross Rhythms	8/10 squares
Indie Vision Music	8/10; 7/10
Jesus Freak Hideout	4/5 stars

Giving the album an eight out of ten from Cross Rhythms, Peter John Willoughby states, "The lyrics are bound to unsettle, but you have to bear in mind that this is for the death metal scene and will not be suitable for an impressionable young teenager." Jason B, rating the album for Indie Vision Music an eight out of ten, says, "this is metal done right." Awarding the album seven out of ten, in a second review at Indie Vision Music, Josh Murphy describes, "Soul Embraced is capable of so much more than this." Zachary Zinn of Jesus Freak Hideout expresses "Soul Embraced knew what they were doing when they wrote Dead Alive. Luckily they didn't fall into the trap that many metal bands do- every song sounding the same with no originality in the mix. This will be a great addition to any metal-head's collection."

== Track listing ==
No.	Title	Length
1.	"To End It All"	4:50
2.	"Breaking Point"	3:28
3.	"Curtain of Deceit"	4:03
4.	"The Devil's Reflection"	2:41
5.	"Everything Reminds Me of You"	3:30
6.	"La Fin Absolue du Monde"	3:32
7.	"Crawl"	3:52
8.	"Into Darkness"	3:28
9.	"Judas I've Become"	3:28
10.	"Bloodstained Nevada"	2:27
11.	"Kill This"	3:19
12.	"In Memory"	3:00
13.	"Dead Alive"	3:41
Total length:		45:20

== Credits ==
Soul Embraced

- Chad Moore - Vocals
- Rocky Gray - Guitar, Engineer, Mixing
- Jeff Bowie - Bass
- Devin Castle - Guitar
- Lance Garvin - Drums

Production

- Alan Douches - Mastering
- Barry Poynter - Audio Production, Engineer, Additional Guitars, Producer
- Erik Rutan - Mixing

Art

- Ryan Clark - A&R, Package Design
- Adam Peterson - Photography
