= Volumes of Blood =

- Promotional release poster
- Directed by: P. J. Starks (segment "Ghastly"); Jakob Bilinski (segment "13 After Midnight"); Nathan Thomas Milliner (segment "The Encyclopedia Satanica"); John Kenneth Muir (segment "A Little Pick Me Up"); Lee Vervoort (segment "That’s A Wrap!")
- Written by: Todd Martin; Nathan Thomas Milliner; P. J. Starks
- Produced by: Jim Blanton; P. J. Starks; Nathan Seaton; Timothy Paul Taylor
- Starring: Kristine Renee Farley; Jason Crowe; Jim O'Rear; Roni Jonah
- Cinematography: D.P. Bonnell
- Edited by: Jakob Bilinski (segment "13 After Midnight"); D.P. Bonnell; Daniel Hiatt; P. J. Starks
- Music by: Tony McKee
- Distributed by: LeglessCorpse Films
- Release date: March 13, 2015
- Running time: 96 minutes
- Country: United States
- Language: English

Volumes of Blood is a 2015 American horror anthology film directed by P. J. Starks (segment "Ghastly"), Jakob Bilinski (segment "13 After Midnight"), Nathan Thomas Milliner (segment "The Encyclopedia Satanica"), John Kenneth Muir (segment "A Little Pick Me Up"), and Lee Vervoort (segment "That’s A Wrap!"). It stars Kristine Renee Farley, Jason Crowe, Jim O'Rear, and Roni Jonah.

== Premise ==
A sociology student and three friends meet in a library and craft four new urban legends.

== Production ==
Director P. J. Starks and Jim Blanton of the Daviess County Public Library in Owensboro, Kentucky developed the "Unscripted Film School" program to give Owensboro residents the opportunity to experience filmmaking firsthand. Their first project was an eight-minute horror short, followed by Volumes of Blood as their second. Using Kickstarter, the crew raised over $4,000 for the film.

== Reception ==
JoBlo.com awarded the film 7/10. Bloody Disgusting called the film "the Best Damn Anthology This Year."Dread Central awarded the film 3.5 stars and praised it to have "all the right bits in place to entertain the horror masses"

== Sequels ==
In a 2015 interview, P. J. Starks said he had ideas for a second and third volume. A sequel, entitled Volumes of Blood: Horror Stories, premiered on October 29, 2016 at the Owensboro Convention Center in Owensboro, Ky. Fangoria has called it "hands down, the most entertaining anthology in years." In an interview with Dread Central, producer P. J. Stark announced a second and final sequel called Devil's Knight: Volumes of Blood 3.
