= Volumes of Blood: Horror Stories =

2016 horror film

- Promotional release poster
- Directed by: Sean Blevins (segment "Trick or Treat"); John William Holt (segment "Feeding Time"); Jon Maynard (segment "Blood Bath"); Nathan Thomas Milliner (segments "Murder Death Killer", "Fear, For Sinners Here"); Justin Seaman (segment "The Deathday Party"); James Treakle (segment "A Killer House")
- Screenplay by: Sean Blevins; Nathan Thomas Milliner; P. J. Starks; Jason Turner
- Produced by: Eric Huskisson; David Justice; P. J. Starks; Devin Taylor
- Starring: Barbie Clark; Thomas Dunba; Aric Stanish; Nathan Thomas Milliner; Gerrimy Keiffer; Moses J. Moseley
- Cinematography: Alexander Clark; John William Holt; Austin Madding
- Edited by: Sean Blevins; John William Holt; Jon Maynard; Nathan Thomas Milliner; James Treakle
- Music by: Josh Coffey; Rocky Gray; Mikel Shane Prather
- Distributed by: Petri Entertainment
- Release date: October 29, 2016
- Running time: 118 minutes
- Country: United States
- Language: English

Volumes of Blood: Horror Stories is a 2016 American horror anthology film consisting of segments directed by Sean Blevins, John William Holt, Jon Maynard, Nathan Thomas Milliner, Justin Seaman and James Treakle. The film's screenplay was written by Sean Blevins, Nathan Thomas Milliner, P. J. Starks, and Jason Turner.

A sequel to the 2015 film Volumes of Blood, Volumes of Blood: Horror Stories was produced by Eric Huskisson, David Justice, P. J. Starks, and Devin Taylor. Like its predecessor, the film was shot in Owensboro, Kentucky.

== Reception ==
Jerry Smith of Fangoria called the film "hands down, the most entertaining anthology in years." It was also listed in Fangoria's "Year in Horror: Top 10 Horror Films" Matt Boiselle of Dread Central awarded the film three out of five stars. Halloween Daily News proclaimed the film to be a "Killer Anthology" and "highly recommended as one of the most ambitious anthologies and independent horror releases in recent years..." Crytptic Rock lauded the crew by saying, "those involved in the making of these films are skilled with the rather rare gift of taking coal-like resources and turning them into cinematic diamonds" and also awarded the film 4 out of 5 stars.

== Awards ==
The film won "Best Horror Anthology" at the 2016 Fright Night Film Fest.

== Sequel ==
In a 2015 interview, P. J. Starks said he had ideas for a third volume. In an interview with Dread Central, producer P. J. Stark announced a second and final sequel called Devil's Knight: Volumes of Blood 3.
