= Bianca Allaine =

American actress, host, and model

- Born: Bianca Allaine Evans; 1979 (age 45–46); Garland, Texas, U.S.
- Occupations: Actress; model; host
- Years active: 2005–present
- Spouse: Michael Kyne (m. 2011)
- Website: biancaallaine.com

Bianca Allaine Kyne (born Bianca Allaine Evans), also known as Bianca Barnett, Bianca Abel, or Bianca Allaine, is an American actress, host, and model. In 2011, Allaine won the Golden Cobb Award for "Best Rising B Actress".

== Early life and career beginnings ==
Allaine was born in Garland, Texas. At a young age Allaine discovered the book Scary Stories to Tell in the Dark, which began her "love for macabre." She was so frightened by the book that her mother tried to have it removed from the school library. Allaine started modeling and runway work for local agencies as well as hair and makeup shows in her hometown of Dallas, Texas; she then moved to Los Angeles, California at age eighteen to pursue acting, signing with Dragon Talent, who booked her background work in music videos. This led to further background work in student films, short films, television shows, and more music videos. Through her friend Lenora Claire, she was introduced to Ramzi Abed, who gave her parts in a few of his movies. She continued working on small projects, which included the film Canes. The project required her to wear prosthetic make-up, giving her the experience to take on the role of Pig Bitch in 2009's Albino Farm.

Allaine is set to appear in the upcoming film Cryptids.

== Personal life ==
Allaine has been married to fellow filmmaker Michael Kyne since August 5, 2011. Their short film M Is for Marriage was released on Bloody Disgusting's Anthology World of Death Blu-ray. As of 2015, the couple was working on a 1980s-inspired horror-comedy entitled Zombinatrix.

Among her other projects is the series Watch These Films with Bianca Allaine, which combines highlights, clips, re-enactments, and droll observations of cult classic horror films.
