= 10/31 (film) =

2017 American horror anthology film

- Promotional release poster
- Directed by: Hunter Johnson ("Malvolia: the Queen of Screams"); Justin M. Seaman ("The Old Hag"); Zane Hershberger ("Trespassers"); John William Holt ("Killing the Dance"); Brett DeJager ("The Halloween Blizzard of '91"); Rocky Gray ("The Samhain Slasher")
- Music by: Rocky Gray
- Release date: October 28, 2017 (Death By Festival)
- Country: United States
- Language: English

10/31 is a 2017 American anthology horror film consisting of five Halloween-themed short stories directed by Justin M. Seaman, Zane Hershberger, John William Holt, Brett DeJager, and Rocky Gray, along with a wraparound story directed by Hunter Johnson. The film is executive produced by P. J. Starks.

10/31 premiered at the Death By Festival in Austin, Texas, on October 28, 2017.

It was followed by three sequels, 10/31 Part 2 in 2019, 10/31 Part 3 in 2022 and 10/31 Part 4 in 2024.

== Reception ==
Matt Boiselle of Dread Central called the film "fun, spooky and damn entertaining", writing that "I can't recommend 10/31 enough for those who love their horror in short bursts, and all under one roof – make sure this is on your viewing list, for if these directors are the future of the genre, then we're in good bloody hands."

== Home media ==
10/31 was released on DVD, Blu-ray, and VHS in 2018 by Scream Team Releasing.
