= Justin M. Seaman =

American film director

- Born: Justin M. Seaman; Claysville, Pennsylvania

Justin M. Seaman is an American film director, producer, screenwriter, and editor. He is known for writing and directing the 2016 horror film The Barn and its sequel, The Barn Part II, and for directing segments of the anthology films Volumes of Blood: Horror Stories (2016) and 10/31 (2017). He is serving as a producer and director on the film Cryptids.

== Career ==
Seaman wrote and directed the 2016 horror film The Barn. He directed the segment "The Deathday Party" from the 2016 anthology horror film Volumes of Blood: Horror Stories, as well as the segment "The Old Hag" from the 2017 anthology film 10/31. In 2022, Seaman wrote and directed The Barn Part II, a sequel to The Barn, and served as a producer and director on the film Cryptids.
