= The Barn (film) =

2016 American horror film

- Theatrical release poster
- Directed by: Justin M. Seaman
- Written by: Justin M. Seaman
- Starring: Mitchell Musolino; Will Stout; Lexi Dripps
- Cinematography: Zane Hershberger
- Edited by: Justin M. Seaman
- Music by: Rocky Gray
- Production company: Nevermore Production Films
- Distributed by: Scream Team Releasing
- Release date: March 12, 2016 (Fright Night Theatre Film Festival)
- Running time: 90 minutes
- Country: United States
- Language: English

The Barn is a 2016 American horror film written and directed by Justin M. Seaman, and starring Mitchell Musolino, Will Stout, Lexi Dripps, Cortland Woodard, Nikki Howell, Nickolaus Joshua, Linnea Quigley, and Ari Lehman. The film is set on Halloween night 1989 and follows two teenage friends that end up accidentally resurrecting a deadly curse.

This film was followed by the sequels The Barn Part II (2022) and The Barn Part III (2026).

== Plot ==
All Sam and Josh want to do is have fun on Halloween and raise some mischief before they graduate from high school next year. They decide to go to a concert, only for a detour to result in them discovering a deserted barn. However unbeknownst to them, the barn that they've come across has a deadly curse attached to it and soon the teens find themselves at the mercy of three monsters: The Boogeyman, Hollow Jack, and the Candy Corn Scarecrow.

== Cast ==
- Mitchell Musolino as Sam
- Will Stout as Josh
- Lexi Dripps as Michelle
- Cortland Woodard as Chris
- Nikki Howell as Nikki
- Nickolaus Joshua as Russell
- Linnea Quigley as Ms. Barnhart
- Ari Lehman as Dr. Rock
- Ryan Nogy as Shirley Garrett
- David Hampton as George
- James Weldon as Mr. Daniels
- Justin M. Seaman as Boogeyman
- Rik Billock as Preacher

== Development ==
Seaman began planning for The Barn over a period of years and based the movie's script on a small book he wrote when he was eight years old. To achieve an atmosphere reminiscent of horror films from the 1980s, the crew attempted to replicate camera and lighting techniques from that decade. They also tried to minimize the number of scenes shot with a handheld camera. The soundtrack for The Barn was composed by Rocky Gray and the crew signed a deal with Lunaris Records to release the soundtrack to vinyl and cassette.

In August 2015, a campaign was created on the crowdfunding website Kickstarter, in order to help fund post-production and merchandising costs. The funding helped enable Seaman to re-add scenes that had previously been cut from the film due to budget issues.

== Release ==
The Barn premiered on March 12, 2016, at the Fright Night Theatre Film Festival in Hamilton, Ontario, Canada. It was then screened at various other festivals, including the Crimson Screen Horror Film Fest in North Charleston, South Carolina on May 15, 2016, and at the Idaho Horror Film Festival in Boise, Idaho on October 15, 2016.

== Reception ==
Daniel Kurland of Bloody Disgusting gave the film a mostly positive review, calling it "a love letter to monster movies and the campy decade where they reigned supreme, that's as fun as it is bloody". Matt Boiselle of Dread Central gave the film a rating of 4 out of 5 stars, recommending the film "to everyone looking for a fun, retro trip back to the days of grainy, low-budgeted horror yanked directly off the racks of your local video rental shop – this one will sit firmly entrenched in my top 5 of the best horror films for 2016". Kieran Fisher of Scream magazine wrote that the film "has everything a great hack n' slash should have – a back story, wonderful villains, great kills, effective scares and a ghoulish sense of humour".

Albert Nowicki included the film on his list of "best Halloween movies of all time" for Prime Movies.

=== Accolades ===
Year	Award	Category	Recipients	Result	Ref(s).
2016	Maverick Movie Awards	Best Original Score: Feature	Rocky Gray	Won	
2016	Maverick Movie Awards	Best Picture: Feature	The Barn	Nominated	
2016	Maverick Movie Awards	Best Actor: Feature	Will Stout	Nominated	
2016	Maverick Movie Awards	Best Supporting Actor: Feature	Nickolaus Joshua	Nominated	
2016	Maverick Movie Awards	Best Screenplay: Feature	Justin M. Seaman	Nominated	
2016	Maverick Movie Awards	Best Editing: Feature	Justin M. Seaman	Nominated	
2016	Maverick Movie Awards	Best Special FX: Feature	Robert Kuhn, Sara Kuhn, and Dakota Corwin	Nominated	
2016	Idaho Horror Film Festival	Audience Choice Award for Best Film	The Barn	Won	
2016	Crimson Screen Horror Film Fest	Crimmy Award for Best Feature Film	The Barn	Won	
2016	Crimson Screen Horror Film Fest	Crimmy Award for Best Director: Feature	Justin M. Seaman	Nominated	
2016	Crimson Screen Horror Film Fest	Crimmy Award for Best Actor: Feature	Mitchell Musolino	Nominated	
2016	Crimson Screen Horror Film Fest	Crimmy Award for Best Actress: Feature	Lexi Dripps	Nominated	
2016	Crimson Screen Horror Film Fest	Crimmy Award for Best Cinematography: Feature	Zane Hershberger	Won	
2016	Crimson Screen Horror Film Fest	Crimmy Award for Best Screenplay: Feature	Justin M. Seaman	Nominated	
2016	Crimson Screen Horror Film Fest	Crimmy Award for Best Special FX Make-Up: Feature	The Barn	Nominated	

== Video game ==
A video game adaptation of the film was released to mobile devices on May 3, 2016. The game has an 8-bit animation style and follows the film's protagonists as they try to survive Halloween night. Seaman created a commercial for the game, which was stylized to resemble a video game advertisement from the 1990s.

== See also ==
- List of films set around Halloween
