= Cynthia Lynch =

American professional wrestler

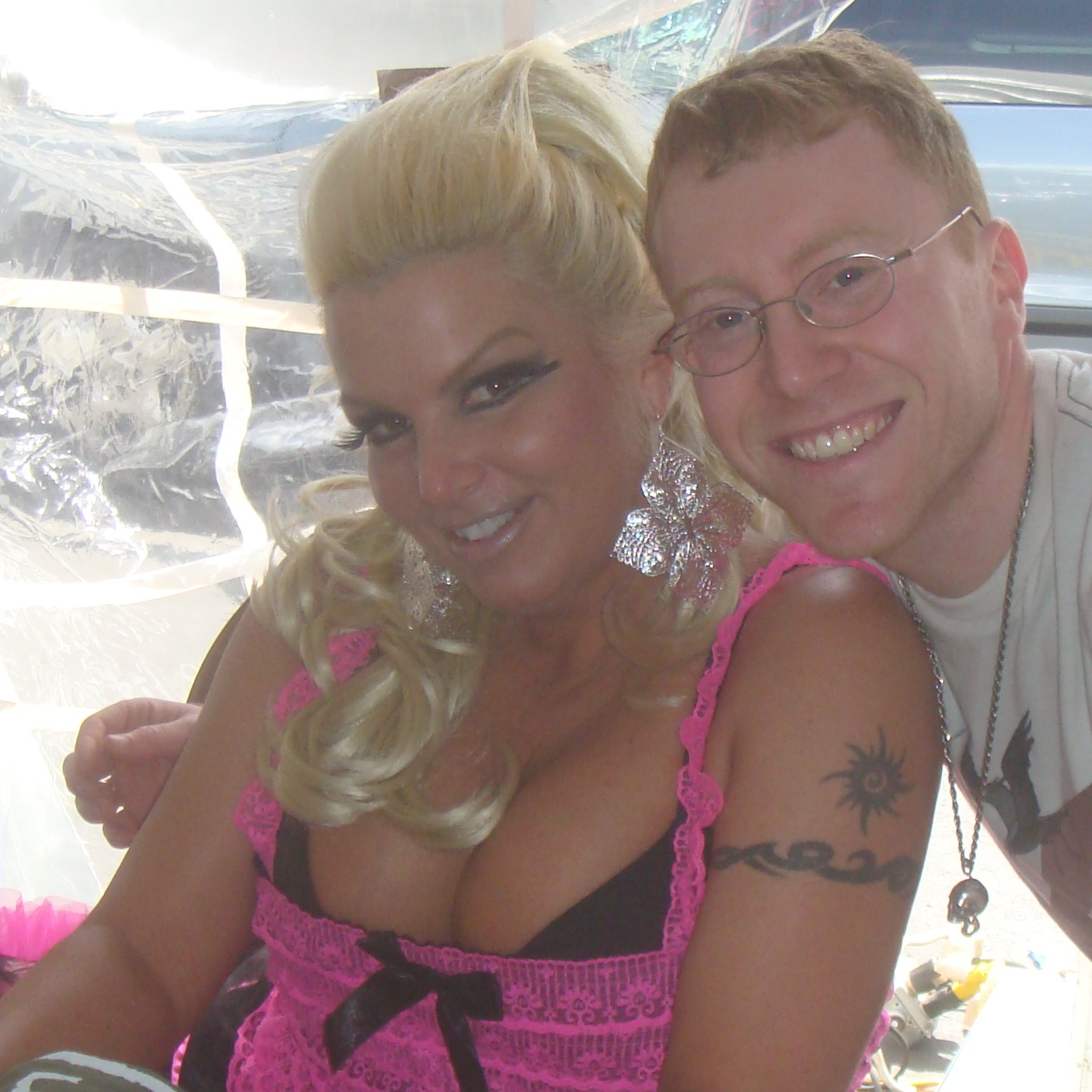
- Lynch with a fan in 2009

Personal information
- Born: May 18, 1971 (age 55) New York City, U.S.
- Spouse: Al Snow (m. 2009; div. 2016)

Professional wrestling career
- Ring name(s): Bobcat; Bobbie Bardot; Barroom Barbie; Cynthia Lynch; Cyndi Snow; Godfather's Ho; Principal Lazarus; Pussy Willow
- Billed height: 5 ft 8 in (1.73 m)
- Billed weight: 130 lb (59 kg; 9.3 st)
- Billed from: New Jersey
- Trained by: Axl Rotten; Dawn Marie Psaltis; Tom Prichard; William Regal
- Debut: December 1996
- Retired: 2012

Cynthia Lynch (born May 18, 1971) is a retired American professional wrestler and wrestling valet. She is best known for her time in the World Wrestling Federation (WWF) as Godfather's Ho, where she became the first of four women to win the WWF Hardcore Championship.

== Professional wrestling career ==
=== Early career (1996-1999) ===
Lynch made her debut in wrestling as a valet in December 1996, in the Northeastern independent circuit. She managed various wrestling including; Pat Kenney, Rik Ratchet, Steve Corino and The Inferno Kid. She began training to wrestle shortly after, mainly wrestling in mixed tag team matches. She made her debut singles match in February 1998, in a losing effort to Sweet Destiny. On July 24, 1999, she won the NWA New Jersey Junior Heavyweight Championship from Kevin Knight.

=== World Wrestling Federation (1999-2000) ===
In 1999, she caught the eye of WWF talent scout, Tom Prichard, who signed her to a developmental contract with the company in July, 1999. She was sent to WWF's then developmental territory Memphis Championship Wrestling (MCW). In October 1999, she made her main roster debut on an episode of WWF RAW is WAR as one of Godfather's Ho's and was attacked by Viscera. She continued to make sporadic appearances as Ho, in May 2000, she briefly won the WWF Hardcore Championship from Crash Holly, who pinned Lynch to regain the championship back fifteen seconds later. In December 2000, the WWF dropped MCW as one of their developmental territories, releasing some of the talents, including Lynch, in the process.

=== Independent circuit (2001-2009) ===
Lynch returned to the independent circuit after her release from the WWF, in the summer of 2002 she briefly worked for Total Nonstop Action Wrestling (TNA) as the valet of David Young.

She became a regular feature for the independent promotion Women's Extreme Wrestling (WEW) from 2002-2008, under multiple different gimmicks such as; Barroom Barbie, Bobcat, Principal Lazarus and Pussy Willow. On July 12, 2007, as Principal Lazarus, she won the Women's Extreme Wrestling Tag Team Championship alongside Roni Jonah, defeating Amy Zidian and Annie Social at Nude Street Fight. She briefly retired from professional wrestling in 2009.

=== Ohio Valley Wrestling (2012-2013) ===
In January 2012, Lynch joined her then husband, Al Snow's promotion, Ohio Valley Wrestling unsuccessfully challenging Taeler Hendrix for the OVW Women's Championship. The following week she teamed with CJ Lane in a losing effort to Aleida Ortiz and Hendrix. In March 2012, she became the valet of the tag team X2C (Raphael Constantine and Sean Casey). Her final match was in April 2013, in a losing effort to Trina, in a battle royal alongside; Cinnamon Twist, Hannah Blossom, Heidi Lovelace, Holly Blossom, Jessie Belle and Taeler Hendrix.

== Personal life ==
In July 2016, Lynch was named of part of a class action lawsuit filed against the WWE, which alleged that wrestlers incurred traumatic brain injuries during their tenure and that the company concealed the risks of injury. The suit is litigated by attorney Konstantine Kyros, who has been involved in a number of other lawsuits against WWE. US District Judge Vanessa Lynne Bryant dismissed the lawsuit in September 2018.

== Filmography ==
Television
Year	Title	Role	Notes
2001	WWF: Hardcore	Hardcore Ho	Direct to video, archive footage
2001	Hey Paisan!	Aunt Cecile	TV film
2007	Gene Simmons: Family Jewels	Self; guest	1 episode
2009	Hell House	Lady	Short film
2025	Race with the Devil	Angie Johnson	Short film

Video games
Year	Title	Role	Notes
2000	WWF No Mercy	Ho	Video game debut

== Championships and accomplishments ==
- New-Wave Championship Wrestling
  - NWCW Women's Championship.
- NWA New Jersey
  - NWA New Jersey Junior Heavyweight Championship (1 time)
- Women's Extreme Wrestling
  - WEW Tag Team Championship (1 time) - with Roni Jonah
- World Wrestling Federation
  - WWF Hardcore Championship (1 time)
