= Believer (band) =

American thrash metal band

- Also known as: Deceiver (1985–1986)
- Origin: Colebrook Township, Pennsylvania, U.S.
- Genres: Thrash metal, progressive metal, Christian metal
- Years active: 1986–1994, 2005–2017 (on hiatus)
- Labels: Metal Blade, R.E.X., Roadrunner
- Members: Kurt Bachman; Joey Daub; Jeff King; Kevin Leaman
- Past members: Dave Baddorf; Howe Kraft; Scott Laird; Wyatt Robertson; Jim Winters; Elton Nestler
- Website: Archived February 28, 2025, at the Wayback Machine

Believer is an American technical thrash metal band from Pennsylvania. Formed in 1986, the band plays a hybrid of thrash and progressive metal, and is also known for their innovative use of symphonic elements. Their lyrics deal with topics of philosophy, theology and social issues.

The two primary members of the band are vocalist/bassist/guitarist Kurt Bachman and drummer Joey Daub, who were joined by several others after their 1989 debut album, Extraction from Mortality. The band was jointly signed to Roadrunner Records and the Christian label R.E.X. Music. According to AllMusic, several mainstream magazines praised their second album Sanity Obscure. The title track of Sanity Obscure was covered by Robert Prince for the video game Doom as the track "On the Hunt". The band toured the US and Europe with Bolt Thrower the following year. Believer disbanded in 1994; however, in 2005, Daub announced that he and Bachman reformed the band. They signed with Metal Blade Records in 2008, and released a fourth album, Gabriel, in 2009. Their fifth studio album, Transhuman, was released in 2011.

== History ==
=== Formation and Extraction from Mortality (1986–1989) ===
Believer was formed in Colebrook, Pennsylvania in 1986 by drummer Joey Daub and vocalist-guitarist Kurt Bachman. The band was joined by Howe Kraft (bass) and David Baddorf (guitar). Originally, the band was called Deceiver, and the band played covers of Iron Maiden, Saxon, and Judas Priest. The band changed the name to Believer after hearing the song of the same name off of Diary of a Madman by Ozzy Osbourne. Eventually, they began playing original melodic metal and released the cassette The Return in 1987. Later, Believer changed its style to thrash metal, as the band said: "We realized that we could write thrash better than we could write anything else".

In high school, the band leader Kurt Bachman met Scott Laird, who was studying his first year as a music instructor. When Believer was recording the title track for its first studio album, the band asked Laird to compose an orchestral intro for the song. In 1989, Believer was signed to R.E.X. Records which published Believer's first album, Extraction from Mortality. The album was mostly distributed to Christian bookstores but quickly gained popularity for Believer who soon became recognized as one of Christian metal's leading groups. The song "Not Even One" appeared on Roadrunner Records' compilation At Death's Door in 1990 which was composed mostly of death metal bands. Writer Jeff Wagner noted that Believer's thrash-leaning sound was intense enough to hang amidst the heavier, more brutal and decidedly non-Christian metal bands on the compilation. With the appearance, Believer entered the general metal scene and was subsequently signed by Roadrunner.

=== Sanity Obscure, Dimensions and breakup (1990–1994) ===
In 1990, Howe Kraft was replaced by Wyatt Robertson, and Believer recorded its second album titled Sanity Obscure, which is more technical than its predecessor. Believer continued its co-working with Scott Laird, and incorporated more symphonic elements on the song "Dies Irae (Day of Wrath)". Scott Laird's sister Julianne Laird Hoge was featured as a soprano on the song. Sanity Obscure also features an anti-pollution song titled "Nonpoint" (which the band nonpoint named themselves after) and an anti-drug song called "Stop the Madness", which was released as a single with the U2 cover "Like a Song". Sanity Obscure was first released by R.E.X. Records to Christian market and a year later by Roadrunner Records to wider audience. The album became more popular than Believer's first album, and after the release Believer toured with the English deathgrind band Bolt Thrower and the Canadian thrash metal band Sacrifice. Joined by bands Cynic and Pestilence on the label's roster, Roadrunner Records pushed a progressive metal/thrash campaign with the three bands called "The Breed Beyond".

Wyatt Robertson and David Baddorf left Believer before the band began recording its third album. Jim Winters joined as bassist and also played some guitar parts during the recording sessions. In 1993, Believer released its most technical, progressive, and ambitious album titled Dimensions. Kurt Bachman had been a guitar player in an industrial metal group called Under Midnight, which possibly influenced some industrial sound effects on Dimensions. The lyrics deal with the philosophical paradoxes and the ponderings of Sigmund Freud, Thomas J. J. Altizer, Ludwig Feuerbach and Jean-Paul Sartre about the existence of God. The symphonic metal suite, "Trilogy of Knowledge", divided into three chapters and an intro, is a 20 minute+ epic written around the biblical story of the life of Christ and the knowledge of good and evil. "Trilogy of Knowledge" once again featured the orchestral compositions of Scott Laird and soprano vocals by Julianne Laird Hoge. During the Dimensions tour, Scott laird played violin and viola.

After Dimensions the band went on a hiatus. In 1994, Believer agreed to mutually disband. After disbanding, Bachman went to get his degree, Daub became a Semi-Professional BMX biker, who endorses in Deluxx Bikes, while Winters joined acts such as Starkweather and Earth Crisis.

=== Return and Gabriel (2005–2009) ===
During the following years both Bachman and Daub worked in sound production at their Trauma Studios in Pennsylvania for groups such as Turmoil and Living Sacrifice. Later, Bachman continued in his medical studies, while Daub kept working in the music industry. Later in the 1990s, Daub began playing drums in a female-fronted progressive metal band called Fountain of Tears.

In 2005, Joey Daub informed on his website joeydaub.com that he had begun writing new Believer material with Bachman. This announcement was reported widely, most notably through Blabbermouth.net, which called Believer a "much missed late 80s and early 90s technical thrash metal band." In an interview, Bachman explained that he moved closer to the studio near where Joey Daub lives. Daub was working on mixing Fountain of Tears' new album and invited Bachman to help: "We just got together and started playing and having fun," Bachman stated, "nothing serious, but the chemistry was still there and stuff started clicking. We wrote some tunes, played them for some people and then some of our friends in the industry said 'you guys should put this out, maybe there's one or two Believer fans still out there that wouldn't mind hearing it.'"

The band started working on an album and completed pre-production of new songs during November 2007. On October 21, 2007, Believer launched an official MySpace page. The band's catalogue was rereleased by the Polish label Metal Mind Productions. Blabbermouth.net reported the album's recording process which began on November 24, drum tracking was completed on December 30, bass was laid down on January 28, 2008, rhythm guitar tracks were completed on February 18, and on April 7 the band announced that the album would feature "some very talented guests." Ten days later on April 17, Deron Miller of CKY announced that he will be "laying down some guest solos and/or vocals" for the forthcoming Believer album. He commented that "Believer have been one of my favorite bands for 20 years so this is really exciting for me. Check out the three records they did in the '90s... All three are works of genius." On August 13, it was announced that the album would also feature guest performances by Joe Rico of the band Sacrifice, with whom Believer toured in the early 1990s, and Rocky Gray of Living Sacrifice.

On November 18, 2008, Blabbermouth.net announced Believer's signing with Cesspool Recordings, an imprint of Metal Blade Records owned by Howard Jones of Killswitch Engage. In an interview with Metalsucks.net, Bachman commented that the announcement about the band's re-activation had spread to the industry, and a staff member from Blabbermouth/Roadrunner Records suggested that they should contact Howard: "We got in touch with him and it turns out he is a big Believer fan. He knows more about the history of Believer than we do! It was really cool. So we flew him in to the studio, we worked with him over two days. Then he mentioned that he was starting this imprint with Brian Slagel from Metal Blade and he asked us if we wanted to be the first band on it." Jones forwarded the band to Slagel whom reportedly replied: "Believer? Absolutely, lets do this.'" "It was sort of an easy process for us as far as the business end of it was concerned," Bachman stated. They signed a 3-album deal with Metal Blade.

The fourth full-length studio album titled Gabriel was released on March 17, 2009, in US and Canada, and on April 9–15 elsewhere. The album line-up consists Kurt Bachman (vocals, guitar), Joey Daub (drums), Jeff King (keyboards, of Fountain of Tears fame), Kevin Leaman (guitar), and Elton Nestler (bass). Scott Laird (violin), Jim Winters (guitar) and William Keller, who played with the band previously, also contributed to the album as session musicians. An unmastered version of the song "Medwton" from the album premiered on Bam Margera's Radio Bam show on November 17. The track "Focused Lethality" was released as a single on February 13. The song is reminiscent of the band's style on their first album. The second single "Stoned" was released on March 12. The album was mostly positively received. The band played live shows after the release.

=== Transhuman (2010–present) ===
On August 15, 2010, it was announced that Believer started recording follow-up for Gabriel. Bachman stated that "once again, the tunes are quite different." Recording was completed on December 8, 2010. It was commented that "We decided to bring back some of the orchestral feel of 'Dimensions' by utilizing more layered guitars, keys and melody with different vocal arrangements. There is still the 'Believer' sound, but the musical progression continues for us." The album, Transhuman, was released in April 2011. It was recognized as more genre-defying and experimental than the band's previous efforts.

In more recent days, Guitarist Kevin Leaman did an interview on the As The Story Grows Podcast. When the interviewer asked if the upcoming new release will be put out on Metal Blade Records, Leaman said their deal with them was done and they are thinking of releasing it independently. In 2017, the band began to release two song releases, starting with "Home" and "888" as 1 of 5. The band released 2 of 5 and 3 of 5 later that year. However, the band stopped releasing new material that year and have been inactive since.

== Music and legacy ==
Believer's music includes raw distortion, time changes, technical riffs and Bachman's raspy vocals. Some ambience is created with industrial elements and occasional classical music strings. The song structures are complicated and progressive. The debut is based more on straightforward thrash while Sanity Obscure took a more technical and progressive approach. Dimensions is experimental and avant-garde by its nature. The fourth album Gabriel has been described "a natural progression from Dimensions." The album features more processed voices and sound effects yet less symphonic elements than Dimensions. Bachman's vocals are notably higher than they had been previously.

The band is noted for "employing female vocals, violins, cellos, and choirs, before it was ever conceived as commonplace [in metal]." Jeff Wagner noted that the song Dies Irae "can be considered a creative watershed in metal—other than Mekong Delta who regularly delivered classical-entrenched compositions, no extreme metal band had merged the genre so seamlessly and convincingly," "and foreshadowed the operatic approach of future metal bands such as Therion and Nightwish. Believer's music has influenced several acts in the metal scene, for example the Norwegian group Extol, and American groups Living Sacrifice and Killswitch Engage cites Believer as an influence.

== Christianity ==
When asked whether the members consider Believer a "Christian band" Daub replies in an interview with Metal Covenant in 2009: "Well, yes, and no... this is a difficult subject to approach for us. Ever since we formed Believer, Kurt Bachman and myself despised being limited to a certain belief or style of music. We did not like to be labeled or numbered. Whether it was our personal spiritual journey, or the type of music we played. We were called thrash, death metal, technical death metal etc. The key focus for us then and now is to just encourage people to think for themselves." Daub comments about the lyrics that "We always wrote about what was near and dear to our heart. On Extraction, we used Bible based themes and stories to express our intentions, but we did not want to preach." "Well we never wanted to be known as a Christian band for one [laughs]. It was one of these things where it got out of control. With promoting records it was one of those things where the record company was like "Hey, here's a slant. Something different. Something new and unique. Let's go for that". I've always tried to stay away from labeling the band. For me it's a band, it's entertainment. We even get called death metal some times even though I don't think we resemble anything death metal-ish out there, but then again I have my own opinions on what death metal is. We just don't want it to be one of those things where someone's like "oh I hate thrash music, so I won't like Believer". You get labeled and we're going to have to go through labels but we're not really comfortable with any." says Bachman in an interview on MetalSucks.

== Members ==
Current

- Kurt Bachman – vocals, guitars (1986–present), bass (1992–present)
- Joey Daub – drums (1986–present)
- Jeff King – keyboards, programming, guitars, bass (2005–present)
- Kevin Leaman – guitars (2007–present)

Former

- Dave Baddorf – guitars (1986–1992)
- Howe Kraft – bass (1986–1989)
- Scott Laird – violin, viola (1988–1994)
- Wyatt Robertson – bass (1989–1992)
- Jim Winters – bass, guitars (1992–1994)
- Elton Nestler – bass, keyboards (2005–2010)

Timeline

== Discography ==
- The Return (demo, 1987)
- Extraction from Mortality (1989) R.E.X. Records
- Sanity Obscure (1990) Roadrunner Records
- Dimensions (1993) Roadrunner Records
- The Chosen Live (live, 2007) ERMI Records (bootleg)
- Gabriel (2009) Metal Blade Records
- Transhuman (2011) Metal Blade Records
- 1 of 5 (2017)
- 2 of 5 (2017)
- 3 of 5 (2017)

== Sources ==
- Hale, Mark (1993). "0303". Headbangers (First edition, second printing ed.). Ann Arbor, Michigan: Popular Culture, Ink. p. 35. ISBN 1-56075-029-4.
- Jeff Wagner; Steven Wilson (2010). Mean Deviation: Four Decades of Progressive Heavy Metal. Bazillion Points Books. ISBN 978-0-9796163-3-4.
