= Sanity Obscure =

Studio album by Believer
- Released: 1990
- Recorded: 1990
- Studios: Morning Star Studios, Spring House, Pennsylvania
- Genres: Christian metal, thrash metal
- Length: 37:49
- Labels: R.E.X., Roadrunner, Retroactive, Metal Mind
- Producers: Doug Mann, Paul Krueger

Believer chronology
Extraction from Mortality (1989)	Sanity Obscure (1990)	Dimensions (1993)

Sanity Obscure is the second studio album by the American Christian thrash metal band Believer. It was initially released in 1990 on R.E.X. and later in 1991 on Roadrunner, marking the band's label debut for Roadrunner. Several mainstream magazines praised the album. The sixth track on the album, "Dies Irae (Day of Wrath)", is one of the earliest examples of symphonic metal.

== Style, writing, composition ==
The band thought that the album "highlighted our German thrash influences such as Kreator and Destruction". Also, they "started experimenting with different rhythm structures" and "decided to expand our use of strings" with the song "Dies Irae (Day of Wrath)" as a result.

Sanity Obscure begins with an intro called "Teddy Bears", in which a musical box tune distorts into obscurity. The album contains "dissonant guitar riffs, unusual stop-start rhythms and complicated arrangements", with Kurt Bachman's vocals being "the only conventional sounding characteristic of Sanity Obscure."

The lyrics deal with theology and social issues. "Wisdom's Call" is about personal wisdom and its calling that simple people reject. "Stop the Madness" talks about a drug user who has been brainwashed by a decaying world, and is always searching to belong but is unable to tell where their shattered dreams are. "Nonpoint" takes a stance on the dark side of the industrialized society where general ignorance has caused pollution that corrupts nature, and in the end, man's soul. "Like a Song" is a cover of a U2's rebel song which ponders that one must start revolution from within oneself before one can change the world.

According to Jeff Wagner in his book Mean Deviation, the song "Dies Irae (Day of Wrath)" was a creative watershed in metal, and except for Mekong Delta, no other extreme metal band at the time had merged the genre with classical music so seamlessly. The orchestral section was conducted by Scott Laird, "who was Kurt's orchestra teacher in High School and also recorded the strings for the intro to the title track on 'Extraction From Mortality'". The song's first three minutes consist of orchestrated strings, synthesizer effects and the soprano vocals of Julianne Laird Hoge, Scott Laird's sister and at the time working as a professional opera singer. After that the band joins in with its thrash metal output in contrast with the orchestration. Doug Mann executed the concept of the song and the band section was composed by Kurt Bachman. Dies irae itself is a Latin poem or hymn which prays mercy at the dawn of apocalypse. The poem was originally written by Thomas of Celano, an Italian friar of the Franciscans, who lived in 13th century and was an obligatory part of the Roman Catholic Requiem Mass for some centuries before 1969. Kurt Bachman stated that the song was inspired by Mozart's Requiem Mass. The song's text can be found as the Catholic chant "Libera me" and is sung in its entirety in Latin. Due to "the expense needed to travel and perform with an orchestra" the song was performed live only once.

== Recording, production ==
Sanity Obscure was recorded and mixed within approximately two weeks. The band used four layers for the rhythm guitar tracks.

== Release ==
The band released a promo single for the track "Stop the Madness", which also featured album track "Like a Song" and an anti-drug PSA.

The original pressings of both R.E.X. Records and Roadrunner Records are sold out and copies are hard to find.

In 2005, Canadian record label Retroactive Records issued a 1000-unit pressing of Sanity Obscure, in which they included an instrumental "bonus track" from Believer's 1987 demo The Return titled "I.Y.F.". This caused some controversy when both Kurt Bachman and Joey Daub said that they would have not given permission to include extra material if they were asked. In their opinion, the track listing should have stayed as it originally was. However, the record company did not break any copyright laws.

Polish label Metal Mind Productions reissued Sanity Obscure as a remastered digipak version with liner notes by the band on November 5, 2007, along with the albums Extraction from Mortality and Dimensions.

== Reception and legacy ==
Professional ratings
Review scores
Source	Rating
AllMusic	4/5 stars
Cross Rhythms	10/10
Fear	3/5 stars
Guitar World	3/5 stars

Sanity Obscure received a wider audience than Extraction from Mortality. Although Sanity Obscure never really became popular, several mainstream magazines praised the album. According to Jeff Wagner, the song Dies Irae "foreshadowed the operatic approach of future metal bands such as Therion and Nightwish." A retrospective review by Decibel called the song "one of the earliest recorded examples of symphonic metal, using orchestral parts and operatic female vocals that presaged both Nightwish and S&M."

According to the members of Doomworld, the video game musician Robert Prince covered the title song "Sanity Obscure" for the video game Doom in E1M6 level's song "On the Hunt" (see: Making of Doom). The song "Dies Irae (Day of Wrath)" also appeared on the soundtrack of the skating video series of CKY.

The alternative metal band Nonpoint got their name from the namesake song off Sanity Obscure.

In 2010, HM Magazine ranked Sanity Obscure #42 on its Top 100 Christian Rock Albums of all time list, stating: "When Christians make art that blows people away with its creativity, skill and excellence ... well, isn’t that the way it’s supposed to be when people are in relation to the Creator? Sanity Obscure – case in point." In the August 2010 issue of Heaven's Metal fanzine, the album ranked #10 on the Top 100 Christian metal albums of all time list.

== Touring ==
Following the release of Sanity Obscure, Believer toured first in Europe and then, in 1991, with British death metal band Bolt Thrower and Canadian thrash metal band Sacrifice in the United States.

== Track listing ==
All tracks are written by Kurt Bachman, Joey Daub, David Baddorf and Wyatt Robertson except where noted.

No.	Title	Length
1.	"Sanity Obscure"	6:06
2.	"Wisdom's Call"	3:44
3.	"Nonpoint"	5:14
4.	"Idols of Ignorance"	4:39
5.	"Stop the Madness"	3:56
6.	"Dies Irae (Day of Wrath)"	5:41
7.	"Dust to Dust"	5:02
8.	"Like a Song" (Written by U2)	3:27

== Personnel ==
=== Believer ===
- Kurt Bachman – vocals, guitar, band section composition (track 6)
- Joey Daub – drums
- Wyatt Robertson – bass
- David Baddorf – guitar

=== Additional musicians ===
- Julianne Laird Hoge – soprano (6)

=== Technical personnel ===
- Doug Mann – production
- Paul Krueger – production
- Paul Krueger – engineering
- Jeff Spencer – cover art
- Tom Storm – photos
- Ted Hermanson – intro engineering (1)
- Scott Laird – orchestral composition (6)

== Chart positions ==
Chart (1991)	Peak position
US Top Contemporary Christian (Billboard)	25
