= Soul Embraced =

American melodic death metal band

- Origin: Little Rock, Arkansas, U.S.
- Genres: Christian metal; melodic death metal; death metal
- Years active: 1997–present
- Labels: Solid State; Blood & Ink; Clenched Fist; Rottweiler
- Members: Rocky Gray; Chad Moore; Jeff Bowie; Lance Garvin; Cody Smith
- Past members: Jack Wiese; Devin Castle; David Sroczynski; Ed Collins; Charlie West; Jon Dunn
- Website: Soul Embraced on Facebook

Soul Embraced is an American Christian metal band from Little Rock, Arkansas. It was originally a side project for Rocky Gray and David Sroczynski.

== History ==
Formed in 1997 as a side project of drummer David Sroczynski and William "Rocky" Gray from Shredded Corpse, the band dissolved after recording one song for a metal compilation in 1998. Gray reformed the band with fellow Living Sacrifice member Lance Garvin (drums) and Chad Moore (vocals).

When Gray and Garvin weren't busy with Living Sacrifice, they worked with Charlie T. West on their death metal side project. The band released an EP (The Fleshless EP), and three albums (For the Incomplete, This Is My Blood, Immune) over five years. For the Incomplete was re-released in 2003 by independent label Blood and Ink Records.

In 2002, the band was part of a sampler for Tarantula Promotions, Arachnid Terror Sampler, which featured bands such as Sanctifica, Tortured Conscience, Frosthardr and Frost Like Ashes.

Evanescence's song "Tourniquet" is a cover of the Soul Embraced song "My Tourniquet". From 2003 to 2007, Gray was Evanescence's drummer as well as playing with numerous other bands. Gray said in an interview after the release of Immune that the band planned on releasing two to three more albums, and in 2006 announced new members Jack Wiese on guitar and bassist Jeff Bowie. In June 2007, Wiese left the band to spend more time on other projects, and was replaced with Devin Castle (who is also in Mourningside with Gray, Bowie, and Wiese)

Soul Embraced released Dead Alive in April 2008.

Soul Embraced stated on their Myspace that they would "continue with a new guitarist next year when we get ready to record the new record". After 10 years and three records, Soul Embraced left Solid State Records on amicable terms. Mythos was released on Rottweiler Records.

In 2014, it was announced that former drummer, Lance Garvin, would rejoin with the new lineup of Rocky Gray (lead guitar), Chad Moore (vocals), Jon Dunn (bass), and Cody Smith (rhythm guitar). In 2017, the band stated that they had a new album coming up. The band was working on a new tour and announced that former bassist Jeff Bowie had Soul Embraced while also remaining with their labelmates Becoming Saints.

== Band members ==
Current members
Name	Instrument	Years	Other groups
Chad Moore	lead vocals	1999–present	Kill System, The Burning, Thy Pain
Cody Smith	rhythm guitar (2009, 2014—present), lead guitar (2009—present)	2009—present	Abandon the Artifice
Jeff Bowie	bass	2006–2012, 2017–present	Descended from Wolves, Mourningside, Becoming Saints, Creepy Carnival
Rocky Gray	lead guitar (1997–1998, 1999–2009, 2014–present), rhythm guitar (1997–1998, 1999–2006, 2014–present), bass (1997–1998, 1999–2006), drums (2009–2014), backing vocals (1999–present)	1997–1998, 1999–present	Evanescence, Solus Deus, Kill System, Living Sacrifice, The Burning, Thy Pain
Lance Garvin	drums	1999–2009, 2014–present	Living Sacrifice, Zao, Throwdown, Kill System

Former members
Name	Instrument	Years	Other groups
Jack Wiese	rhythm guitar	2006–2007	Mourningside, the.5th.element, Machina, BrookRoyal, ThePour
Devin Castle	rhythm guitar, backing vocals	2007–2009	The Vail, Mourningside
David Sroczynski	drums	1997–1998	Shredded Corpse, Thy Pain
Charlie West	rhythm guitar, lead guitar	1997–2001	
Ed Collins	rhythm guitar	2010–2014	
Jon Dunn	bass	2012–2017	Jon Dunn Band, Woodswyck

Touring musicians
Name	Instrument	Years	Other groups
Arthur Green	bass	1999–2006	Living Sacrifice, Eso-Charis, Elliot
John LeCompt	rhythm guitar, lead guitar	2001–2006	Evanescence, Kill System, Mindrage, Machina

Session musicians
Name	Instrument	Years	Other groups
Jeremiah Scott	rhythm guitar	2013	The Showdown, Demon Hunter, Destroy Destroy Destroy

Timeline

== Discography ==
EPs

- The Fleshless (1999)

Studio albums

Year	Title	Label
2000	For the Incomplete	Clenched Fist Records
2002	This Is My Blood	Solid State
2003	Immune	Solid State
2008	Dead Alive	Solid State
2013	Mythos	Rottweiler Records

Other songs

- "Truth Solution" originally performed by Living Sacrifice on their album, Reborn.
