= Girl/Girl Scene =

American comedy-drama streaming television series

- Genre: Drama
- Created by: Tucky Williams
- Country of origin: United States
- Original language: English
- No. of seasons: 3
- No. of episodes: 23

Production
- Running time: 40 minutes

Original release
- Release: September 6, 2010 – January 5, 2015

Girl/Girl Scene is an American comedy-drama streaming television series. It was created and written by Tucky Williams, who also stars as Evan, a sexually promiscuous, androgynous, lesbian. The first episode premiered on Blip (now defunct), on September 6, 2010, and the last episode premiered on January 5, 2015. The story features several LGBT women struggling with romantic relationships. The series now airs on Amazon Video.

== Cast ==
- Tucky Williams as Evan
- Abisha Uhl as Bender
- Katie Stewart as Maxine
- Joe Elswick as Jessie
- Cyndy Allen as Susan
- Jackson E. Cofer as Elliott
- Kayden Kross as Avery
- Roni Jonah as Trista
- David Haney as Dan
- Santana Berry as Tyler
- Joe Gatton as Mike
- Caitlyn Kogge as Hayley
- Thomas J. Phillips as Todd
- Abisha Uhl as Bender
- Eric Butts as Tomas
- Lauren Albert as Ling

== Reception ==
Critical reviews of the series have been mostly positive or positive-leaning. Curve magazine wrote, "Girl/Girl Scene portrays the emotional reality of lesbians. It's not just a show about sex, drugs and drama - it has depth and realistic characters, which makes Girl/Girl Scene easy to connect with." Decider praised the series for being "a lot of fun" and avoiding "PSA territory." In a more neutral review, Autostraddle, an online magazine, said that one of the main criticisms of Girl/Girl Scene is its "lackluster acting", further commenting that "the writing could be a little sharper, too." Those details, however, "don’t detract from the excitement of watching your own [lesbian] community."

The series has been compared to the Showtime LGBT television series The L Word.

== Film ==
A film based on the series, entitled Girl/Girl Scene - The Movie, was released in 2019.
