= Future Leaders of the World =

American rock band

- Also known as: Machina
- Origin: Buffalo, New York, U.S.
- Genre: Post-grunge
- Members: Phil Tayler; John LeCompt; Thad Ables; Rocky Gray; Jack Wiese
- Past members: Toby Cole; Jake Stutevoss; Carl Messina; Bill Hershey Ian Butler-Severson Jeremy Young Russell Bullock Jared Mosely

Future Leaders of the World is a rock band formed by singer and guitarist Phil Taylor, drummer Carl Messina, and bassist Toby Cole, in Buffalo, New York. Their debut album, LVL IV, was released in 2004. With a new lineup, the band was renamed Machina in 2005. They released another album under the Future Leaders of the World name, Reveal, in 2015.

== History ==
While backstage at a Puddle of Mudd concert in Los Angeles, singer and guitarist Phil Tayler met Epic Records A&R Mike Flynn and sent him his demo when he went back to Buffalo. Flynn told him he financed the recording of a three-song demo. Tayler formed the band with drummer Carl Messina and bassist Toby Cole and they drove to Los Angeles to record. Cole then left due to creative differences. In late 2003, bassist Bill Hershey and lead guitarist Jake Stutevoss joined the lineup, and the band signed a deal with Epic. Their debut album, LVL IV, was released in 2004, and reached number 4 on the Billboard Top Heatseekers chart. While on tour, Epic terminated their contract with the band and the group disbanded. In 2005, Tayler regrouped with a new lineup, including guitarist Jack Wiese, guitarist John LeCompt, bassist Thad Ables, and drummer Rocky Gray, and the band was renamed Machina.

Machina toured in the US in 2007, and released a self-titled EP.

In 2008, Phil Taylor recruited Ian Butler-Severson, guitarist and founding member of the Minneapolis, MN alt-metal band Gingerjake, to finish recording tracks in Seattle that would eventually appear on the sophomore album, Reveal (2015).

In 2009, a reformed Future Leaders of the world lineup with Taylor on vocals, Severson on guitar, Derek Abrams (ex-Ministry) on drums, released a three-song EP, Delirium, followed by heavy US touring.

In 2012, Machina, now its own separate band with Taylor, LeCompt, George, and Ables, signed a deal with Rogue Records for the release of their album To Live And Die In The Garden Of Eden.

Future Leaders of the World would release their next album Reveal, in 2015, via Pavement Entertainment, with 2014 and 2015 tours in the US and Japan with members Ian Severson (guitar), Russell Bullock (drums) and Jared Mosely (bass).

== Members ==
Machina

- Phil Taylor – vocals, guitar
- John LeCompt – guitar
- Jack Wiese – guitar
- Thad Ables – bass
- Rocky Gray – drums

Former members

- Toby Cole – bass
- Jake Stutevoss – guitar
- Bill Hershey – bass
- Carl Messina – drums
- Ian Butler-Severson - guitar (2008 to 2016)
- Jeremy “13” Young - bass (2010 to 2014)
- Russell Bullock - drums (2010 - 2016)
- Jared Mosely - bass (2014 - 2016)

== Discography ==
Studio albums

- LVL IV (2004)
- To Live and Die in the Garden of Eden (as Machina) (2012)
- Reveal (2015)

EPs

- Delirium EP (2009)
