= Tucky Williams =

American actress

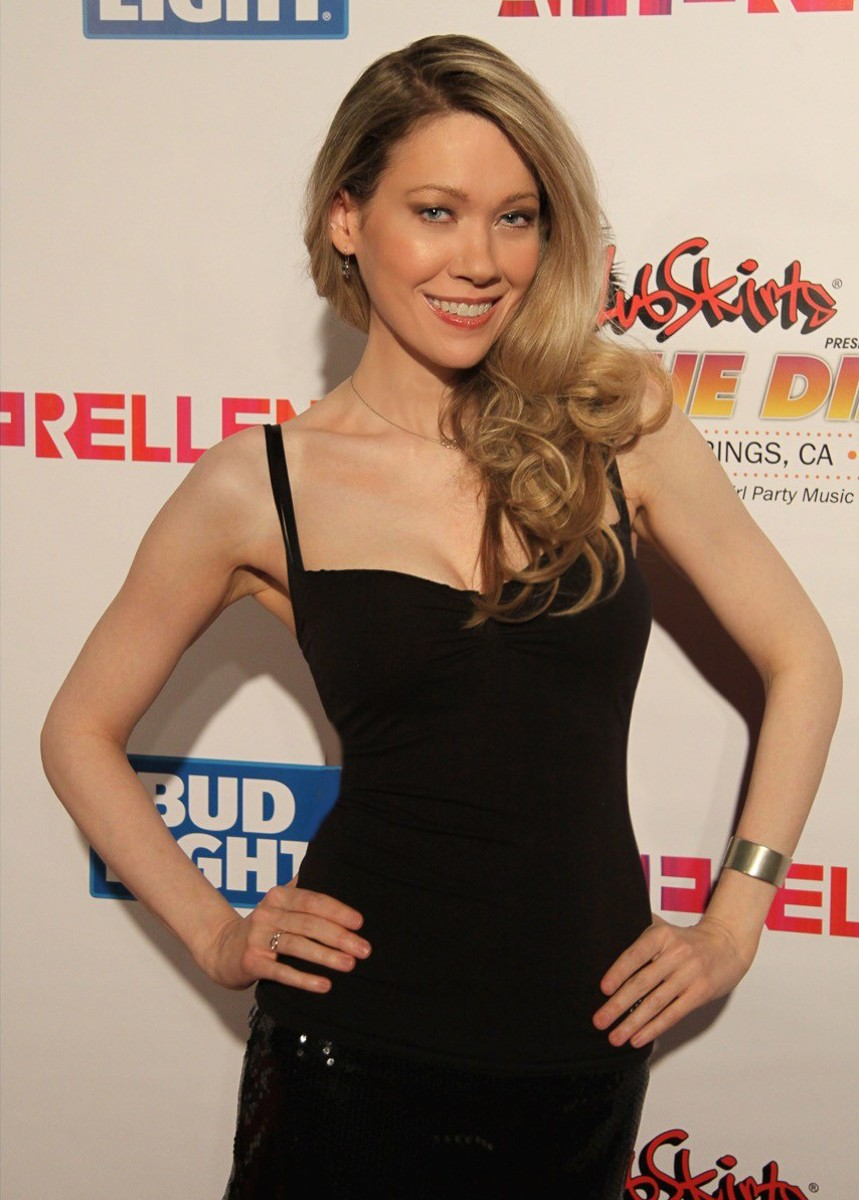
- Born: 26 September 1991 (age 34)
- Education: BA, BS
- Alma mater: University of Kentucky, Mississippi State University
- Occupations: Film maker, actress, screenwriter
- Notable work: Girl/Girl Scene

Tucky Williams is an American director, producer, screenwriter, and actress. She is known for creating and portraying Evan in the Amazon streaming series Girl/Girl Scene.

== Personal life ==
Williams began college at the age of fifteen. She studied meteorology and broadcast journalism at the University of Kentucky and Mississippi State University. As a meteorologist, she has worked on-air for the ABC affiliate station in Lexington, KY. She also works as a yoga instructor.

Williams has been vocal about having epilepsy. She used her experiences with epilepsy as a plot for her character on Girl/Girl Scene.

== Career ==
Williams created, wrote, and executive produced the LGBT-themed web series Girl/Girl Scene. She played the lead character, Evan. Dagger Kiss, a lesbian web series take on the fantasy genre, premiered in 2016. Williams both created it and starred as the protagonist, named Arden.

She made her directorial debut with the short film Juliet and Romeo, a lesbian version of Shakespeare's Romeo and Juliet. She produced and acted in the short film Othello: Desdemona's Death, her second lesbian twist on a Shakespeare play (Othello). She executive produced, wrote, and directed Girl/Girl Scene, a 2019 film based on the series.

Williams began her film acting career in the role of Vix, a zombie slayer, in the cult horror film Dead Moon Rising (2007). She played the lead role of Dana Fontaine in direct-to-video film Shadows Light (2008). She also had featured roles as Becca in Blink (2007), and as Ranger Darcy in Red River (2011).

=== Influences ===
Asked about the extent to which her films draw on her life experience, Williams responded, "I had never seen a show that depicted what life was like for me and my friends. We’re queer and we love it. We don’t wish we were straight – the opposite, in fact. We dress like boys, listen to indie bands, and canoodle with cute girls. I think all good writing has to be autobiographical to some extent."

== Accolades ==
Williams was named as one of The Advocate's "40 Under 40", a list of "budding powerhouses, leaders in media, politics, sports and science ... architects of the next decade."

She won an award for Best Screenplay for her work on Girl/Girl Scene at the World Independent Film Expo.

In 2012, she made the top ten on the AfterEllen "Hot 100", a list of "the hottest 100 women on Earth"

== See also ==
- List of female film and television directors
- List of lesbian filmmakers
- List of LGBT-related films directed by women
