= MewithoutYou discography =

mewithoutYou discography
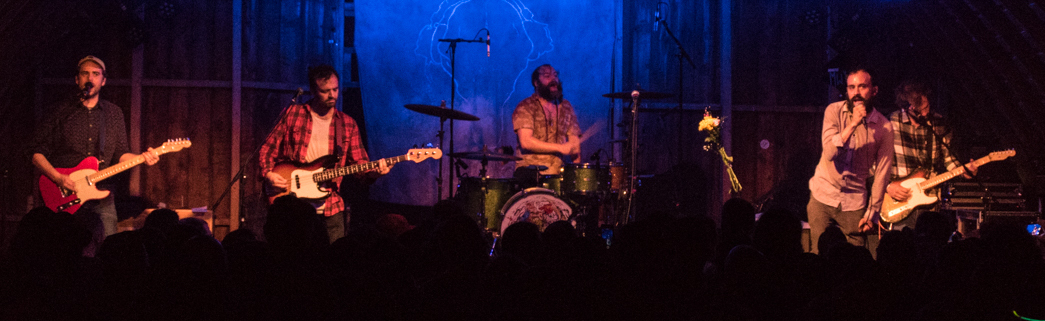
- mewithoutYou performing in 2019
- Studio albums: 7
- EPs: 5
- Live albums: 2
- Music videos: 11
- Live EPs: 2
- Demo EPs: 1
- Appearances: 29

The discography of mewithoutYou, an American rock band, (Note: The genre of mewithoutYou has been described as post-hardcore, emo, indie rock, and folk rock. Additionally, due to the religious themes in some songs and four albums released on Tooth & Nail Records, mewithoutYou has been categorized as Christian rock or Christian punk, which the band denies.) consists of seven studio albums, two live albums, seven extended plays (EPs) or maxi singles, eleven music videos, and twenty-nine appearances on compilation, tribute, soundtrack, and split albums or in video collections. The band was formed in 2001 as a side project to The Operation, an alternative band active from 1999 to 2001 that shared most of its members with mewithoutYou. The debut demo EP by mewithoutYou, Blood Enough For Us All, was released in 2000, the year before the band was officially founded. The first undisputed release by the band was I Never Said That I Was Brave which was released on Kickstart Audio in 2001. Over the next year, the band signed to Tooth & Nail Records and released their debut album, [A→B] Life. The album is post-hardcore with shouted and screamed vocals. In 2004, mewithoutYou released their second album Catch for Us the Foxes, which was their first album to chart, reaching number 13 on the Top Christian Albums chart.

Brother, Sister, mewithoutYou's third album (released in 2006), was moved away from the emo and hardcore punk influences of their earlier work and featured less abrasive vocals by Aaron Weiss. Brother, Sister was the first mewithoutYou album to chart on the Billboard 200. With It's All Crazy! It's All False! It's All a Dream! It's Alright in 2009, the band shifted genres entirely, recording an album that is almost entirely acoustic and has been compared to "campfire songs". The band left Tooth & Nail Records in 2011 and released Ten Stories, a concept album about the crash of a circus train, on their own Pine Street Records in 2012. Ten Stories was mewithoutYou's first and only number one album on the Top Christian Albums chart. The band signed with Run for Cover Records in 2015 and released Pale Horses the same year. They released both their seventh studio album, [Untitled], and their only live album, [A→B] Live, in 2018. The band announced in 2019 that the following year would be their last as "an active band". Due to the COVID-19 pandemic, mewithoutYou postponed their final tour until 2022 and played their last concert on August 20, 2022, in Philadelphia.

== Albums ==
=== Studio albums ===
List of studio albums, with selected chart positions
Title	Details	Peak chart positions			Ref.
Title	Details	US	US Christ	US Indie	Ref.
[A→B] Life	Released: June 18, 2002; Label: Tooth & Nail Records	—	—	—	
Catch for Us the Foxes	Released: October 5, 2004; Label: Tooth & Nail Records	—	13	—	
Brother, Sister	Released: September 26, 2006; Label: Tooth & Nail Records	116	7	—	
It's All Crazy! It's All False! It's All a Dream! It's Alright	Released: May 19, 2009; Label: Tooth & Nail Records	72	3	—	
Ten Stories	Released: May 15, 2012; Label: Pine Street Records	47	1	12	
Pale Horses	Released: June 16, 2015; Label: Run for Cover Records	62	2	3	
[Untitled]	Released: October 5, 2018; Label: Run for Cover Records	—	—	22	
"—" denotes a recording that did not chart or was not released in that territory.

=== Live albums ===
List of live albums, with selected chart positions
Title	Details	Ref.
[A→B] Live	Released: July 6, 2018; Label: Self-released	
Live (vol. One)	Released: November 22, 2024; Label: Pine Street	
Live (vol. Two)	Released: August 8, 2025; Label: Pine Street	

== Extended plays and maxi singles ==
=== Studio extended plays and maxi singles ===
List of extended plays and maxi singles, with selected chart positions
Title	Details	Peak chart positions	Ref.
Title	Details	US Indie	Ref.
I Never Said That I Was Brave	Released: 2001; Label: Kickstart Audio	—	
Other Stories	Released: 2013; Label: Pine Street Records	—	
East Enders Wives	Released: November 28, 2014; Label: Pine Street Records	—	
Pale Horses: Appendix	Released: June 22, 2016; Label: Self-released	—	
[untitled]	Released: August 17, 2018; Label: Run for Cover Records	47	
"—" denotes a recording that did not chart or was not released in that territory.

=== Live extended plays and maxi singles ===
List of live extended plays and maxi singles
Title	Details	Ref.
Daytrotter Session	Released: 2012; Label: Daytrotter	
mewithoutYou Audiotree Sessions	Released: July 6, 2015; Label: Audiotree	

=== Demo extended plays and maxi singles ===
List of demo extended plays and maxi singles
Title	Details	Ref.
Blood Enough For Us All (Note: Blood Enough For Us All was released the year before mewithoutYou officially began and there is some controversy over whether it counts as a release by the band. However, two of the people who played on the album are official members of the band and it was released under the name mewithoutYou.)	Released: 2000; Label: Self-released	

== Music videos ==
List music videos that mewithoutYou has released
Title	Director	Album	Ref.
"Bullet to Binary"	Shane Drake	[A→B] Life	
"January, 1979"	Shane Drake	Catch for Us the Foxes	
"Disaster Tourism"	Casey McBride and Daniel Davison	Catch for Us the Foxes	
"Paper Hanger"	Lex Hallaby	Catch for Us the Foxes	
"Nice & Blue (Pt. Two)"	Shane Drake	Brother, Sister	
"The Fox, The Crow, and The Cookie"	Amy Carrigan and David Bell	It's All Crazy! It's All False! It's All a Dream! It's Alright	
"February, 1878"	Andre Comfort	Ten Stories	
"All Circles"	Michael P. Heneghan	Ten Stories	
"Watermelon Ascot"	Phil Thomas Katt	Pale Horses	
"Red Cow / Dorothy"	Daniel Davison	Pale Horses	
"Julia (or, 'Holy to the LORD' on the Bells of Horses)"	Michael Parks Randa	[Untitled]	

== Appearances on compilations, tributes, soundtracks, and splits ==
=== Music ===
List of compilation, tribute, soundtrack, and split albums on which mewithoutYou has appeared
Year	Title	Track(s)	Ref.
2002	Split with Norma Jean	"Bullet to Binary" and "Gentlemen"	
2002	What Are You Listening To? Hard Rock and Nu-Metal	"Nice & Blue"	
2002	The Ordinary Radicals	"Torches Together"	
2003	The Nail, Vol. 1	"The Ghost"	
2003	Tooth & Nail Tenth Anniversary Box Set	"Bullet To Binary"	
2004	The Nail, Vol. 2	"Gentlemen"	
2004	This Is Solid State, Volume 5	"4 Word Letter"	
2004	A Near Fatal Fall	"Torches Together"	
2004	Music With Attitude, Vol. 67	"January 1979"	
2005	Tooth & Nail Vs Solid State	"January 1979"	
2005	You Can't Handle The Tooth, Vol. 1	"Paper Hanger"	
2005	Punk the Clock Vol. 2	"Torches Together"	
2006	The Cornerstone Player 069	"Nice And Blue Pt. 2"	
2007	Gilead Media 2007 Sampler	"January 1979"	
2007	Friends With Microphones	"Torches Together"	
2007	Tooth & Nail Records: The Ultimate Collection	"January 1979"	
2009	Songs From The Penalty Box Vol. 6	"Every Thought A Thought of You"	
2012	Come As You Are: A 20th Anniversary Tribute To Nirvana's 'Nevermind'	"In Bloom"	
2012	Topshelf Records 2014 Digital Sampler	"Fox's Dream of the Log Flume"	
2014	Split with Circa Survive	"Rainbow Signs (Fa So La Version)"	
2016	Big Scary Monsters Sampler CD	"Red Cow"	
2016	Split with Say Anything	"Cleo's Ferry Cemetery"	
2019	Let’s Just Do It And Be Legends	"Kristy w/ the Sparkling Teeth"	

=== Video ===
List of compilation video collections in which mewithoutYou has appeared
Year	Title	Track(s)	Ref.
2003	This Is Solid State, Vol. 4	"Bullet To Binary"	
2003	The Nail: Tooth & Nail Video, Vol. 8	"Bullet To Binary"	
2005	The Nail: Tooth & Nail Video, Vol. 9	"Disaster Tourism" and "January 1979"	
2005	The Cornerstone Player 060 DVD	"January 1979"	
2006	The Nail, Vol. 3	"Paper Hanger"	
2007	Dominate Vol. 1	"Nice and Blue, Pt.2"	

== See also ==
- List of songs recorded by mewithoutYou
