= List of songs recorded by mewithoutYou =

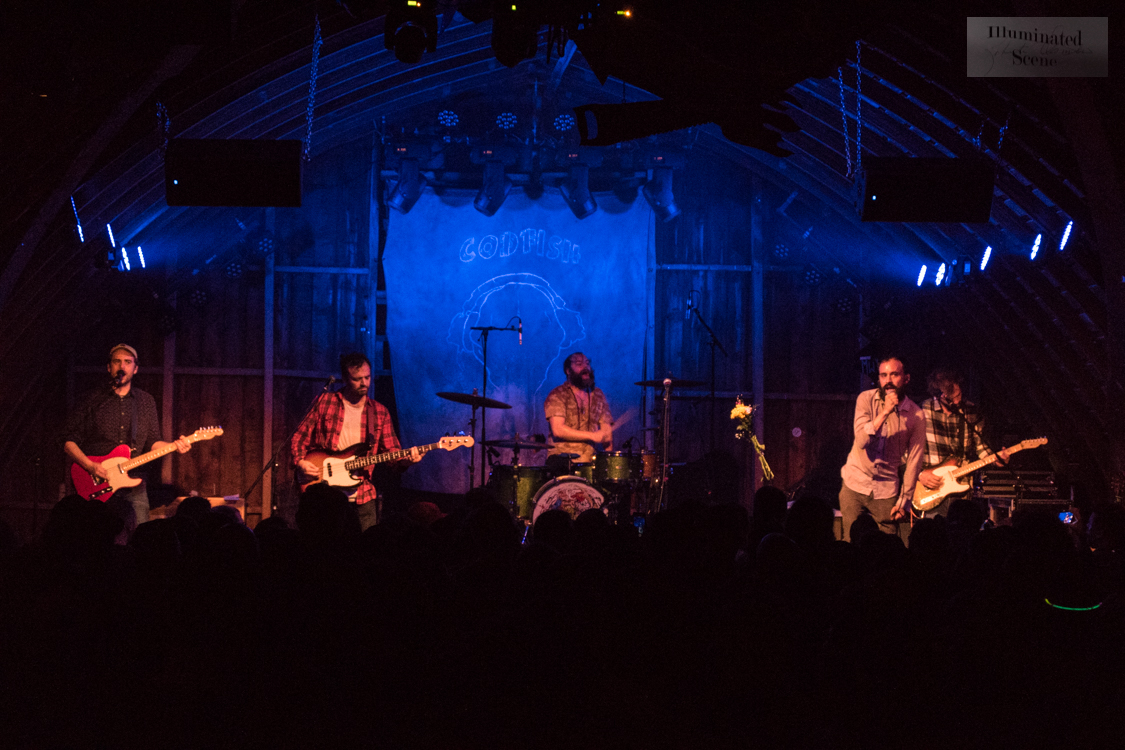
mewithoutYou performing in Maquoketa, Iowa in 2009

The following is a list of songs recorded by mewithoutYou organized by alphabetical order. Next to the song titles is the album, soundtrack or single on which it appears. During their run from 2000 to 2022, the band released 7 studio albums, 1 live album, and 7 extended plays, among other releases.

Contents:	Top – A B C D E F G H I J K L M N O P R S T W Y

== # ==
1. "2,459 Miles" ([Untitled], 2018)
  - "Song #4" (Live (Vol. One), 2024)
2. "9:27a.m., 7/29" ([Untitled], 2018)

== A ==
1. "(A)" ([A→B] Life, 2002)
  - "(A)" ([A→B] Live, 2018)
2. "A Glass Can Only Spill What It Contains" (Brother, Sister, 2006)
3. "A Stick, a Carrot & String" (It's All Crazy! It's All False! It's All a Dream! It's Alright, 2009)
4. "All Circles" (Ten Stories, 2012)
  - "Song #16" (Live (Vol. One), 2024)
5. "Allah, Allah, Allah" (It's All Crazy! It's All False! It's All a Dream! It's Alright, 2009)
  - "Song #15" (Live (Vol. One), 2024)
6. "Another Head for Hydra" ("Another Head for Hydra", 2018)
  - "Another Head for Hydra" ([Untitled], 2018)
7. "Aubergine" (Ten Stories, 2012)
  - "Aubergine" (Daytrotter Session, 2012)
  - "Song #8" (Live (Vol. One), 2024)
8. "August 6th" ([untitled], 2018)

== B ==
1. "(B)" ([A→B] Life, 2002)
  - "(B)" ([A→B] Live, 2018)
2. "Be Still, Child" ([A→B] Life, 2002)
  - "Be Still, Child" ([A→B] Live, 2018)
3. "Bear's Vision of St. Agnes" (Ten Stories, 2012)
  - "Bear's Vision of St. Agnes" (Daytrotter Session, 2012)
4. "Bethlehem, WV" ([untitled], 2018)
5. "Birnam Wood" (Pale Horses, 2015)
6. "Blue Hen" (Pale Horses, 2015)
  - "Blue Hen (Geology Version)" (Pale Horses: Appendix, 2016)
  - "Blue Hen" (Audiotree Live, 2015)
7. "Break on Through (to the Other Side) [pt. Two]" ([Untitled], 2018)
8. "Brownish Spider" (Brother, Sister, 2006)
9. "Bullet to Binary" ([A→B] Life, 2002)
  - "Bullet to Binary" (Norma Jean and mewithoutYou, 2002)
  - "Bullet to Binary" (10th Anniversary Box Set, 2003)
  - "Bullet to Binary" (The Nail: Tooth & Nail Video, Vol. 8, 2003)
  - "Bullet to Binary" (This Is Solid State Volume 4, 2003)
  - "Bullet to Binary" ([A→B] Live, 2018)
  - "Song #1" (Live (vol. One), 2024)
10. "Bullet to Binary (Pt. Two)" (It's All Crazy! It's All False! It's All a Dream! It's Alright, 2009)

== C ==
1. "C-Minor" (Brother, Sister, 2006)
2. "Cardiff Giant" (Ten Stories, 2012)
  - "Song #14" (Live (Vol. One), 2024)
3. "Carousels" (Catch for Us the Foxes, 2004)
4. "Cattail Down" (It's All Crazy! It's All False! It's All a Dream! It's Alright, 2009)
5. "Chapelcross Towns" (Pale Horses: Appendix, 2016)
  - "Chapelcross Towns" (Audiotree Live, 2015)
6. "Chernobyl, 1985" (Pale Horses: Appendix, 2016)
7. "Cities of the Plain" ([untitled], 2018)
8. "Cleo's Ferry Cemetery" ("Cleo's Ferry Cemetery", 2016)
  - "Cleo's Ferry Cemetery" ("Tour Split", 2016)

== D ==
1. "D-Minor" (Pale Horses, 2015)
  - "D-Minor" (Audiotree Live, 2015)
2. "Dirty Air" ([untitled], 2018)
3. "Disaster Tourism" (Catch for Us the Foxes, 2004)
  - "Disaster Tourism" (The Nail: Tooth & Nail Video, Vol. 9, 2005)
  - "Song #10" (Live (Vol. One), 2024)
4. "[dormouse sighs]" ([Untitled], 2018)
5. "Dorothy" (Pale Horses, 2015)
6. "Dying Is Strange and Hard" (I Never Said That I Was Brave, 2001)

== E ==
1. "East Enders Wives" (Ten Stories, 2012)
  - "East Enders Wives" (Daytrotter Session, 2012)
  - "East Enders Wives (Album Version)" ("East Enders Wives", 2014)
  - "East Enders Wives (Demo)" ("East Enders Wives", 2014)
  - "East Enders Wives (Instrumental)" ("East Enders Wives", 2014)
  - "East Enders Wives (Orchestral Version)" ("East Enders Wives", 2014)
  - "East Enders Wives (Remix Instrumental)" ("East Enders Wives", 2014)
  - "East Enders Wives (Remix)" ("East Enders Wives", 2014)
2. "Elephant in the Dock" (Ten Stories, 2012)
3. "Every Thought a Thought of You" (It's All Crazy! It's All False! It's All a Dream! It's Alright, 2009)
  - "Every Thought a Thought Of You" (Fuel Sampler 2009, 2009)
  - "Every Thought a Thought Of You" (Songs From the Penalty Box, Vol. 6, 2009)
4. "Everything Was Beautiful, and Nothing Hurt" ([A→B] Life, 2002)
  - "Everything Was Beautfiul and Nothing Hurt" ([A→B] Live, 2018)
5. "Existential Dread, Six Hours' Time" ([untitled], 2018)

== F ==
1. "Fairfield" (Pale Horses: Appendix, 2016) (Note: A traditional Sacred Harp song, "Come, humble sinner, in whose breast?" (SH1991 #94).)
2. "February, 1878" ("February, 1878", 2012)
  - "February, 1878" (Ten Stories, 2012)
3. "Fig with a Bellyache" (It's All Crazy! It's All False! It's All a Dream! It's Alright, 2009)
4. "Fiji Mermaid" (Ten Stories, 2012)
5. "Flamethrower" (I Never Said That I Was Brave, 2001)
  - "Flamethrower" (Blood Enough for Us All, 2000)
6. "Flee, Thou Matadors!" ([Untitled], 2018)
7. "Four Fires" ("February, 1878", 2012)
  - "Four Fires" (Other Stories, 2013)
  - "Song #17" (Live (Vol. One), 2024)
8. "Four Word Letter" (I Never Said That I Was Brave, 2001)
  - "4 Word Letter" (This Is Solid State Volume 5, 2004)
9. "Four Word Letter (Pt. Two)" (Catch for Us the Foxes, 2004)
10. "Fox's Dream of the Log Flume" (Ten Stories, 2012)
  - "Song #7" (Live (Vol. One), 2024)

== G ==
1. "Gentlemen" ([A→B] Life, 2002)
  - "Gentleman" (Norma Jean and mewithoutYou, 2002)
  - "Gentlemen" (What On Earth?!, 2002)
  - "Gentlemen" (The Nail Volume 2, 2004)
  - "Gentlemen" ([A→B] Live, 2018)
2. "Goodbye, I!" (It's All Crazy! It's All False! It's All a Dream! It's Alright, 2009)
3. "Grist for the Malady Mill" (Ten Stories, 2012)
  - "Song #6" (Live (Vol. One), 2024)

== H ==
1. "Hebrew Children" (Pale Horses: Appendix, 2016) (Note: A traditional Sacred Harp song, "Where are the Hebrew children?" (SH1991 #133).)

== I ==
1. "I Dare You to Pick Someone to Fight Me" (Blood Enough for Us All, 2000)
2. "I Never Said That I Was Brave" (I Never Said That I Was Brave, 2001)
  - "I Never Said That I Was Brave" ([A→B] Life, 2002)
  - "I Never Said That I Was Brave" ([A→B] Live, 2018)
3. "In a Market Dimly Lit" (Brother, Sister, 2006)
4. "In a Sweater Poorly Knit" (Brother, Sister, 2006)
  - "In a Sweater Poorly Knit (Demo Version)" ("Nice and Blue (Pt. Two)", 2007)
  - "In a Sweater Poorly Knit" ([A→B] Live, 2018)
5. "In Bloom" (Come as You Are: A 20th Anniversary Tribute to Nirvana's Nevermind, 2011) (Note: Cover of Nirvana's "In Bloom.")

== J ==
1. "January 1979" (Catch for Us the Foxes, 2004)
  - "January 1979" ("January 1979", 2005)
  - "January 1979" (The Nail: Tooth & Nail Video, Vol. 9, 2005)
  - "January 1979" (Tooth & Nail vs. Solid State - The Videos, 2005)
  - "January 1979" (Tooth and Nail vs. Solid State, 2005)
  - "January 1979" (The Ultimate Collection, 2008)
  - "January 1979" ([A→B] Live, 2018)
2. "Juilian the Onion" (Other Stories, 2013)
3. "Julia (or, 'Holy to the LORD' on the Bells of Horses)" ("Julia (or, 'Holy to the LORD' on the Bells of Horses)", 2018)
  - "Julia (or, 'Holy to the LORD' on the Bells of Horses)" ([Untitled], 2018)

== K ==
1. "Kristy w/ the Sparkling Teeth" (Let's Just Do It and Be Legends, 2019)
  - "Kristy w/ the Sparkling Teeth" ([untitled], 2018)

== L ==
1. "Leaf" (Catch for Us the Foxes, 2004)
2. "Lilac Queen" (Pale Horses, 2015)

== M ==
1. "Magic Lantern Days" (Pale Horses, 2015)
  - "Magic Lantern Days" (Audiotree Live, 2015)
  - "Magic Lantern Days (Acoustic)" ([A→B] Live, 2018)
2. "Messes of Men" (Brother, Sister, 2006)
3. "Mexican War Streets" (Pale Horses, 2015)
  - "Mexican War Streets (Revisited)" (Pale Horses: Appendix, 2016)
4. "Michael, Row Your Boat Ashore" ([Untitled], 2018)
5. "My Exit, Unfair" (Catch for Us the Foxes, 2004)

== N ==
1. "New Wine, New Skins" ([Untitled], 2018)
2. "Nice and Blue" ([A→B] Life, 2002)
  - "Nice and Blue" (What Are You Listening To?: Hard Rock and Nu-Metal, 2002) (Note: Incorrectly labelled as "[A→B] Life.")
  - "Nice and Blue" ([A→B] Live, 2018)
  - "Song #2" (Live (Vol. One), 2024)
3. "Nice and Blue (Pt. Two)" (Brother, Sister, 2006)
  - "Nice and Blue (Pt. Two)" ("Nice and Blue (Pt. Two)", 2007)
  - "Nice and Blue (Pt. Two)" (Dominate Volume One, 2007)
  - "Nice and Blue (Pt. Two)" ([A→B] Live, 2018)
  - "Song #9" (Live (Vol. One), 2024)
4. "Nine Stories" (Ten Stories, 2012)

== O ==
1. "O, Porcupine" (Brother, Sister, 2006)
  - "Song #13" (Live (Vol. One), 2024) (Note: Together with "Yellow Spider.")
2. "Orange Spider" (Brother, Sister, 2006)

== P ==
1. "Pale Horse" (Pale Horses, 2015)
  - "Pale Horse" (Audiotree Live, 2015)
2. "Paper Hanger" (Catch for Us the Foxes, 2004)
  - "Paper-Hanger" ("Paper-Hanger", 2005)
  - "Song #3" (Live (Vol. One), 2024)

== R ==
1. "Rainbow Signs" (Pale Horses, 2015)
  - "Rainbow Signs (Fa So La Version)" ("Awake in a Dream", 2016)
2. "Red Cow" ("Red Cow", 2015)
  - "Red Cow" (Pale Horses, 2015)
  - "Red Cow" (Audiotree Live, 2015)
  - "Red Cow" (Audiotree.tv Free 2015 Compilation, 2015)
  - "Red Cow (Golden Calf Version)" (Pale Horses: Appendix, 2016)
  - "Red Cow" ([A→B] Live, 2018)

== S ==
1. "Seven Sisters" (Catch for Us the Foxes, 2004)
2. "Silencer" ([A→B] Life, 2002)
  - "Silencer" ([A→B] Live, 2018)
3. "Son of a Widow" (Catch for Us the Foxes, 2004)
  - "Son of a Widow" ([A→B] Live, 2018)

== T ==
1. "The Angel of Death Came to David's Room" (It's All Crazy! It's All False! It's All a Dream! It's Alright, 2009)
  - "The Angel of Death Came to David's Room" (Daytrotter Session, 2012)
2. "The Comfort You Give Is Only Torment" (Blood Enough for Us All, 2000)
3. "The Cure for Pain" ([A→B] Life, 2002)
  - "The Cure for Pain" ([A→B] Live, 2018)
4. "The Dryness and the Rain" (Brother, Sister, 2006)
5. "The Fox, the Crow and the Cookie" ("The Fox, the Crow and the Cookie", 2009)
  - "The Fox, the Crow and the Cookie" (It's All Crazy! It's All False! It's All a Dream! It's Alright, 2009)
  - "The Fox, the Crow, and the Cookie (Acoustic)" ([A→B] Live, 2018)
6. "The Ghost" ([A→B] Life, 2002)
  - "The Ghost" (The Nail Volume One, 2003)
  - "The Ghost" ([A→B] Live, 2018)
7. "The King Beetle on a Coconut Estate" (It's All Crazy! It's All False! It's All a Dream! It's Alright, 2009)
8. "The Soviet" (Catch for Us the Foxes, 2004)
9. "The Sun and the Moon" (Brother, Sister, 2006)
10. "There Is Hope for a Tree Cut Down" (Blood Enough for Us All, 2000)
11. "Tie Me Up! Untie Me!" (Catch for Us the Foxes, 2004)
  - "Song #11" (Live (Vol. One), 2024)
12. "Timothy Hay" (It's All Crazy! It's All False! It's All a Dream! It's Alright, 2009)
  - "Song #12" (Live (Vol. One), 2024)
13. "Torches Together" (Catch for Us the Foxes, 2004)
  - "Torches Together" ([A→B] Live, 2018)
14. "Tortoises All the Way Down" ([Untitled], 2018)

== W ==
1. "Watermelon Ascot" (Pale Horses, 2015)
2. "We Know Who Our Enemies Are" (I Never Said That I Was Brave, 2001)
  - "We Know who Our Enemies Are" (Furnace Fest 2001, 2001)
  - "We Know Who Our Enemies Are" ([A→B] Life, 2002)
  - "We Know who Our Enemies Are" (Songs From the Penalty Box, Vol. 5, 2002)
  - "We Know Who Our Enemies Are" ([A→B] Live, 2018)
3. "Wendy & Betsy" ([Untitled], 2018)
  - "Song #5" (Live (Vol. One), 2024)
4. "Werewolf King (Demo)" (Pale Horses: Appendix, 2016)
5. "Winter Solstice" ([Untitled], 2018)
  - "Winter Solstice" (alt. version) ([untitled], 2018)
6. "Wolf Am I! (and Shadow)" (Brother, Sister, 2006)
  - "Wolf Am I! (And Shadow)" ([A→B] Live, 2018)
7. "Working in a Factory" (Blood Enough for Us All, 2000)

== Y ==
1. "Yellow Spider" (Brother, Sister, 2006)
  - "Song #13" (Live (Vol. One), 2024) (Note: Together with "O, Porcupine.")

== See also ==
- mewithoutYou discography
