= Little Wars (disambiguation) =

Little Wars is a game created by H. G. Wells.

Little Wars may also refer to:

- Little Wars (album), a 2008 album by Unwed Sailor
- Little Wars (film), a 1982 Lebanese film
- Little Wars (magazine), a miniature wargaming magazine

== See also ==
- Little War (disambiguation)
