= The Marionette and the Music Box =

Studio album by Unwed Sailor
- Released: 2003
- Genre: Instrumental rock, ambient
- Length: 37:46
- Label: Burnt Toast Vinyl

Unwed Sailor chronology
The Magic Hedge (2002)	The Marionette and the Music Box (2003)	Circles (2006)

Professional ratings
Review scores
Source	Rating
AllMusic	4/5 stars
Pitchfork Media	6.1/10

The Marionette and the Music Box is a 2003 concept album by the instrumental rock group Unwed Sailor. The album consists of 17 instrumental tracks, each of which coincide with a painting by graphic artist Jamie Hunt in the included booklet. The paintings and song titles tell the story of a marionette who journeys out of his cottage and discovers a music box. The pages following their initial meeting go on to detail the entrance of a mysterious unicorn, the marionette's subsequent "enchantment," his "hopeless pursuit" of the unicorn, and eventually his return to the open arms of the music box.

The album was released on compact disc, vinyl, and also in a hardcover book that included large versions of all the paintings in the CD and vinyl booklets, along with the compact disc attached to the back cover.

== Critical reception ==
The A.V. Club wrote that "for all [the album's] conceptual weightiness and lofty artistic goals, it's sublime and endlessly rewarding as background music, too." Exclaim! called The Marionette and the Music Box an "album of subtlety and focus ... just plain soothing on the ears. One of the best records of the year."

== Track listing ==
1. "Morning in the Forest" – 0:51
2. "The Marionette's Cottage" – 1:09
3. "Cuckoo Clocks. The Call of the Windmill" – 2:39
4. "The Windmill's Tale of the Music Box Floats Through the Air. Riding the Windmill" – 5:32
5. "The Music Box" – 1:22
6. "In Search of the Music Box" – 1:37
7. "The Meeting of the Marionette and the Music Box" – 0:55
8. "The Floating Waltz" – 1:14
9. "At Peace in the Forest" – 1:12
10. "Asleep in the Forest" - 2:28
11. "Behold the Unicorn!" – 0:26
12. "The Distraction. A Conflict of Interest. Enchanted by the Unicorn" – 3:37
13. "The Separation. A Hopeless Pursuit" – 2:27
14. "Lost and Alone" – 5:37
15. "The Return to Open Arms" – 0:52
16. "The Embrace" – 1:10
17. "Jubilee" – 4:38
