= Timbre (disambiguation) =

Timbre is the perceived sound quality of a musical note, sound or tone.

It may also refer to:

- Timbre (album), by Sophie B. Hawkins
- Timbres magazine, a philately magazine|
- Timbre Cierpke, an American musician and band
