= Foxhole (band) =

American band

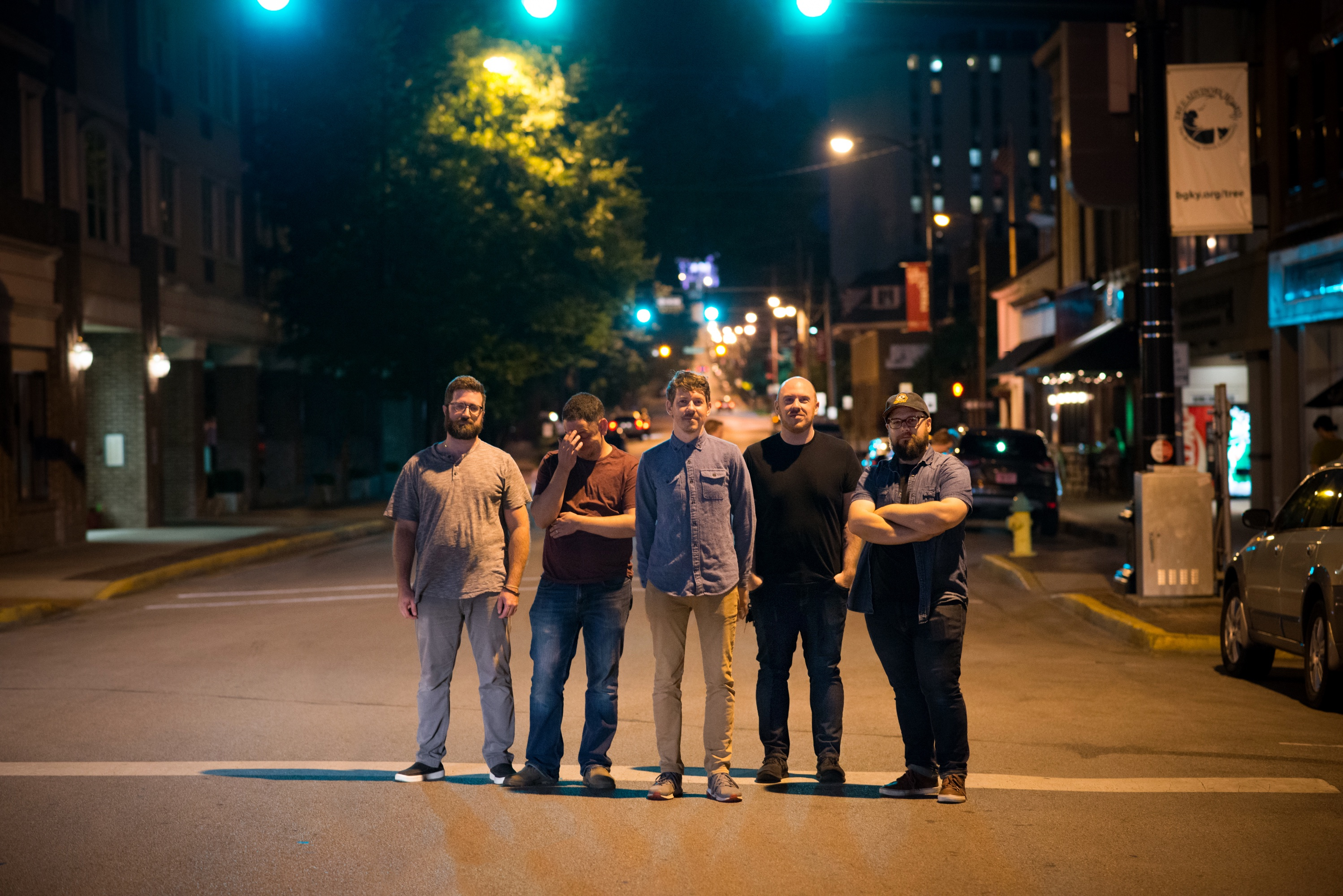

Background information
- Origin: United States
- Genres: Post-rock
- Years active: 2000–present
- Label: Burnt Toast Vinyl
- Members: Derek Holt; Adam Moore; Greg Leppert; R. Justin Shepherd; Chris Vicari

Foxhole is a post-rock band from Bowling Green, Kentucky. Founded in November 2000 on the campus of Western Kentucky University, the group was heavily influenced by other Kentucky-linked bands such as Slint and June of 44. Foxhole has released three albums on Philadelphia's Burnt Toast Vinyl label and in December 2018 their latest LP, Well Kept Thing, was Grammy-nominated for "Best Recording Package."

== About ==
The band initially focused on melding experimental sounds with melody. A staple of early performances was a fully improvised song (designated "X") randomly inserted into the set list, and which often featured several homemade instruments, including the "juggophone", "shatterophone", "topophone", and "pyrophone", which utilized the sounds of beating water jugs, breaking bottles, clinking pot tops, and micing fireworks, respectively. They also made frequent use of the sounds of a signal generator. Gradually, Foxhole integrated slightly more traditional song structures and held to typical instruments, dispensing mostly with the use of gimmick instrumentation. Songs typically featured a gradual build in intensity, and featured rare and unaugmented vocals.

2002 brought EP1, the debut Foxhole release. 500 CDs were pressed and packaged in hand-stitched canvas and embossed cardstock. That summer, the band embarked on a two-week tour across the Eastern half of the United States. In spring 2003 Foxhole released a second EP, EP2:X, a compilation of "X" improvisations recorded mostly during the previous summer's tour. It too was hand packaged and screenprinted.

As Foxhole continued to change musically, the lineup also changed. Founding member Nathan McBroom left the band in December 2003; 2004 brought on a partnership with Selah Records, from Lansing, MI. Selah funded the release of the Foxhole's first full-length. Recorded by Greg at the church which doubled as the band's rehearsal space, We The Wintering Tree was a monumental undertaking for the band. Tim Bushong of T-Bush Record Plant mixed the album, and it was mastered at John Golden Mastering. 1000 copies of We the Wintering Tree were released in late 2004 and packaged in letterpress-printed white cardstock. Shortly after the album's release, Matt Wilson left the band, also on good terms. Alex O'Nan, drummer for Louisville "math-rock" band, Of Asaph, filled in for several shows, as did Adam Tanaka, formerly of the hardcore band With Blood Comes Beauty. In January 2005 the band found a permanent replacement in Jason Torrence, drummer for Nashville Americana act God's Lonely Man.

As writing for another EP began, Foxhole also increased the frequency of its live performances. In May 2006 they released Push/Pull on Philadelphia's Burnt Toast Vinyl, after roughly 18 months of recording and pre-production. Recorded by Torrence and Leppert and mixed and mastered by Torrence, the album was thematically inspired by videographer and band friend Aaron Marrs' death at sea. The complexity and additional production on Push/Pull prompted the band to add a sixth member, Brian Toppenberg, to augment live shows.

In early 2010, Foxhole announced plans to return from their 4-year long hiatus and record a new album; drummer Chris Vicari (formerly of Nashville post-rock group Maps) replaced Torrence around this time. The band set to work recording at Nashville's Brown Owl Studio in October 2010, with former drummer Torrence serving as lead engineer; however, due to a variety of life events that saw the members disperse to locales including Austin, TX, Louisville, KY and New York City, the sessions were left to simmer for the next few years.

In December 2016, Foxhole gathered back in Bowling Green to revisit the recordings, undertaking rearranging and additional recording at Tyler Cook's The Refinery recording studio just blocks away from Shepherd's home; Leppert recorded the final portions in a cabin in Cambridge, Mass., in April 2017. The finished album, Well Kept Thing, was released on September 22, 2018, on Burnt Toast Vinyl. It was mixed by Grammy-winning engineer Stephen Roessner, and mastered by Shellac's Bob Weston at Chicago Mastering Service. In December 2018, Well Kept Thing was nominated for a Grammy for "Best Recording Package."

== Members ==
- Derek Holt
- Adam Moore
- Greg Leppert
- R. Justin Shepherd
- Chris Vicari

=== Former members and participants ===
- Nathan McBroom (Founding Member) – Guitar, Bass
- Matthew Wilson (Founding Member) – Drums
- Alex O'Nan – Drums
- Adam Tanaka – Drums
- Joey Wilcox – Percussion
- Jason Torrence – Drums
- Brian Toppenberg — Electronics
- Brittany Jarboe Jennings — Cello on Push/Pull
- Timbre Cierpke — Vocals on Well Kept Thing

== Releases ==
- EP1 (2002)
- EP2:X (2003)
- We the Wintering Tree (Burnt Toast Vinyl, 2004)
- Push/Pull EP (Burnt Toast Vinyl, 2006)
- Well Kept Thing (Burnt Toast Vinyl, 2018)

== Trivia ==
- In January 2017, NPR's Morning Edition used two Foxhole songs ("Spectacle" and "The End of Dying" from their album We the Wintering Tree). NPR Morning Edition
- Foxhole's song "Wake Up Get Dressed We're Sinking" was featured in the 2012 movie "The Zipper".
- The Foxhole song "The End of Dying" can be heard on a 2006 promotional BMX DVD distributed by the major skate shoe company etnies.
- "The End of Dying" was also featured (though shortened) on Mono Vs. Stereo Records' national release "The Revolution Will Begin In The Blink Of An Eye", along with House of Heroes, Anathallo, Aireline, and Matthew Thiessen of Relient K.
- Paul Hinojos of the band Sparta chose Foxhole's We the Wintering Tree as one of his ten favorite albums of 2004.
- Foxhole's album We the Wintering Tree was recommended by independent record review site Decoy Music as one of the 10 best instrumental records of 2004.
