= Nice and Blue (Pt. Two) =

Nice and Blue (pt. Two)

EP by mewithoutYou
- Released: September 24, 2007
- Recorded: 2006
- Genre: Indie rock, experimental rock
- Label: Strange Addiction Records

mewithoutYou's Nice and Blue (pt. Two) 7" vinyl was released in the UK on Strange Addiction Records on September 24, 2007. It features the song "Nice and Blue (Pt. 2)" from the mewithoutYou album "Brother, Sister", released worldwide in October, 2006. The B-Side is a demo of the song "In A Sweater Poorly Knit" from the mewithoutYou album "Brother, Sister".

- A Side - Nice and Blue (Pt. 2)
- B Side - In A Sweater Poorly Knit (Demo Version)

== Sources ==
- http://www.myspace.com/strangeaddictionrecords
- http://www.myspace.com/mewithoutyou
- http://www.allmusicimport.com/1160395.html
