= Unwed Sailor =

American band

- Johnathon Ford of Unwed Sailor

Background information
- Origin: Seattle, Washington, U.S.
- Genres: Instrumental rock, ambient, post-rock, dream pop, shoegaze
- Years active: 1998–present
- Labels: Burnt Toast, Gentlemen, Spartan Records, Current Taste
- Members: Johnathon Ford; Matthew Putman; David Swatzell; Patrick McGill
- Website: www.unwedsailor.net

Unwed Sailor is an American, mostly instrumental band, formed in 1998 by Johnathon Ford, with recordings that juggle influences from instrumental rock, post rock, dream pop, shoegaze, 80's pop and ambient drones. The band's touring and recording lineups have largely been in rotation over the years, with the core member being bassist Ford. Unwed Sailor has consistently toured throughout the United States and Europe since its inception in 1998.

== History ==
Ford was initially a band member of Roadside Monument and Pedro the Lion, prior to the formation of Unwed Sailor, which he founded in Seattle, U.S. In a band biography on their SoundCloud profile, the origin of the band is explained: "Pulling towards a bass guitar-oriented sound, the songs he had begun to craft did not fully feel right for Roadside Monument, thus the unbeknownst predestined forming of Unwed Sailor."

The band's first release was the Firecracker EP, recorded in Seattle after Ford left Pedro the Lion—performing on their debut album—and before he relocated to Chicago, U.S. Ford invited friends David Bazan (Pedro the Lion), K.C. Wescott (The Vogue) and Melissa Palladino (Danielson Famile) to assist with the recording of the inaugural Unwed Sailor EP. Recorded by Blake Wescott in September 1998 at Casa Recording Co., Firecracker was released on the Made In Mexico record label, and then on Burnt Toast Vinyl. Mike DaRonco of AllMusic praised the EP for being "Beautifully crafted pop that doesn't utter a single word" and concluded that "Unlike fellow instrumental indie outlet Tristeza, Unwed Sailor can be appreciated as something other than background music.

Ford then worked with Nic Tse, Dan Burton (Early Day Miners), Joe Brumley (Early Day Miners) and Matthew Johnson (Roadside Monument) to record Unwed Sailor's debut full-length studio album, The Faithful Anchor. The album was recorded and mixed in Bloomington, Indiana, U.S. during October and December 2000, and was released in the U.S. on September 10, 2001 on the Lovesick Recordings label. The Faithful Anchor featured eight instrumental pieces and one song with vocals by bassist Johnathon Ford: "The Quiet Hour".

Unwed Sailor released a joint project with Early Day Miners and photographer Chris Bennett in March 2002. Entitled Stateless, the recording is a score by the two bands to accompany Bennett's Super 8 footage, filmed on trips across the U.S. and Europe.

The Unwed Sailor The Marionette and the Music Box concept album was then released on Burnt Toast Vinyl in August 2003 as a companion piece to the Jamie Hunt illustrated children's book of the same name. Ford explained in 2010 that the album was their most experimental recording at the time:

We literally created our own sounds and instruments for that record. It was very much like creating a movie soundtrack—just being in a room with a couple of random objects and using them to create the sound another object would make. Like spinning quarters on a table to get the sound a clock would make if it was being wound, or rolling an old toy car across a picnic table to simulate the sound of an old windmill. I am fascinated with that kind of thing.

Writing for Pitchfork, Bill Morris concluded his review of the album with the statement: "Ultimately, I see the album as a moving away from one strength in favor of developing another."

== Touring ==
Since inception, the band has toured with musical acts such as Pedro the Lion, Low, Sufjan Stevens, Minus the Bear, Battles, The Appleseed Cast and Beach House.

== Collaborators ==
The following artists have played with Unwed Sailor:

- David Bazan (Pedro the Lion)
- K.C. Wescott (The Vogue)
- Melissa Palladino (Danielson Famile)
- Nic Tse played guitar on The Faithful Anchor, and "The Marionette & The Music Box"
- Dan Burton (Early Day Miners) recorded, mixed, and performed on The Faithful Anchor, The White Ox and the Circles Ep.
- Matt Johnson performed on The Faithful Anchor.
- Matthew Putman performed on The Marionette & The Music Box Little Wars, Heavy Age, Look Alive, Truth or Consequences, Mute the Charm, Underwater Over There, and Cruel Entertainment.
- Brooks Tipton performed on Little Wars and was the touring keyboardist from 2003 to 2009

Nicholas Tse Jo-Yum (born September 18, 1977, not to be confused with singer and actor Nicholas Tse) is an indie rock guitarist and songwriter from Hong Kong, and was a key player in Unwed Sailor between 1999 and 2003.

• David Swatzell (member of Unwed Sailor since 2017) performed on Heavy Age, Look Alive, Truth or Consequences, Mute the Charm, Underwater Over There, and Cruel Entertainment.

== Side projects ==
In 2001 Ford collaborated on the Circle of Birds project with Ester Drang and members of Oklahoma country band Lasso.

== Personal life ==
Ford was born in the U.S. state of Oklahoma and in 2014 is a resident of the state's second-largest city Tulsa.

== Discography ==
=== Albums ===
- The Faithful Anchor (Burnt Toast Vinyl, 2001)
  Track listing:
1. "Last Goodbyes" – 3:36
2. "The House of Hopes...Dreams...and Wishes" – 3:36
3. "The Faithful Anchor" – 3:29
4. "Our Nights" – 6:17
5. "Golden Cities" – 4:23
6. "Ruby's Wishes" – 3:19
7. "In the Presence of Thrones" – 2:35
8. "Riddle of Stars" – 3:05
9. "The Quiet Hour" – 6:17
- Stateless, with Early Day Miners (The Great Vitamin Mystery, 2002)
  Track listing:
1. "The Ninth Ward" – 8:00
2. "Scandinavian Comfort" – 7:36
3. "Treeline" – 4:17
4. "Mosaic" – 2:55
5. "Chandelier" – 7:52
- The Marionette and the Music Box (2003)
  Track listing:
1. "Morning in the Forest" – 0:51
2. "The Marionette's Cottage" – 1:09
3. "Cuckoo Clocks. The Call of the Windmill" – 2:39
4. "The Windmill's Tale of the Music Box Floats Through the Air. Riding the Windmill" – 5:32
5. "The Music Box" – 1:22
6. "In Search of the Music Box" – 1:37
7. "The Meeting of the Marionette and the Music Box" – 0:55
8. "The Floating Waltz" – 1:14
9. "At Peace in the Forest" – 1:12
10. "Asleep in the Forest" - 2:28
11. "Behold the Unicorn!" – 0:26
12. "The Distraction. A Conflict of Interest. Enchanted by the Unicorn" – 3:37
13. "The Separation. A Hopeless Pursuit" – 2:27
14. "Lost and Alone" – 5:37
15. "The Return to Open Arms" – 0:52
16. "The Embrace" – 1:10
17. "Jubilee" – 4:38
- The White Ox (Burnt Toast Vinyl, 2006)
  Track listing:
1. "Shadows"
2. "Gila"
3. "Numbers"
4. "Night Diamond"
5. "Pelican"
6. "The End"
- Little Wars (Burnt Toast Vinyl, 2008)
  Track listing:
1. "Copper Islands"
2. "Little Wars"
3. "The Garden"
4. "Aurora"
5. "Campanile"
6. "Echo Roads"
7. "Nauvoo"
8. "Lonely Bulls"
9. "Numeral"
- Heavy Age (2019)
  Track listing:
1. "Indian Paintbrush"
2. "Moon Coin"
3. "ACAXAO"
4. "Heavy Age"
5. "Jealous Heart"
6. "Disintegrate"
7. "Nova"
8. "Ovid"
9. "Thunderbird"
10. "Indian Ocean"
11. "When You Want Me There"
- Look Alive (2020)
  Track listing:
1. "Glaring"
2. "Look Alive"
3. "Camino Reel"
4. "Gone Jungle (GJ Mix)"
5. "Retrograde"
6. "Spring Theory"
7. "Haze"
- Truth or Consequences (2020)
  Track listing:
1. "Blitz"
2. "Palladora"
3. "Lilith"
4. "Ajo"
5. "Voodoo Roux"
6. "Truth or Consequences"
7. "Fellsway"
8. "Dark of the Morning"
- Mute the Charm (2023)
  Track listing:
1. "Windy City Dreams”
2. "Mais Oui”
3. "Let Me Away”
4. "London Fog”
5. "Sugar Sand”
6. "Bitte’ End”
7. "Cold Gold”
8. "Western Dime”
9. ”Mute the Charm”

• Underwater Over There (2024)

• Cruel Entertainment (2025)

=== EPs ===
- Firecracker EP (Burnt Toast Vinyl, 1999)
  Track listing:
1. "Firecracker" – 2:36
2. "Ruby's Wishes" – 3:03
3. "Snowcaps" – 3:12
4. "Once in a Blue Moon" – 4:12
- Circle of Birds EP, with Lasso and Ester Drang (Burnt Toast Vinyl, 2001)
  Track listing:
1. "Old Ironside" - 3:24
2. "Circle of Birds" - 7:01
3. "Good Fortune at Harbor Freight" - 7:09
- Circles (Burnt Toast Vinyl, 2006)
  Track listing:
1. "Circles 1: Mist" – 11:09
2. "Circles 2: Mesa" – 5:16
- Tour EP (self-released, 2011)
  Track listing:
1. "Once in a Blue Moon (2011)" - 3:55
2. "Copper Islands (2011)" - 5:39
3. "Firecracker (2011)" - 4:00
4. "Oaxaca" - 4:14
5. "Bohemia" - 7:24
- Take a Minute (Current Taste, 2017)
  Track listing:
1. "Take a Minute"
2. "Internal Reality"
3. "The Headlands"
4. "Night Nest"
5. "The Other Way"

=== Singles ===
- "The Magic Hedge" 7-inch (2002)
- "Gone Jungle" (2019)
