= Brother, Sister =

Studio album by MewithoutYou
- Released: September 26, 2006
- Recorded: Seagrass Studios, Los Angeles, California
- Genre: Indie rock, experimental rock
- Length: 43:39
- Label: Tooth & Nail, Burnt Toast
- Producer: Brad Wood

MewithoutYou chronology
Catch for Us the Foxes (2004)	Brother, Sister (2006)	It's All Crazy! It's All False! It's All a Dream! It's Alright (2009)

Professional ratings
Review scores
Source	Rating
AbsolutePunk.net	(90%)
AllMusic	3/5 stars
Drowned in Sound	(8/10)
Jesus Freak Hideout	5/5 stars
Spin	3.5 /5 stars
Sputnikmusic	(5/5)

Brother, Sister is the third studio album by indie rock band mewithoutYou, released on September 26, 2006 through Tooth & Nail Records. It features guest vocal and instrumental appearances by several artists, including Jeremy Enigk (of Sunny Day Real Estate), harpist Timbre, and members of Anathallo and the Psalters. From August 9, 2007, Burnt Toast Vinyl were taking pre-orders for an LP-format version of the album. The album features an abundance of symbolism, much of which is tied to animals; at least one can be found in the lyrics of each track.

Brother, Sister reached a peak position of number 116 on the Billboard 200 on October 14, 2006.

The cover art is by artist Vasily Kafanov.

The album's title comes from a verse in the Bhagavad Gita.

== Track listing ==
All tracks are written by MewithoutYou.

No.	Title	Length
1.	"Messes of Men"	3:52
2.	"The Dryness and the Rain" (guest vocals by Jeremy Enigk)	2:57
3.	"Wolf Am I! (and Shadow)"	2:36
4.	"Yellow Spider"	1:10
5.	"A Glass Can Only Spill What It Contains"	3:45
6.	"Nice and Blue (Pt. Two)"	3:43
7.	"The Sun and the Moon"	5:15
8.	"Orange Spider"	1:10
9.	"C-Minor"	3:21
10.	"In a Market Dimly Lit"	4:27
11.	"O, Porcupine" (Guest vocals by Jeremy Enigk)	4:31
12.	"Brownish Spider" (featuring guest harpist Timbre)	1:19
13.	"In a Sweater Poorly Knit" (featuring guest harpist Timbre)	5:26
14.	"January 1979" (UK bonus track)	3:27

== Personnel ==
- Greg Jehanian – bass, background vocals
- Christopher Kleinberg – guitar, background vocals
- Richard Mazzotta – drums, percussion
- Aaron Weiss – lead vocals, spoken word
- Michael Weiss – guitar, background vocals
- Josh Bender – background vocals
- Andrew Dost – flugelhorn
- Jeremy Enigk – vocals
- Orlando Greenhill – upright bass
- Timbre – harp
- Bret Wallin – trombone
- Chick Wolverton – melodica
- Brad Wood – melodica

=== Technical personnel ===
- Michael Almquist - Spider song sequencer
- Chris Crisman – photography
- Chad Johnson – A&R
- Emily Lazar – mastering
- Jason Powers – art direction, design, illustrations
- Brad Wood – producer, engineer, mixing
