= Offshore (album) =

Studio album by Early Day Miners
- Released: August 22, 2006
- Recorded: May 2005–December 2005
- Studio: Grotto Home Studio in Bloomington, Indiana and Old Mt. Gilead Church in Mount Gilead, North Carolina
- Genre: Ambient, alternative rock, slowcore, post-rock, shoegaze
- Length: 37:34
- Label: Secretly Canadian
- Producer: John McEntire

Early Day Miners chronology
All Harm Ends Here (2005)	Offshore (2006)	The Treatment (2009)

Professional ratings
Review scores
Source	Rating
Allmusic	4/5 stars
Pitchfork Media	5.8
Spacelab	4.3/5 stars

Offshore is the fifth full-length album by Early Day Miners, released in 2006 on Secretly Canadian Records. Offshore is a continuous six-song exploration of the musical and lyrical themes presented in the band's song "Offshore", from their 2002 album Let Us Garlands Bring.

== Track listing ==
1. "Land of Pale Saints" – 9:11
2. "Deserter" – 4:07
3. "Sans Revival" – 4:29
4. "Return of the Native" – 3:39
5. "Silent Tents" – 7:05
6. "Hymn Beneath the Palisades" – 9:03

== Personnel ==
- Dan Burton: vocals, guitar
- Joseph Brumley: guitar
- Darin Gray: prepared bass
- Matt Griffin: drums
- Dan Matz: guitar
- Jonathan Richardson: bass
- Jonathan Ford: bass
- Amber Webber: vocals on "Return of the Native"
