= All Harm Ends Here =

Studio album by Early Day Miners
- Released: January 18, 2005
- Recorded: May 2004
- Studio: Old Mt. Gilead Church in Mount Gilead, North Carolina
- Genre: Alternative rock Indie rock Sadcore; Slowcore; Shoegazing; Post-Rock
- Length: 39:53
- Label: Secretly Canadian
- Producer: Early Day Miners

Early Day Miners chronology
Sonograph EP (2004)	All Harm Ends Here (2005)	Offshore (2006)

Professional ratings
Review scores
Source	Rating
Allmusic	3.5/5 stars
Pitchfork Media	6.3/10.0
PopMatters	4/10

All Harm Ends Here is the fourth full-length recording by American indie rock band Early Day Miners. It was originally released on Indiana label Secretly Canadian.

== Track listing ==
1. "Errance" – 4:30
2. "Townes" – 4:20
3. "The Union Trade" – 6:05
4. "Comfort/Guilt" – 3:30
5. "All Harm" – 4:08
6. "Precious Blood" – 2:33
7. "We Know in Part" – 5:41
8. "The Way We Live Now" – 3:48
9. "The Purest Red" – 5:18

== Personnel ==
- Dan Burton: vocals, guitar
- Joseph Brumley: guitar
- Kirk Pratt: guitar
- Matt Griffin: drums
- Jonathan Richardson: bass
