= Bawa Muhaiyaddeen =

Sri Lankan Sufi mystic and spiritual leader (d. 1986)

Muhammad Raheem Bawa Muhaiyaddeen
- Born: Unknown; Sri Lanka
- Died: December 8, 1986; Philadelphia, Pennsylvania, U.S.

Philosophical work
- Era: 20th century
- Region: Sri Lanka, United States

Muhammad Raheem Bawa Muhaiyaddeen (died December 8, 1986), also known as Bawa, was a Tamil-speaking teacher and Sufi mystic from Sri Lanka who came to the United States in 1971, established a following, and founded the Bawa Muhaiyaddeen Fellowship in Philadelphia. He developed branches in the United States, Canada, Australia and the UK — adding to existing groups in Jaffna and Colombo, Sri Lanka. He is known for his teachings, discourses, songs, and artwork.

Bawa established vegetarianism as the norm for his followers and meat products are not permitted at the legacy fellowship center or farm.

== Early life ==
Though little is known of his early personal life, Bawa Muhaiyaddeen's public career began in Sri Lanka in the early 1940s, when he emerged from the jungles of Sri Lanka, near Kataragama.

Bawa met pilgrims who were visiting shrines and gradually became more widely known. There were reports of dream or mystical meetings with Bawa that preceded physical contact. According to an account from the 1940s, Bawa had spent time in Kataragama, a jungle shrine in the south of the island, and in 'Jailani', a cliff shrine dedicated to 'Abd al-Qadir al-Jilani of Baghdad, an association that links him to the Qadiri order of Sufism. Many of his followers who lived around the northern town of Jaffna were Hindus and addressed him as swami or guru, where he was a medical and spiritual faith healer — and is alleged to have cured demonic possession.

Subsequently, his followers formed an ashram in Jaffna, and a farm south of the city. After meeting business travelers from the south, he was invited to visit Colombo, the capital of Sri Lanka, at the time Ceylon. By 1967, the 'Serendib Sufi Study Circle' was formed by these Colombo predominantly Muslim students. Earlier in 1955, Bawa had set the foundations for a 'God's house' or mosque in the town of Mankumban, on the northern coast. This was the result of a "spiritual experience with Mary, Jesus' mother." After two decades, the building was finished by students from the United States who were visiting the Jaffna ashram. It officially opened and was dedicated in 1975.

Bawa taught using stories and fables, reflecting the background of the student or listener and included Hindu, Buddhist, Jewish, Christian, and Muslim religious traditions; and welcomed persons from all traditions and backgrounds.

== Work in the United States ==
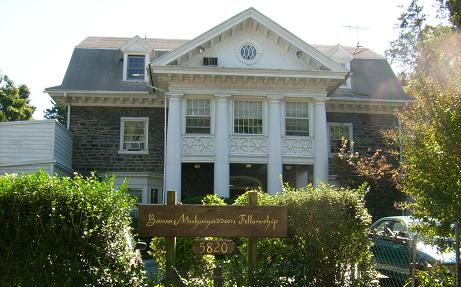
Bawa Muhaiyaddeen Fellowship

In 1971, Bawa was invited to come to the United States and subsequently moved to Philadelphia, established a following, and formed the Bawa Muhaiyaddeen Fellowship in 1973. The fellowship meeting house offered weekly public gatherings.

As in Sri Lanka, Bawa developed a following among people of diverse religious, social and ethnic backgrounds, who came to Philadelphia to listen to him speak. In the United States, Canada and England, he was recognized by religious scholars, journalists, educators and leaders. The United Nations' Assistant Secretary General, Robert Muller, asked for Bawa's guidance on behalf of mankind during an interview in 1974. During the Iranian hostage crisis of 1978–1980, he wrote letters to world leaders including Iran's Khomeini, Prime Minister Begin, President Sadat and President Carter to encourage a peaceful resolution to the conflict. Time magazine, during the crisis in 1980, quoted Bawa as saying that when the Iranians understand the Koran "they will release the hostages immediately." Interviews with Bawa appeared in Psychology Today, the Harvard Divinity Bulletin, and in The Philadelphia Inquirer and the Pittsburgh Press. He continued teaching until his death on December 8, 1986.

== Legacy ==
In May, 1984, the Mosque of Shaikh M. R. Bawa Muhaiyaddeen was completed on the Philadelphia property of the Bawa Muhaiyaddeen Fellowship, on Overbrook Avenue. Construction took 6 months and nearly all the work was done by the members of the fellowship under Bawa's direction.

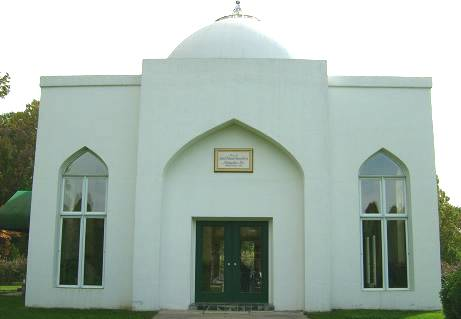
Mazar of M.R. Bawa Muhaiyaddeen

The Bawa Muhaiyaddeen Fellowship Farm (100 acres (0.40 km^{2})) is in Chester County, Pennsylvania, south of Coatesville and prominently features Bawa's mausoleum, or mazar. Construction began shortly after his death and was completed in 1987. It is a destination for religious followers.

Bawa created paintings and drawings symbolizing the relationship between man and God, describing his art work as "heart's work". Two examples are reproduced in his book Wisdom of Man and another is the front cover of the book Four Steps to Pure Iman. In 1976, Bawa recorded and released an album of meditation, on Folkways Records entitled, Into the Secret of the Heart by Guru Bawa Muhaiyaddeen.

In the United States, from 1971 to 1986, Bawa authored over twenty-five books, created from over 10,000 hours of audio and video transcriptions of his discourses and songs. Some titles originated from Sri Lanka before his arrival in the U.S. and were transcribed later. The Bawa Muhaiyaddeen Fellowship continues to study and disseminate this repository of his teachings. It has not appointed a new leader or Sheikh to replace his role as teacher and personal guide.

== Vegetarianism ==
Bawa established vegetarianism as the norm for his followers as he believed the only compassionate choice is to eat without slaughter. He stated that "we must be aware of everything we do. All young animals have love and compassion. And if we remember that every creation was young once, we will never kill another life. We will not harm or attack any living creature". Bawa authored The Tasty Economical Cookbook, a two-volume vegetarian cookbook.

== Titles and honorifics ==
Bawa Muhaiyaddeen was referred to as Guru, Swami, Sheikh or 'His Holiness' depending on the background of the speaker or writer. He was also addressed as Bawangal by those Tamil speakers who were close to him and who wanted to use a respectful address. He often referred to himself as an 'ant man', that is, a very small life in God's creation. After his arrival in the United States, he was most often addressed as Guru Bawa or simply Bawa, and he established the fellowship. By 1976, he felt that the title 'guru' had been abused by others who were not true teachers and dropped the title Guru, with the organization becoming the Bawa Muhaiyaddeen Fellowship.

By 2007, an honorific, Qutb, was used by his students in the publications of his talks. Qutb means pole or axis, and signifies a spiritual center. The name Muhaiyaddeen means 'the giver of life to true belief' and has been associated with previous Qutbs.

== Quotes ==
- "The prayers you perform, the duties you do, the charity and love you give is equal to just one drop. But if you use that one drop, continue to do your duty, and keep digging within, then the spring of God's grace and His qualities will flow in abundance."
- "People with wisdom know that it is important to correct their own mistakes, while people without wisdom find it necessary to point out the mistakes of others. People with strong faith know that it is important to clear their own hearts, while those with unsteady faith seek to find fault in the hearts and prayers of others. This becomes a habit in their lives. But those who pray to God with faith, determination, and certitude know that the most important thing in life is to surrender their hearts to God."
- "The things that change are not our real life. Within us there is another body, another beauty. It belongs to that ray of light which never changes. We must discover how to mingle with it and become one with that unchanging thing. We must realize and understand this treasure of truth. That is why we have come to the world."
- "My love you, my children. Very few people will accept the medicine of wisdom. The mind refuses wisdom. But if you do agree to accept it, you will receive the grace, and when you receive that grace, you will have good qualities. When you acquire good qualities, you will know true love, and when you accept love, you will see the light. When you accept the light, you will see the resplendence, and when you accept that resplendence, the wealth of the three worlds will be complete within you. With this completeness, you will receive the kingdom of God, and you will know your Father. When you see your Father, all your connections to karma, hunger, disease, old age will leave you."
- "My grandchildren, this is the way things really are. We must do everything with love in our hearts. God belongs to everyone. He has given a commonwealth to all His creations, and we must not take it for ourselves. We must not take more than our share. Our hearts must melt with love, we must share everything with others, and we must give lovingly to make others peaceful. Then we will win our true beauty and the liberation of our soul. Please think about this. Prayer, the qualities of God, the actions of God, faith in God, and worship of God are your grace. If you have these, God will be yours and the wealth of the world to come will be yours. My grandchildren, realize this in your lifetime. Consider your life, search for wisdom, search for knowledge, and search for that love of God which is divine knowledge, and search for His qualities, His love, and His actions. That will be good. Amin. Ya Rabbal-'alamin. So be it. O Ruler of the universes. May God grant you this."
- "God has a home inside of our heart. We must find a home inside of God's home inside of our heart" - Shared by Bawa Mahaiyaddeen in conversation with advocate for the homeless at the Muhaiyaddeen community in Philadelphia - 1986.

== Writings by students and others ==
Books by his followers and others about M.R. Bawa Muhaiyaddeen include:

- The Answer Lies Just Beyond the Mind - The Soul's Longing to Know Itself by Dale Ann Applebaum, Anndale Books publisher, 2024, ISBN 979-8218405434
- Birding Through Cancer by Karin Marcus, Balboa Press publisher, 2016, ISBN 1504356543
- The Crucifixion of Judas: And other reflections on the journey from the mind to the soul by Tony Buck, Planet Publishing publisher, 2022, ISBN 0964680211
- The Culture of Goodness: My Exploration of Judaism, Christianity, and Islam in search of a Culture of Goodness by Sandra T Francis, Outskirts Press publisher, 2019, ISBN 978-1977206145
- The Elixir of Truth: Inner Dimensions, Volume Two by Musa Muhaiyaddeen, Witness Within publisher, 2014, ISBN 0989018555
- The Elixir of Truth: Journey on the Sufi Path, Volume One by Musa Muhaiyaddeen, Witness Within publisher, 2013, ISBN 0989018504
- Finding the Way Home by Dr. Lockwood Rush, Ilm House publisher, 2007, ISBN 0972660712
- GPS for the Soul: Wisdom of the Master by Dana Hayne, BalboaPress publisher, 2017, ISBN 1504384040
- The Illuminated Prayer: The Five-Times Prayer of the Sufis by Coleman Barks and Michael Green, Ballantine Wellspring publisher, 2000, ISBN 0-345-43545-1. According to the publisher, the book "offers a compelling introduction to the wisdom and teachings of the beloved contemporary Sufi master Bawa Muhaiyaddeen, who brought new life to this mystical tradition by opening a passage to its deepest, universal realities. It is the loving handiwork of two of Bawa's best-known students, Coleman Barks and Michael Green, who also created The Illuminated Rumi."
- Invitation to Believe: Establishing Faith in the Universal Power by Julie R. Schelling, Coaching for Resonance publisher, 2014, ISBN 0990592006
- A Journey Through Ten Thousand Veils: The Alchemy of Transformation on the Sufi Path by Sheikha Maryam Kabeer, Tughra Books publisher, 2021, ISBN 9781597849470
- Life with the Guru by Dr. Art Hochberg, Kalima publisher, 2014, ISBN 0988807556
- THE MIRROR Photographs and Reflections on Life with M.R. Bawa Muhaiyaddeen (Ral.) by Chloë Le Pichon and Dwaraka Ganesan and Saburah Posner and Sulaiha Schwartz, published privately by Chloë Le Pichon, 2010, ISBN 0-615-33211-0. A 237-page large-format photographic compilation with commentary by 78 contributors.
- My Journey Around the Sun by Muhammad Abdullah ibn Robert Lowe, IbnRLowe Publishing, 2023, ISBN 979-8218276553
- My Years with the Qutb: A Walk in Paradise by Professor Sharon Marcus, Sufi Press publisher, 2007, ISBN 0-9737534-0-4
- One Light: An Owner's Manual for Human Being by Mitch Gilbert, One Light Press publisher, 2005, ISBN 0-9771267-0-6
- One Song: A New Illuminated Rumi by Michael Green, Running Press publisher, 2005, ISBN 0-7624-2087-1
- One Tough Rose: On Learning from One’s Mistakes by AnnMarie Williams, Peace Rose Press publisher, 2023, ISBN 979-8218270247
- The Qutbiyaat: When Wisdom Dawns by Dennis Maq Cook, Heartswork Press publisher, 2006, ISBN 0-9778410-5-7

Coleman Barks, a poet and translator into English of the works of the 13th-century Sunni Muslim poet Jalāl ad-Dīn Muḥammad Rūmī, described meeting Bawa Muhaiyaddeen in a dream in 1977. After that experience he began to translate the poems of Rumi. Coleman finally met Bawa Muhaiyaddeen in September, 1978 and continued to have dreams where he would receive teachings. Coleman's likens Bawa Muhaiyaddeen to Rumi and Shams Tabrizi, the companion of Rumi. Artist Michael Green worked with Coleman Barks to produce illustrated version of Rumi's works.

In "Blue-Eyed Devil", Michael Muhammad Knight attempts to receive a message from Bawa in a dream, in a Sufi practice called istikhara. He travels to the mazar and unsuccessfully tries to fall asleep on the cushions, but is awakened by the groundskeeper.

The band mewithoutYou explored Bawa's teachings throughout their discography, most notably in their fourth album, It's All Crazy! It's All False! It's All a Dream! It's Alright. The teacher's story of "The Fox, the Crow, and the Cookie" from My Love You My Children: 101 Stories for Children is told as well as his story about the "King Beetle" from The Divine Luminous Wisdom that Dispels Darkness.

== See also ==
- Sufi
- List of Sufis
- New religious movement
