= The Treatment (Early Day Miners album) =

Studio album by Early Day Miners
- Released: September 8, 2009
- Recorded: March 2006 – February 2008
- Studio: At home in New Orleans, Louisiana, Grotto Home Studio in Bloomington, Indiana and Echo Park Studios in Bloomington, Indiana
- Genre: Ambient, alternative rock, slowcore, post-rock, shoegaze
- Length: 42:46
- Label: Secretly Canadian
- Producer: Paul Mahern

Early Day Miners chronology
Offshore (2006)	The Treatment (2009)	Night People (2011)

Professional ratings
Review scores
Source	Rating
Pitchfork Media	5.6/10
Unbored	9/10

The Treatment is the sixth full-length album by Early Day Miners, released on September 8, 2009 on Secretly Canadian Records.

== Track listing ==
1. "In the Fire" – 4:23
2. "So Slowly" – 6:56
3. "The Surface of Things" – 6:20
4. "Spaces" – 4:23
5. "How to Fall" – 5:21
6. "The Zip" – 5:10
7. "Becloud" – 8:11
8. "Silver Oath" – 1:59

== Personnel ==
- Dan Burton: vocals, guitar
- John Dawson: guitar
- Marty Sprowles: drums
- Jonathan Richardson: bass
