= Stateless (Unwed Sailor and Early Day Miners album) =

Studio album by Unwed Sailor and Early Day Miners
- Released: January 22, 2002
- Genre: Ambient, instrumental rock
- Length: 30:40
- Label: The Great Vitamin Mystery

Professional ratings
Review scores
Source	Rating
Allmusic	2.5/5 stars
Pitchfork Media	7.2/10

Stateless is a 2002 album on which the bands Unwed Sailor and Early Day Miners collaborated to create a soundtrack for filmmaker Chris Bennett's film of the same name. The film is included on the Enhanced CD with the entire album playing seamlessly as its soundtrack. The film features around 30 minutes of footage that Bennett shot on Super 8 film during his various travels. The release was mastered by Carl Saff.

== Track listing ==
1. "The Ninth Ward" – 8:00
2. "Scandinavian Comfort" – 7:36
3. "Treeline" – 4:17
4. "Mosaic" – 2:55
5. "Chandelier" – 7:52
