= The Trouble with Sweeney =

American band

The Trouble with Sweeney was a band from Philadelphia, Pennsylvania that existed from 1999 to 2004.

The band's songwriter and frontman Joey Sweeney started the band five years after leaving The Barnabys and recording a solo album, Heartache Baseball. They released two full-length albums and two EPs on Burnt Toast Vinyl, as well as a self-titled EP which was released shortly after their formation. They also released an EP on the Basement Life imprint called Play Karen (and Others) in 2002. Many of the band's songs depict life in the city of Philadelphia and the surrounding area, and their final EP, Fishtown Briefcase, is named after a Philadelphia neighborhood. "The Counterfeiters" from I Know You Destroy! and "Waiting for Gary" from Play Karen (and Others) directly refer to or quote the writings of André Gide, a French author.

Joey Sweeney wrote for alternative weekly newspaper Philadelphia Weekly in the 1990s is now the editor of the website Philebrity. Producer Brian McTear has gone on to mix, engineer, and produce albums for a number of notable artists, such as Marissa Nadler, Espers, Sharon Van Etten, Jens Lekman, Meg Baird, Danielson Famile, Mazarin, and Greg Weeks.

== Discography ==
=== Full lengths ===
- Dear Life (Burnt Toast Vinyl, 2001)
- I Know You Destroy! (Burnt Toast, 2003)

=== EPs ===
- The Trouble With Sweeney (Burnt Toast, 1999)
- Play Karen (and Others) (Basement Life Recordings, 2002)
- Fishtown Briefcase (Burnt Toast, 2004)
