= Jefferson At Rest =

Jefferson at Rest

Studio album by Early Day Miners
- Released: April 22, 2003
- Recorded: 2003
- Studio: Grotto Home Studio in Bloomington, Indiana
- Genre: Ambient, alternative rock, slowcore, post-rock, shoegaze
- Length: 37:40
- Label: Secretly Canadian
- Producer: Early Day Miners

Early Day Miners chronology
Let Us Garlands Bring (2002)	Jefferson at Rest (2003)	Sonograph EP (2004)

Professional ratings
Review scores
Source	Rating
Allmusic	link
Pitchfork Media	4.7/10 link

Jefferson at Rest is the third full-length recording by American band Early Day Miners. Originally released on Indiana label Secretly Canadian.

== Track listing ==
1. "Wheeling" – 4:55
2. "New Holland" – 4:02
3. "Jefferson" – 5:02
4. "McCalla" – 5:09
5. "Awake" – 7:18
6. "Into Pines" – 6:08
7. "Cotillion" – 5:07

== Credits ==
- Dan Burton: vocals, guitar
- Joseph Brumley: guitar
- Rory Leitch: drums
- Matt Lindblom: bass
- Maggie Polk: violin
- Erin Houchin: vocal
