= Little War =

Little War may refer to:

== Conflicts ==
- The Little War in Hungary, a series of conflicts between the Habsburgs and the Ottoman Empire in the 16th century
- The Little War (Cuba) or Guerra Chiquita (1879–1880), the middle of three conflicts in the Cuban War of Independence
- The Slovak-Hungarian War or Little War, fought in 1939 between the First Slovak Republic and Hungary in eastern Slovakia
- The Little Civil War or Patuleia in Portugal (1846–47)
- The Little War (Fiji), an 1876 conflict between the British colonists and the native people in Fiji

== Other uses ==
- Little War Island or Malo Ratno Ostrvo, a Serbian island
- Little Wars, an early table top war game, invented by author H. G. Wells
- Little Wars (album), a 2008 album by Unwed Sailor
- Little Wars (film), a 1982 French-Lebanese war film
