= Little Wars (album) =

Studio album by Unwed Sailor
- Released: 2008
- Genre: Instrumental rock, ambient
- Label: Burnt Toast Vinyl

Unwed Sailor chronology
| The White Ox (2006) | Little Wars (2008) |

Professional ratings
Review scores
| Source | Rating |
|---|---|
| AllMusic | 3.5/5 stars |
| The Skinny | 4/5 stars |
| Tiny Mix Tapes | 2.5/5 stars |

Little Wars is an album by Unwed Sailor. It was recorded between December 27, 2002 and November 7, 2007. The album was released on April 1, 2008, by Burnt Toast Vinyl.

== Critical reception ==
PopMatters called the album "geometrically precise yet warmly organic, serenely unperturbed but with a bubbling undercurrent of mirth", writing that "this is what might happen to post-rock if you put it in a warm corner of the garden and allowed it to grow". Exclaim! called it "instrumental post-rock covered in molasses ... the pace is lethargic, barely creeping beyond a plod".

== Track listing ==
1. "Copper Islands"
2. "Little Wars"
3. "The Garden"
4. "Aurora"
5. "Campanile"
6. "Echo Roads"
7. "Nauvoo"
8. "Lonely Bulls"
9. "Numeral"

== Personnel ==
- Stalactite Oracle Studio Session (December 27–28, 2002)
  - Jonathan Ford
  - Matthew Putman
  - Matthew Depper
  - Brooks Tipton
  - Nic Tse
  - Jeff Shoop
  - James McAllister
- Ester Drang Studio Session (mid-2004)
  - Jonathan Ford
  - Aaron Ford
  - Brooks Tipton
  - Stephen Tucker
  - Bryce Chambers
  - James McAllister
  - Matthew Magee
- Little Wars Blackwatch Studio Sessions 1 and 2 (October 12–19, 2007 and November 5–7, 2007)
  - Jonathan Ford
  - Nic Tse
  - Matthew Putman
  - Brooks Tipton
  - Matthew Depper
  - Patrick Ryan
  - Andrew Haldeman
  - Ryan Lindsey
  - Chad Copelin
