= Placer Found =

Studio album by Early Day Miners
- Released: April 2, 2001
- Recorded: 2000
- Genres: Ambient, alternative rock, slowcore, post-rock, shoegaze
- Length: 49:22
- Label: Western Vinyl
- Producer: Early Day Miners

Early Day Miners chronology
Placer Found (2001)	Let Us Garlands Bring (2002)

Professional ratings
Review scores
Source	Rating
AllMusic	3/5 stars
The Encyclopedia of Popular Music	3/5 stars
Ox-Fanzine	4.5/5 stars
PopMatters	7/10 stars

Placer Found is the first full-length recording by the American band Early Day Miners, released on Western Vinyl in 2000. It was reissued by Secretly Canadian in 2020.

== Critical reception ==
AllMusic called Placer Found "a fragile album of moody textures and minimalist, slow rock sound explorations." Exclaim! wrote: "Like a two-headed beast that could be called Calexi-Low, these Miners are more interested in open spaces than the depths; no one could mistake this for music made by a big city band." The Indianapolis Star deemed the album "a liquid dream of a record," writing that "the playing, never agitated or grandiose, challenges many definitions of rock guitar."

Paste described the album as "glassy guitar tones, sedate tempos and a mood that took the slowcore template of Codeine and Low and adapted it for the emo generation." Reviewing the reissue, Spin called the album "an essential catalyst for the new directions that Midwestern indie rock would take in the 21st century."

== Track listing ==
1. "Placer Found" – 2:54
2. "East Berlin at Night" – 6:47
3. "Texas Cinema" – 5:11
4. "In These Hills" – 8:55
5. "Stanwix" – 7:32
6. "Longwall" – 5:48
7. "Desert Cantos" – 12:15

== Personnel ==
- Dan Burton: vocals, guitar
- Joseph Brumley: guitar
- Rory Leitch: drums
- Kenny Chiders: bass
- Pete Skafish: bass
