= Pale Horses (album) =

Studio album by MewithoutYou
- Released: June 16, 2015
- Genre: Indie rock, post-hardcore, art rock
- Length: 39:23
- Label: Run for Cover, Big Scary Monsters, Cooking Vinyl
- Producer: Will Yip

MewithoutYou chronology
Ten Stories (2012)	Pale Horses (2015)	[Untitled] (2018)

Pale Horses is the sixth studio album by American indie rock band mewithoutYou. The record was produced by Will Yip.

On June 10, 2015, the record became available for streaming on Vice's Noisey website.

The artwork was painted in 1987 by Vasily Kafanov, who also painted the artwork for the band's previous five albums.

Professional ratings
Aggregate scores
Source	Rating
Metacritic	80/100
Review scores
Source	Rating
Alternative Press	4/5 stars
Pitchfork	7.2/10
Sputnikmusic	4.0/5
Under the Gun Review	9.5/10
Consequence of Sound	C+

== Track listing ==
Music by mewithoutYou, lyrics by Aaron Weiss.

No.	Title	Length
1.	"Pale Horse"	2:26
2.	"Watermelon Ascot"	3:09
3.	"D-Minor"	3:20
4.	"Mexican War Streets"	3:35
5.	"Red Cow"	4:03
6.	"Dorothy"	1:40
7.	"Blue Hen"	3:05
8.	"Lilac Queen"	3:58
9.	"Magic Lantern Days"	3:52
10.	"Birnam Wood"	4:18
11.	"Rainbow Signs"	6:04

UK/EU bonus track
No.	Title	Length
12.	"Chapelcross Towns"	2:58

Pale Horses: Appendix
No.	Title	Length
12.	"Hebrew Children"	1:59
13.	"Werewolf King (Demo)"	3:19
14.	"Chapelcross Towns"	2:58
15.	"Chernobyl, 1985"	4:21
16.	"Mexican War Streets (Revisited)"	3:34
17.	"Blue Hen (Geology Version)"	3:12
18.	"Fairfield"	2:15
19.	"Red Cow (Golden Calf Version)"	3:28

== Weekly charts ==
Chart (2015)	Peak position
US Billboard 200	62
US Billboard Alternative	10
