= Ester Drang =

American post rock band

- Origin: Broken Arrow, Oklahoma, U.S.
- Genres: Post-rock; indie rock; space rock; dream pop; chamber pop
- Years active: 1995–present
- Labels: Burnt Toast; Jade Tree
- Members: Bryce Chambers; Hank Hanewinkel III; Jon Paul Pope; Tommy KcKenzie
- Past members: James McAlister; Kyle Winner; Sterling Williams; Brian Brewer; David Motter; Jeff Shoop; Phillip Phillips; Deric Williams

Ester Drang is an experimental, post rock musical group from Broken Arrow, Oklahoma. The band was formed in 1995, with guitarist Bryce Chambers recruiting drummer James McAlister and bass player Kyle Winner.

The line-up of the band during its early days also included drummer Sterling Williams, sitar player Brian Brewer and songwriter David Motter. Williams, Brewer, and Motter departed shortly after the band released its first full-length LP, entitled Goldenwest. Afterwards, Jeff Shoop joined the band on guitar while Kyle left and they performed bassless moving to Jade Tree Records. Ester Drang reformed in 2012 and played the Free Tulsa summer festival. Included Kyle back on bass, Jon Paul Pope on cello, Hank Hanewinkel III (The Nuns, Unwed Sailor), and Tommy McKenzie. In 2016 and 2017 they played the Norman Music Festival in Norman, Oklahoma.

On July 17, 2017 it was announced Ester Drang is recording a new 4 song EP and released the song "The Union." Summer of 2017 they are on tour with Echo & the Bunnymen.

In 2002 members including Bryce Chambers, Kyle Winner, James McAlister, Sterling Williams, and David Motter along with Johnathon Ford (Unwed Sailor), David Bazan, Beau Jennings and Tim Miser recorded an EP called Circle of Birds released on Burnt Toast Vinyl. In 2003 members of Ester Drang played in a side project called Lasso with Beau Jennings which was released as a Tim Miser solo album. In 2008 Jeff and James played along with Ryan Lindsey Broncho for Beau Jenning's "Holy Tulsa Thunder" album.

Notable outfits the band has toured with include The American Analog Set, Starflyer 59, The Get Up Kids, Styrofoam, Unwed Sailor, David Bazan of Pedro the Lion, and Echo & the Bunnymen.

Drummer McAlister contributed to Sufjan Stevens' album Illinois.

James McAlister is now a member of Sufjan Stevens' band and has tracked drums for Rocky Votolato, The Welcome Wagon, Denison Witmer, Shannon Stephens, music with his brother-in-law Casey Foubert, Chase Pagan, Rosie Thomas, Avril Lavigne, Lorde, Umbrellas, and his electronic music under the name 900X.

Jeff Shoop married musician Rosie Thomas.

== Discography ==
- "First Longing 4 Song EP"
- That Is When He Turns Us Golden (1999)
- Goldenwest (Burnt Toast Vinyl, 2001)
- Infinite Keys (Jade Tree, 2003)
- Pleasure Themes and Get Rich Schemes (Burnt Toast Vinyl, 2004)
- Rocinate (Jade Tree, 2006)
- The Appearances EP (Clerestory AV, 2018)
