= Let Us Garlands Bring =

Studio album by Early Day Miners
- Released: May 7, 2002
- Recorded: 2002
- Genre: Ambient, alternative rock, slowcore, post-rock, shoegaze
- Length: 63:03
- Label: Secretly Canadian
- Producer: Early Day Miners

Early Day Miners chronology
Placer Found (2000)	Let Us Garlands Bring (2002)	Jefferson at Rest (2003)

Professional ratings
Review scores
Source	Rating
Allmusic	4.5/5 stars
Fake Jazz	(10/12)

Let Us Garlands Bring is the second full-length recording by American band Early Day Miners. It was originally released on Indiana label Secretly Canadian.

The album title is a quotation from Shakespeare's song "Who Is Silvia?" in his play The Two Gentlemen of Verona.

== Critical reception ==
AllMusic described Let Us Garlands Bring as "a huge technical jump in an exciting direction," noting its emotive lyrical themes and complex sonic textures. Similarly, Fake Jazz observed a progression toward a more "patient and restrained" sound, characterizing the release as quiet and contemplative.

== Track listing ==
1. "Centralia"
2. "Santa Carolina"
3. "Offshore"
4. "Silvergate"
5. "Summer Ends"
6. "Autumn Wake"
7. "Light in August"
8. "A Common Wealth"

== Personnel ==
- Dan Burton: vocals, guitar
- Joseph Brumley: guitar
- Rory Leitch: drums
- Matt Lindblom: bass
- Maggie Polk: violin
- Carl Saff: mastering
