= Untitled (mewithoutYou EP) =

[untitled]

EP by MewithoutYou
- Released: August 17, 2018
- Genre: Indie rock, art rock
- Length: 25:23
- Label: Run for Cover, Big Scary Monsters
- Producer: Will Yip

MewithoutYou chronology
Pale Horses (2015)	[untitled] (2018)	[Untitled] (2018)

[untitled] is the fourth EP by American indie rock band mewithoutYou. The record was produced by Will Yip.

On August 13, 2018, mewithoutYou released the first single off of the not-yet-announced [Untitled], "Julia (or, 'Holy to the LORD' on the Bells of Horses)." At the same time of the single's release, the band tweeted a link to a page on their website containing only a countdown timer. The timer finished at 12:00 am Eastern time (05:00 UTC) on August 17, 2018 and the band announced they would be releasing their seventh studio album, [Untitled], on October 5, 2018. In addition to the full-length album announcement, mewithoutYou digitally released a "partner" EP named [untitled].

Professional ratings
Review scores
Source	Rating
Dead Press!	9/10
Jesus Freak Hideout	4/5
Punknews.org	4/5
Sputnikmusic	4.5/5

== Track listing ==
Music by mewithoutYou, lyrics by Aaron Weiss.

No.	Title	Length
1.	"Bethlehem, WV"	3:36
2.	"Winter Solstice" (alt. version)	3:24
3.	"Dirty Air"	3:21
4.	"Cities of the Plain"	5:05
5.	"Existential Dread, Six Hours' Time"	3:25
6.	"August 6th"	3:28
7.	"Kristy w/ the Sparkling Teeth"	3:04
