= Catch for Us the Foxes =

Studio album by MewithoutYou
- Released: October 5, 2004
- Recorded: Seagrass Studios, Los Angeles, California
- Genres: Christian hardcore; post-hardcore; indie rock
- Length: 45:59
- Label: Tooth & Nail
- Producer: Brad Wood

MewithoutYou chronology
[A→B] Life (2002)	Catch for Us the Foxes (2004)	Brother, Sister (2006)

Catch for Us the Foxes is the second studio album by the Philadelphia indie rock band mewithoutYou, released on October 5, 2004, by Tooth & Nail Records.

== Background ==
The album takes its name from the Biblical Song of Songs 2:15, "Catch for us the foxes, the little foxes that ruin the vineyards, our vineyards that are in bloom."

== Reception ==
Catch for Us the Foxes reached a peak position of number 20 on the Billboard Top Heatseekers on October 23, 2004.

Professional ratings
Review scores
Source	Rating
AbsolutePunk	(91%)
AllMusic	4/5 stars
Christianity Today	4.5/5 stars
Jesus Freak Hideout	3.5/5 stars

== Track listing ==
All tracks are written by mewithoutYou.

No.	Title	Length
1.	"Torches Together"	3:47
2.	"January 1979"	3:26
3.	"Tie Me Up! Untie Me!"	3:41
4.	"Leaf"	3:37
5.	"Disaster Tourism"	2:58
6.	"Seven Sisters"	3:48
7.	"The Soviet"	3:03
8.	"Paper Hanger"	4:12
9.	"My Exit, Unfair"	3:52
10.	"Four Word Letter (Pt. Two)"	4:22
11.	"Carousels"	5:41
12.	"Son of a Widow"	3:27

== Personnel ==
Personnel per booklet.

mewithoutYou

- Aaron Weiss
- Michael Weiss
- Richard Mazzotta
- Christopher Kleinberg
- Daniel Pishock

Additional musicians

- Scotty Kruger – cry of the Exodus (track 10)
- Chick Wolverton – e-bow (track 12)

Production and design

- Brad Wood – producer, engineer, mixing
- Robbie Lackritz – assistant producer, engineer, mixing
- Troy Glessner – mastering
- Chad Johnson – artists and repertoire
- Vasily Kafanov – cover painting
- Asterisk Studios – Design
