= Early Day Miners =

American rock band

- Origin: Bloomington, Indiana, United States
- Genres: Alternative rock Indie rock Sadcore; Slowcore; Shoegazing
- Years active: 1999–present
- Labels: Secretly Canadian; Acuarela Discos; Talitres; Burnt Toast Vinyl; Western Vinyl
- Members: Daniel Burton; Jonathan Richardson; Marty Sprowles; John Dawson
- Past members: Joseph Brumley; Rory Leitch; Matt Griffin; Pete Skafish; Kenny Childers; Matt Lindblom; Kate Long; Daun Fields; Donny Mahlmeister; Kirk Pratt
- Website: Official site

Early Day Miners are a band from southern Indiana, United States who released records on the Bloomington, Indiana based label, Secretly Canadian. The band has released seven full-length records.

Their first CD Placer Found was released April 2000 on Western Vinyl.

== History ==
- In 2018 Early Day Miners embarked on two North American tours.
- In 2013 Early Day Miners' (EDM) song "Milking The Moon" from Night People was featured on Showtime series Shameless. Season 3, Episode 10.
- July 2011 saw the release of their seventh full-length album entitled Night People.
- September 2009 Early Day Miners released their sixth full-length album on Secretly Canadian entitled The Treatment.
- In 2006 Early Day Miners toured with band Wilco.
- Early Day Miners have toured extensively through EU and United States.
- Early Day Miners' music was featured in the soundtrack to the NBC series Quarterlife.

== Discography ==
Albums

- 2000: Placer Found (Western Vinyl)
- 2002: Let Us Garlands Bring (Secretly Canadian)
- 2003: Jefferson At Rest (Secretly Canadian)
- 2003: Sonograph EP (Acuarela)
- 2005: All Harm Ends Here (Secretly Canadian)
- 2006: Offshore (Secretly Canadian)
- 2009: The Treatment (Secretly Canadian)
- 2011: Night People (Western Vinyl)
- 2024: Outside Lies Magic (Solid Brass Records)

Singles and split releases

- 2001: Southern Myth
- 2001: Last Snow
- 2002: Stateless
- 2003: Deep Harbor (Burnt Toast Vinyl)
- 2018: Night Suit (For Tarah Cards) / Sterling Provisions
- 2019: The Ongoing Moment EP

Compilation appearances

- SC 100
- Pulse from Mid America
- Acuarela Songs 3
- For Jonathan
- Green UFOs
- Talitres is 5
