= Ten Stories =

Studio album by MewithoutYou
- Released: May 15, 2012
- Genres: Indie rock; art rock; post-hardcore; indie folk
- Length: 40:30
- Label: Pine Street
- Producer: Daniel Smith

MewithoutYou chronology
It's All Crazy! It's All False! It's All a Dream! It's Alright (2009)	Ten Stories (2012)	Pale Horses (2015)

Ten Stories is the fifth studio album by American indie rock band mewithoutYou. The record was produced by Daniel Smith and mixed by Brad Wood. The album's track listing was published by Alternative Press's website in March 2012.

The album focuses on ten stories that make up the larger story of the whole album of a traveling circus and the train crash it suffered in late 19th-century Montana. The inspiration comes from a book read in a class that lead singer and lyricist Aaron Weiss took while attending school during the band's hiatus.

On May 8, 2012, the record became available for streaming on Spotify. The album was released May 15, 2012, with pre-orders starting April 17, 2012.

The largest pre-order bundle on their online store is $40 and includes a 2XLP on colored 150g vinyl, 4th side vinyl etching, custom inner sleeves, a 28-page lyric booklet with 11 original paintings by Vasily Kafanov, 11x17 Poster, 13-song bonus CD with alternate album cover, instant digital download on street date, exclusive b-sides 7" single Other Stories:, an 8-page lyric booklet, two more original paintings by Vasily Kafanov, and foreword by the band's drummer Rick Mazzotta.

Professional ratings
Aggregate scores
Source	Rating
Metacritic	84/100
Review scores
Source	Rating
Christianity Today	4/5 stars
MTV.com	(positive)
RELEVANT	(positive)

== Track listing ==
Music by mewithoutYou, lyrics by Aaron Weiss.

No.	Title	Length
1.	"February, 1878"	3:46
2.	"Grist for the Malady Mill"	3:17
3.	"East Enders Wives"	2:52
4.	"Cardiff Giant"	3:43
5.	"Elephant in the Dock"	3:51
6.	"Aubergine"	3:14
7.	"Fox's Dream of the Log Flume"	3:44
8.	"Nine Stories"	4:46
9.	"Fiji Mermaid"	3:34
10.	"Bear's Vision of St. Agnes"	4:59
11.	"All Circles"	2:44

Deluxe
No.	Title	Length
12.	"Julian the Onion"	4:04
13.	"Four Fires"	3:36

== Personnel ==
mewithoutYou

- Aaron Weiss – vocals, guitars
- Michael Weiss – guitars, keyboards
- Greg Jehanian – bass guitar
- Rickie Mazzotta – drums

Additional personnel

- Brandon Beaver – additional guitars (tracks 1, 4, 6, 7)
- Kris Klein – additional guitars (tracks 9, 10)
- Aimee Wilson – vocals (tracks 3, 10, 12)
- Amy Carrigan – vocals (tracks 5, 6, 13)
- Hayley Williams – vocals (tracks 7, 11)
- Daniel Smith – vocals (track 11)
- Kim Tice – accordion (tracks 8, 12)
- Maria Mirenzi – baritone saxophone (track 8)
- Jay Beck – percussion (track 13)
- Joshua Stamper – string arrangements, conducting
- Daniel Delaney, Daniel Wright, Erica Miller, Paul Arbogast – string instrumentation

Production

- Daniel Smith – production
- Brad Wood – mixing, additional production
- Hans Dekline – mastering
- David Downham – engineering
