= It's All Crazy! It's All False! It's All a Dream! It's Alright =

It's All Crazy! It’s All False! It's All a Dream! It's Alright

Studio album by MewithoutYou
- Released: May 19, 2009
- Studios: Miner Street Recordings, Philadelphia
- Genres: Indie rock; indie folk; baroque pop; art rock
- Length: 44:57
- Label: Tooth & Nail
- Producers: Daniel Smith and Brian McTear

MewithoutYou chronology
Brother, Sister (2006)	It's All Crazy! It’s All False! It's All a Dream! It's Alright (2009)	Ten Stories (2012)

Professional ratings
Review scores
Source	Rating
AbsolutePunk.net	(84%) link
AllMusic	link
Christianity Today	link
Jesus Freak Hideout	link
Rock Sound	(10/10) link
Sputnikmusic	link

It’s All Crazy! It’s All False! It’s All a Dream! It’s Alright is the fourth studio album by American indie band mewithoutYou. The record was Produced by Brian McTear and Daniel Smith, and was released on May 19, 2009 through Tooth & Nail Records. The album is much more focused on the band's melodic and folk influences, such as Neutral Milk Hotel and Bob Dylan, with most of the songs written around the acoustic guitar. Many other instruments are used throughout the album, such as bells, violins, and an accordion. The poetic themes in the album include lyrical confessions, pastoral reflections, and parables. There is also a focus on spiritual reflection, existential meaning through the love of God and others, and the teachings of Sufi mystic Bawa Muhaiyaddeen.

== Track listing ==
Music by mewithoutYou, lyrics by Aaron Weiss.

No.	Title	Length
1.	"Every Thought a Thought of You"	3:31
2.	"The Fox, the Crow and the Cookie"	3:31
3.	"The Angel of Death Came to David's Room"	3:54
4.	"Goodbye, I!"	3:50
5.	"A Stick, a Carrot & String"	3:06
6.	"Bullet to Binary (Pt. Two)"	5:12
7.	"Timothy Hay"	3:37
8.	"Fig with a Bellyache"	3:31
9.	"Cattail Down"	3:47
10.	"The King Beetle on a Coconut Estate"	6:01
11.	"Allah, Allah, Allah"	4:55

== Lyrical themes ==
It's All Crazy! It's All False! It's All a Dream! It's Alright explores many of the teachings of Bawa Muhaiyaddeen. The Sufi teacher's story of "The Fox, the Crow, and the Cookie" from My Love You My Children: 101 Stories for Children is told as well as his story about the "King Beetle" from The Divine Luminous Wisdom that Dispels Darkness. Other concepts from the teacher are explored in "Allah, Allah, Allah," about seeing God in every blade of grass and in "Fig with a Bellyache" dealing with sexual temptation from The Divine Luminous Wisdom... and The Golden Words of a Sufi Sheikh.

The album's mixture of Jewish, Christian, and Muslim themes has been the subject of much critical attention, with the band exploring Islamic concepts such as the oneness and universality of God.

== Awards ==
In 2010, the album was nominated for a Dove Award for Recorded Music Packaging of the Year at the 41st GMA Dove Awards.
