= (A→B) Life =

[A→B] Life

Studio album by MewithoutYou
- Released: June 18, 2002
- Recorded: Inner Ear, Washington, D.C.
- Genres: Post-hardcore, alternative rock, experimental rock
- Length: 47:32
- Label: Tooth & Nail
- Producer: J. Robbins

MewithoutYou chronology
I Never Said That I Was Brave (2002)	[A→B] Life (2002)	Catch for Us the Foxes (2004)

Professional ratings
Review scores
Source	Rating
AllMusic	4/5 stars

[A→B] Life is the debut album by American rock band mewithoutYou. It was released on Tooth & Nail Records on June 18, 2002. The songs "Bullet to Binary" and "Gentlemen" were featured on a split album with Norma Jean.

== Track listing ==
All tracks are written by MewithoutYou.

No.	Title	Length
1.	"Bullet to Binary"	2:47
2.	"The Ghost"	3:13
3.	"Nice and Blue"	3:54
4.	"Everything Was Beautiful and Nothing Hurt"	4:44
5.	"(A)"	0:54
6.	"Gentlemen"	2:49
7.	"Be Still, Child"	2:41
8.	"We Know Who Our Enemies Are"	2:58
9.	"I Never Said That I Was Brave"	3:01
10.	"(B)"	1:34
11.	"Silencer"	3:49
12.	"The Cure for Pain"	15:08

"The Cure for Pain" contains an acoustic rendition of "I Never Said That I Was Brave" as a hidden track. The vocal in this song is performed by bassist Daniel Pishock.

== Personnel ==
mewithoutYou

- Aaron Weiss – vocals, art direction
- Michael Weiss – guitar
- Christopher Kleinberg – guitar
- Daniel Pishock – bass
- Richard Mazzotta – drums

Additional

- J. Robbins – producer, audio engineer, mixing, percussion
- Alan Douches – mastering
- Asterik Studio – design, layout
