= Burnt Toast Vinyl =

American independent record label

- Founded: 1996
- Founder: Scott Hatch
- Genre: Various
- Country of origin: United States
- Location: Philadelphia, Pennsylvania, U.S.

Burnt Toast Vinyl is an independent record label based in Philadelphia, Pennsylvania.

== History ==
Burnt Toast Vinyl was founded by Scott Hatch, a Drexel University student who had initially been involved with concert promotion at the school. The label has released full albums from several prominent Philadelphia indie musicians, as well as releasing or re-releasing material on vinyl from artists, including those on the Tooth & Nail roster. Among its reissues are the debut album from Scaterd Few, re-released by Burnt Toast in 2015.

Several of Burnt Toast's post rock and experimental groups attracted notice from magazines such as Dusted and Prefix. Among the label's best-known releases are those by Denison Witmer, Unwed Sailor, and Saxon Shore.

== Roster ==
- All American Radio
- Aspera
- The Blamed
- Bosque Brown
- Circle of Birds
- Early Day Miners
- Efterklang
- Emperor X
- Ester Drang
- Explosions in the Sky
- Farquar Muckenfuss
- Foxhole
- The Huntingtons
- In a Lonely Place
- Isolation Years
- Jetenderpaul
- June Panic
- Damien Jurado
- The Magic Lantern
- mewithoutYou
- Mount Eerie
- Movies With Heroes
- Octane Blue
- The Operation (formerly Sans Culottes)
- Don Peris (of The Innocence Mission)
- Psalters
- Questions in Dialect
- Ran Away to Sea
- Reels of White Softly Flow
- Saxon Shore
- Scaterd Few
- Scientific
- The Six Parts Seven
- Somerset
- Soporus
- Starflyer 59
- Sufjan Stevens
- The Trouble with Sweeney
- Unwed Sailor
- Denison Witmer
- Woven Hand
- Yndi Halda
- Yume Bitsu

== Publications ==
- The White Ox (2006), written by Unwed Sailor, illustrated by James Marsh

== See also ==
- List of record labels
