= Timbre Cierpke =

American musician

Timbre
- Born: Timbre Heidi Cierpke; Louisville, Kentucky
- Occupations: Musician; composer; harpist
- Musical career
- Origin: Nashville, Tennessee, U.S.
- Genres: Baroque pop; chamber folk; neoclassical
- Instruments: Vocals; harp; piano; accordion; mallet; recorder
- Years active: 2008–present
- Website: timbre.bandcamp.com

Timbre Cierpke, better known as Timbre, is an American musician, composer, harpist, singer and songwriter based in Nashville, Tennessee. Timbre fronts her eponymous neoclassical / baroque pop band "Timbre", which has toured throughout Europe and the US. After receiving her Bachelor's of Music in Harp Performance from Trevecca University., Timbre's double album Sun & Moon was chosen by UNESCO's Crossings Institute as one of the most important albums of the 2010s. Timbre went on to record with Jack White on his album Lazaretto. In 2017, she announced on Twitter that she was on tour as part of Karen Elson's band opening for Ryan Adams. Timbre is also a founder and the music director for SONUS choir and plays harp for the Jackson Symphony Orchestra

== Early life ==
Timbre Cierpke was born in Louisville, Kentucky. She is the daughter of a music professor and a choral director. Timbre learned to read musical notation before she learned to read letters. In an interview with the Greensboro News & Record, she said, "I remember being in church and looking at a hymnal and being able to sing the melody and making up words to go along." She played harp professionally by the age of twelve. She has said that she "grew up in the Republican suburbs of Nashville" and that she was a pacifist and an activist before she encountered anyone who thought like her.

== Career ==
=== Early work ===
Timbre began writing and composing songs in college, "blurring the lines between classical and songwriting". She was invited to sing in Eric Whitacre's vocal ensemble for his debut at Carnegie Hall in 2010. In 2011, the production of Timbre's Christmas album was fully funded on Kickstarter. The album was released for free with a stated goal being that the music would be "able to be enjoyed by anyone no matter their economic status". In 2012, she played harp as well as consulted in choral arrangement and conducting for Brooke Waggoner's album, Originator. She was invited to perform at Audiotree Live in Chicago in May 2013. In June 2013, the production of her double disc album Sun & Moon was fully funded through a crowd-funding campaign on Indiegogo.

=== Other work ===
On May 8, 2017, Timbre was invited to perform on-stage at TEDx Talks in Nashville, Tennessee.

When asked about her collaborative work during an interview for the Greensboro News & Record, Timbre has said: “I get really excited [by my work with bands] because I get challenged [...] I’m writing songs I normally wouldn't write, especially with bands like The Chariot, which is super hard-core. And I love it. I love having a song and trying to get inside of it, trying to give more life to it."

==== Sun and Moon Double Album (2014–2015) ====
HM Magazine named Sun & Moon one of Eight Overlooked Albums for 2015. "Saying harpist Timbre Cierpke is underrated is a massive understatement. If you hear a harp in heavy music, it's probably from her. [...] There is no doubt that Cierpke has the ability to write a mainstream chamber folk album that would rival the brilliance of Joanna Newsom, but instead of choosing to please a wide audience, she creates the music she wants make". The song "Day Boy: Photogen Sees the Moon" on the Moon side, and its counterpart on Sun, "Night Girl: Nycteris Sees the Sun" are both based on an 1882 fairy tale by George MacDonald, "The Love Story of Photogen and Nycteris". Regarding aspects of composition in the double-disc album itself, Timbre has said: "I wanted these songs to reflect each other, as the sunset and sunrise do in nature, so I connected them with a melody palindrome. 'Sunrise' ends with a soaring cello and violin melody. At the opening of 'Sunset' I wrote a soprano solo with the same melody, but sung backwards, note for note."

=== Film & Video-games ===
In 2020, Timbre's vocals appeared in the popular video-game Spiritfarer on the track What Will You Leave Behind composed by Max LL.

In 2014, Timbre's work was licensed for use in David Kassan's instructive art documentary, Painting a Life. Her compositional works have since been used for the film The Heart Of Man by director Eric Esau.

==== Guest appearances ====
- The Rocketboys – Wellwisher
- A Hill to Die Upon (song "O Death", from the Holy Despair album), 2014

== Critical reception ==
PopMatters reviewed Timbre's Sun & Moon album as an "alt-classical, art concept album that is near impossible to categorize" and said that Timbre's vocals were "embedded in melodies and arrangements that suggest the mystery and beauty of a band such as Sigur Rós". In the same article, reviewer Mark Allberg called the work "exquisite, well worth listening to". Sputnik Music referred to the album as "like being in Rivendell, the White Lodge and freakin' Narnia all at the same time".

== Musical style and influences ==
In an interview with the Charleston City Paper, Timbre spoke of her views on live and classical music: “I’ve always felt like there’s a deep, intrinsic connection between two musical worlds. Playing with bands is energetic and passionate [whereas] classical music has depth, like a broad palette of color." She has cited classical composers as influences, as well as bands like Radiohead and Sigur Rós.

== Personal life ==
Timbre's parents named their four children after musical terms. She has three siblings: Tenor, Treble, and Tetra. Timbre resides in Nashville and occasionally gives private piano, harp, and voice lessons. In the past she has been contracted to as many as four professional symphonies at a time.

== Discography ==
Year	Album details
2008	Winter Comes to Wake You
2010	Little Flowers
2011	Silent Night
2015	Sun & Moon – Double Album

== Live band ==
- Chris Leidhecker – drums
- Laura Epling – violin

Past members

- Mason Self – drums, glockenspiel, toy piano
- Patrick Rush – cello
- Camille Faulkner – violin

== Collaborations ==
- Jack White, Lazaretto
- Lauren Daigle
- Rachel Grimes
- Kaleo
- Coin
- One Republic
- Devon Gilfillian
- Pvris
- Cale Tyson
- MewithoutYou
- Long Live (The Chariot album)
- The Rocketboys
- Floating World
- The Whistles & The Bells
- Brooke Waggoner
- Ricky Skaggs
- Tom Jones
- O’Brother
- Anathallo
- Cool Hand Luke
- Seryn
- Caleb Groh
- Dhruv
- Amanda Shires
