= Untitled (mewithoutYou album) =

2018 indie rock album by MewithoutYou

[Untitled]

Studio album by MewithoutYou
- Released: October 5, 2018
- Genre: Indie rock, post-hardcore, art rock
- Length: 43:12
- Label: Run for Cover, Big Scary Monsters
- Producer: Will Yip

MewithoutYou chronology
[untitled] (2018)	[Untitled] (2018)

[Untitled] is the seventh and final studio album by American indie rock band mewithoutYou.

On August 13, 2018, mewithoutYou released the first single off of the not-yet-announced [Untitled], "Julia (or, 'Holy to the LORD' on the Bells of Horses)". At the same time of the single's release, the band tweeted a link to a page on their website containing only a countdown timer. The timer finished at 12:00 am Eastern time (05:00 UTC) on August 17, 2018, and the band announced they would be releasing their seventh studio album, [Untitled], on October 5, 2018. In addition to the full-length album announcement, mewithoutYou digitally released a "partner" EP also titled [untitled].

[Untitled] was produced by Will Yip.

Professional ratings
Aggregate scores
Source	Rating
Metacritic	77/100
Review scores
Source	Rating
Pitchfork	7.5/10
Sputnikmusic	5/5
DIY	4/5 stars

== Track listing ==
Music by mewithoutYou, lyrics by Aaron Weiss.

No.	Title	Length
1.	"9:27a.m., 7/29"	2:22
2.	"Julia (or, 'Holy to the LORD' on the Bells of Horses)"	3:58
3.	"Another Head for Hydra"	2:43
4.	"[dormouse sighs]"	4:14
5.	"Winter Solstice"	3:53
6.	"Flee, Thou Matadors!"	4:58
7.	"Tortoises All the Way Down"	4:34
8.	"2,459 Miles"	2:26
9.	"Wendy & Betsy"	2:12
10.	"New Wine, New Skins"	4:44
11.	"Michael, Row Your Boat Ashore"	5:13
12.	"Break on Through (to the Other Side) [pt. Two]"	1:55
