= MewithoutYou =

American rock band

mewithoutYou
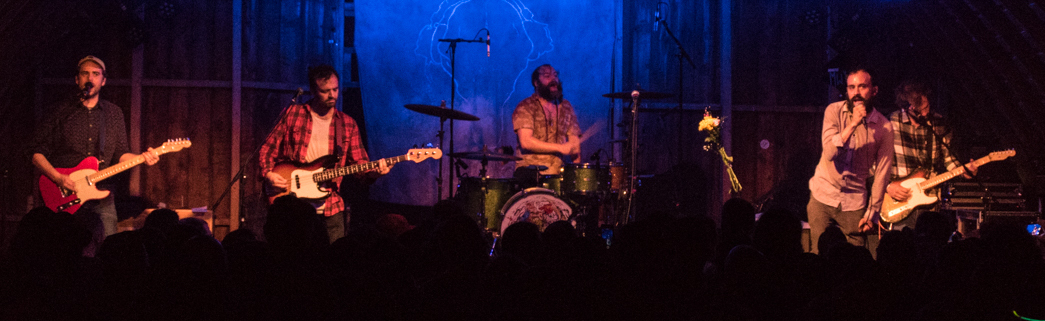
- mewithoutYou performing in 2019

Background information
- Origin: Philadelphia, Pennsylvania, U.S.
- Genres: Indie rock; post-hardcore; art rock; spoken word; emo
- Works: Discography; songs
- Years active: 2001–2022
- Labels: Tooth & Nail; Pine Street; Run for Cover; Big Scary Monsters
- Spinoff of: The Operation
- Past members: Aaron Weiss; Michael Weiss; Richard Mazzotta; Greg Jehanian Jr.; Brandon Beaver; Dominic Angelella; Christopher Kleinberg; Daniel Pishock; Ray Taddeo
- Website: mewithoutyou.com

MewithoutYou, usually stylized as mewithoutYou, was an American rock band from Philadelphia, Pennsylvania. The band consisted of Aaron Weiss (vocals), Michael Weiss and Brandon Beaver (guitars), Greg Jehanian (bass guitar), and Rickie Mazzotta (drums). The band's music is generally dominated by spoken-word vocals and free-ranging drums, bass, and guitar.

== History ==
=== Early years, first albums: 2001–2008 ===
The band was originally conceived as a side project. The Weiss brothers, Aaron and Michael, together with guitarist Christopher Kleinberg, were playing together in another band, called the Operation, with bassist Greg Jehanian. Aaron wanted to start another project, to experiment with new sounds. With the help of Ricky Mazzotta, Ray Taddeo, and his brother Mike, Aaron formed what is now formally known as mewithoutYou. At first, the band was a four-piece, with Aaron on both bass and vocals. However, in only a few months, Chris Kleinberg joined to play third guitar. The band released their first EP, I Never Said That I Was Brave, in 2001 and shortly thereafter signed to Tooth & Nail Records after a show at Cornerstone Festival the same year. Around this time, Taddeo had moved on, and Daniel Pishock was recruited to be the first official bass player of the band. The Operation disbanded soon after, and mewithoutYou's debut full-length album, [A→B] Life, was released in 2002. The band garnered more attention for their second release, 2004's Catch for Us the Foxes, which was produced by Brad Wood. In December 2004, Pishock had made the decision to retire bass duties in order to pursue a career in teaching and explore other musical ventures, and former Operation frontman, Greg Jehanian, was selected to replace him. In 2005, they won mtvU's Left Field award for most original artist, for their song "January 1979". Their third album, Brother, Sister, again produced by Wood, was released on September 26, 2006. In late 2007, Kleinberg left the band to pursue a degree in medicine. Pete Syoum filled in on guitar in the fall of 2007, but later, Kleinberg returned to play with the band on their 2008 summer tour.

=== New sound, new music, and touring: 2008–2012 ===
In September 2008, the band finished recording the follow-up to Brother, Sister, titled It's All Crazy! It's All False! It's All a Dream! It's Alright. The name of the album is taken from parable 518 in the book The Golden Words of a Sufi Sheikh, by Bawa Muhaiyaddeen. The album was a departure from Weiss' trademark shouting and the band's rough grooves. The fast rants, thick with lyrical angst, were traded for simpler melodies with lyrics about anthropomorphic food and animals. Similarly, the band scaled back their edgier post-hardcore sound, at times trading riffs for chords and guitars for pianos and harp; a classical composer was called into their Fishtown, Philadelphia studio for various arrangements on several tracks. The album was produced by Dan Smith and Brian McTear, and mixed by Brad Wood.

The band toured in a 42-foot 1976 MC8 Charter bus that ran on vegetable oil.

In 2011, they added Brandon Beaver of Buried Beds to play second guitar, as stated on their blog by Rickie Mazzotta. In August 2011, Mazzotta stated in an interview that the band had parted ways with Tooth & Nail Records, due to perceived restrictions placed on them by the label. They hinted at starting their own label as they prepared to release their fifth album. Other band members, however, expressed satisfaction with and gratitude and affection toward their old label, citing different reasons for ceasing to work with them: namely, having completed their contract, the declining relevance of record labels in the current music world, and simply the excitement to try something new.

In February 2011, Alternative Press announced that the band's fifth album, due in early 2012, would be produced by Daniel Smith. Thirteen songs were recorded in the studio sessions, eleven planned for the album, and two b-sides. On May 8, 2012, the band announced on their blog that a pre-release of Ten Stories could be streamed in its entirety on Spotify.

=== Anniversaries and farewell: 2014–2022 ===
In April 2014, the band announced a Catch for Us the Foxes ten-year anniversary tour along the US west coast and southwest, followed by a second leg along the east coast. In September 2014, they announced a vinyl reissue of the album.

In March 2015, they stated that their sixth album would be released in mid-2015 on Run For Cover Records, and in April 2015, they announced that they would support their album Pale Horses with a mid-year tour and revealed that the record would be released on June 16.

On August 11, 2017, the band announced an [A→B] Life 15th-anniversary tour with Pianos Become the Teeth, Strawberry Girls, and Slow Mass and also reissued the album on vinyl and cassette.

On August 13, 2018, they touted the release of a new single, "Julia (or, 'Holy to the LORD' on the Bells of Horses)", from their seventh album. The single was published on Run for Cover Records. In an interview with Billboard, the band confirmed that Will Yip would be returning to produce the new record. The album [Untitled] was released on October 5, 2018.

In October 2019, they announced that 2020 would be their final year as an active band. Due to the COVID-19 pandemic, they extended the timeline of their farewell, stating that 2022 would be their last active year. Their final tour included guest appearances by Josh Scogin of the Chariot and '68, Scotty Krueger of the Psalters, and Hayley Williams of Paramore, who later stated that "No band ever mattered more to me than mewithoutYou". The band's last performances took place at the Fillmore, in their hometown of Philadelphia, in August 2022.

Over their 21-year career, the band performed over 1,400 shows.

=== Post-breakup ===
After mewithoutYou disbanded, Aaron Weiss began teaching anthropology at the College of Idaho, having earned a doctoral degree in 2016 from Temple University.

A trio of live albums, branded as a triptych, were announced in 2024, with tracks from the band's final tours. Vol. 1 came out in November, Vol. 2 in August 2025, and Vol. 3 in September 2026. The artwork for the albums was created by longtime collaborator Vasily Kafanov.

In 2026, Mike Weiss was announced to be part of a new group, UNLESS, alongside Daniel Davison (formerly of Norma Jean, Every Time I Die, and Underoath) and Bryan Taylor (formerly of the Chariot).

== Lyrical themes ==
The Weiss brothers are of Jewish descent and their songs use Jewish, Muslim, and Christian imagery to explore spiritual themes. The two were raised in a Sufi Muslim household; their mother had converted from the Episcopal church and their father from Judaism. Due to the Christian imagery in some of Aaron Weiss' lyrics, the band has been categorized as a Christian band, although in an interview, Aaron stated he does not think they are a Christian band. He added that their lyrics reflect a personal relationship with God and are not evangelistic. Other lyrical themes explored include suffering and self-doubt.

Many lyrics are taken from the Sufi poet Rumi, including the song "The Cure for Pain" from [A→B] Life and a line in the song "Seven Sisters" from Catch for Us the Foxes.

In the song "Everything Was Beautiful and Nothing Hurt", from their album [A→B] Life, Aaron' lyrics are based on a poem from the metaphysical poet John Donne, called "A Valediction: Forbidding Mourning". Donne wrote the poem to his wife to explain that there is no need for dreading their physical separation or distance because their spiritual love will always keep them together.

The title of the band's second album, Catch for Us the Foxes, is taken directly from Song of Songs 2:15: "Catch for us the foxes, / the little foxes / that ruin the vineyards, / our vineyards that are in bloom" (New International Version).

In a 2007 interview, Aaron Weiss stated that the title of their third album, Brother, Sister, comes from a verse in the Bhagavad Gita.

The band's fourth album, It's All Crazy! It's All False! It's All a Dream! It's Alright, explores many of the teachings of Bawa Muhaiyaddeen. The Sufi teacher's story of "The Fox, the Crow, and the Cookie" from My Love You My Children: 101 Stories for Children is told, as well as his story about the "King Beetle" from The Divine Luminous Wisdom that Dispels Darkness. Other concepts from the teacher are explored in "Allah, Allah, Allah", about seeing God in every blade of grass and in "Fig with a Bellyache", dealing with sexual temptation from The Divine Luminous Wisdom and The Golden Words of a Sufi Sheikh. Guitarist Mike Weiss has been quoted as saying that the themes of the album reflect a time in Aaron's life where he is "sort of revisiting [religion] and holding himself up to those teachings that there's no one religion that's going to be the only way to God [...]". He adds, "If you really want to just try to follow a path to God, I don't believe you need anything beyond [Jesus Christ], but it's just the idea that you're fixed on the only way and that everybody else is just completely misguided [...] that is a sort of obtuse attitude that can hurt your own spirit".

== Legacy ==
MewithoutYou have been cited as an influence by Paramore, Casey, Being as an Ocean, Touché Amoré, and La Dispute, among others.

== Band members ==
Final lineup

- Aaron Weiss – lead vocals, accordion (2001–2022), guitar (2006–2022), bass (2001)
- Michael Weiss – guitar, keyboards, backing vocals (2001–2022)
- Rickie Mazzotta – drums (2001–2022)
- Greg Jehanian – bass, backing vocals (2004–2016, 2018–2022)
- Brandon Beaver – guitar, backing vocals (2012–2022)

Previous members

- Dominic Angelella – bass, backing vocals (2016–2018)
- Christopher Kleinberg – guitar (2001–2006)
- Daniel Pishock – bass, backing vocals, keyboards (2001–2004)
- Ray Taddeo – guitar (2001)

Touring musicians

- Brandon Beaver – (2010–2012)
- Kris Klein – guitar (2011)
- Christopher Kleinberg – guitar (2008–2010)
- Pete Syoum – guitar (2007)
- Stephen Smoker – bass (2001)

== Discography ==
- [A→B] Life (2002)
- Catch for Us the Foxes (2004)
- Brother, Sister (2006)
- It's All Crazy! It's All False! It's All a Dream! It's Alright (2009)
- Ten Stories (2012)
- Pale Horses (2015)
- [Untitled] (2018)

== See also ==
- List of songs recorded by mewithoutYou
