= Vasily Kafanov =

Russian-born painter and illustrator (born 1952)

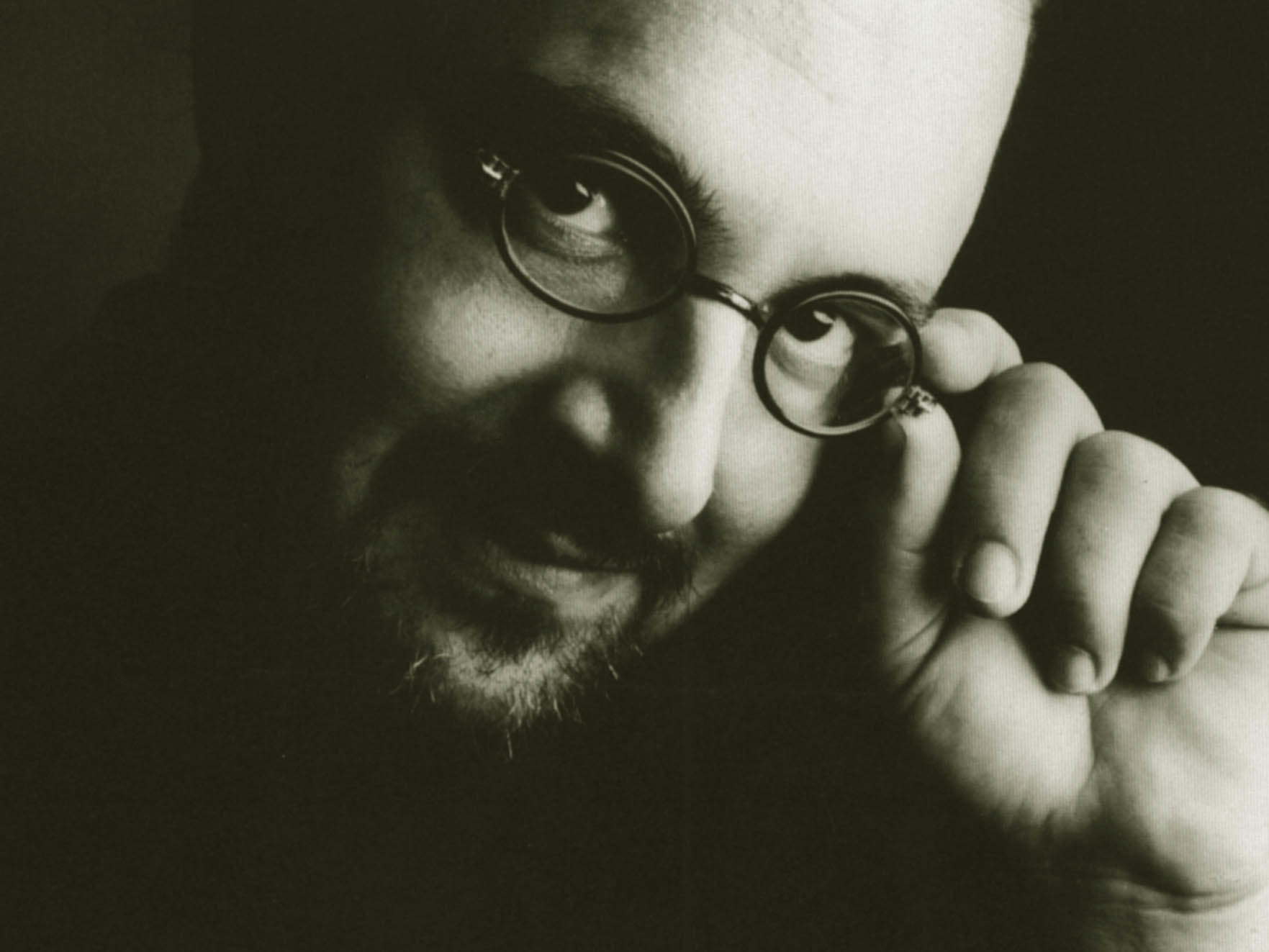
- Photo of Artist Vasily Kafanov
- Born: Vasily Alexeyevich Kafanov; 16 July 1952 (age 74); Moscow, Russia
- Known for: Painting; Illustration
- Spouse: Eteri Lobzhanidze (m. 1980)
- Children: Lucy Kafanov
- Website: Kafanov.com

Vasily Alexeyevich Kafanov (Russian: Василий Алексеевич Кафанов; born 16 July 1952) is a Russian-born painter and illustrator.

His works have been collected in many countries.

His painting style mainly involves the depth of life in different forms. He also uses ceramics, printmaking and sculpture for making his artworks.

== Early life ==
Kafanov was born in Moscow, Russia. His parents were Ludmila and Alexei Kafanov but as they got divorced, he was raised by his grandmother. After finishing school, he was in the Soviet Far East, Kuril Islands, serving in the ranks of the Soviet Armed Forces from 1970 to 1972. He graduated from the Moscow Institute of Art and started his life as a graphic artist and an illustrator. Later on, he graduated from Advanced School of Cinematography and created four short cartoons at the Soyuzmultfilm studio. He married Eteri Lobzhanidze in 1980. Their only child, Lucy Kafanov (born 1982), is a journalist who is a National Correspondent for CNN U.S. based in the Denver bureau.

== Painting style ==
Kafanov used to paint traditional oils on canvas and sometimes on wood panels. Later on, his drawing began to feature a large fish, which popped up in a variety of very strange settings, carrying small chapels and towers on its back. Nowadays, he uses rapidograph and black Japanese ink on acrylic for his paintings. Bright primary colors with yellow backgrounds, as well as much red and green are also used in his paintings. He also worked on different fields of arts with ceramics, welding, sculpture and artifacts concerning alchemy.

== Inspiration and emigration ==
In the late 1980s, when spy thriller The Russia House was made in Russia, its film crew used Kafanov's studio to hold a cast party. Among the guests was the film director and painter Franco Zeffirelli who praised his painting style and played a key role in influencing Kafanov. Throughout his career, Kafanov has also been inspired by the paintings of prominent artists, such as Pablo Picasso, Marc Chagall, Mikhail Shemyakin and Giorgio Morandi. In 1990, Kafanov emigrated to America and started living in New York. His first exhibition in the United States was in the summer of 1990 in San Francisco.

== Works ==
Kafanov paints in many sizes and categories and has numerous auctions and exhibitions in different galleries. His paintings have been reproduced on book covers as well as album covers. He used to work as illustrator for The New York Times. In the late 1990s, he met Billy Corgan, the lead singer of the alternative rock band The Smashing Pumpkins and later was offered to create the cover of their 2000 release Machina, which he believes is one of his best works in his entire career. Other releases Kafanov contributed to are:

- "I of the Mourning", a 2000 single by The Smashing Pumpkins from Machina.
- "Stand Inside Your Love", another Smashing Pumpkins single from Machina.
- "Try, Try, Try", a single by The Smashing Pumpkins from Machina.
- All the full-length albums by post-hardcore/indie rock band mewithoutYou
- A Dream Is a Question You Don't Know How to Answer, the debut 2009 album by Canadian singer-songwriter Jonny Craig.
