= Two Parts Viper =

Studio album by '68
- Released: June 2, 2017
- Genres: noise rock; blues rock
- Length: 32:23
- Labels: Good Fight, Cooking Vinyl
- Producers: Matt Goldman, Josh Scogin

'68 chronology
In Humor and Sadness (2014)	Two Parts Viper (2017)	Love Is Ain't Dead (2020)

Professional ratings
Aggregate scores
Source	Rating
Metacritic	92/100
Review scores
Source	Rating
Alternative Press	5/5 stars
Exclaim!	(9/10)
Kerrang!	4/5 stars
New Noise Magazine	4/5 stars
Rock Sound	(7/10)

Two Parts Viper is the second full-length studio album by '68. The album was released on June 2, 2017.

== Background and composition ==
Vocalist and songwriter Josh Scogin said that the album "is a journey […] meant to be heard as a full statement from Track 1 to Track 10," and that the work is to be taken as a "package—the art, the music, the journey it took to get finished, the songs I deleted, the ones I kept, the struggles and the victories... It all had to happen just the way it did or this album would not exist the way it does."

On the album's title, Scogin said "I was in Australia last year and had a dream where a man in a nice suit and tie came up to me. I would fail if I wasn't two parts viper. The dream was terrifyingly parallel with my mental state and conflict at the time. Even the phrase he used in the dream, 'Two Parts Viper,' shared two different meanings as the dream progressed... it struck me as interesting, and so I used it for the title."

== Reception ==
Two Parts Viper has received critical acclaim from contemporary music critics. On review aggregator website, Metacritic, Two Parts Viper has an aggregate score of 92 out of 100 indicating "universal acclaim".

Ear To The Ground Music described Two Parts Viper as "...a great follow-up record that matches the quality of 68's first, In Humor and Sadness... a hard rock party...a unique record that is difficult to categorize – like The Chariot with more jams, less distorted guitars, and a more relaxed feel."

Lucy Binetti of Paste wrote that Two Parts Viper "...takes the listener on a thrilling musical excursion from start to finish."

== Track listing ==
No.	Title	Length
1.	"Eventually We All Win"	2:00
2.	"Whether Terrified or Unafraid"	3:01
3.	"Without Any Words (Only Crying and Laughter)"	3:18
4.	"This Life Is Old, New, Borrowed and Blue"	3:10
5.	"No Montage"	2:55
6.	"No Apologies"	4:10
7.	"The Workers Are Few"	3:07
8.	"Life Has Its Design"	2:59
9.	"Death Is a Lottery"	3:41
10.	"What More Can I Say"	4:02
Total length:		32:23

Deluxe Edition

Digital deluxe edition bonus tracks
No.	Title	Length
11.	"Summertime Blues"	3:29
12.	"That's the Plan Anyway, Now Figure out How to Follow Through"	2:40
13.	"One Thing, However I Have Found to Be True"	5:02
14.	"Summertime Blues (Director's Cut)"	4:03

== Charts ==
Chart (2017)	Peak position
US Heatseekers Albums (Billboard)	5
US Independent Albums (Billboard)	22
