= Timothy Jordan II =

Tim Jordan
- Born: Timothy Anderson Jordan II; March 8, 1981
- Died: December 13, 2005 (aged 24)
- Genres: Alternative rock; pop rock
- Occupations: Musician; songwriter; vocalist
- Instruments: Keyboards; guitar; vocals
- Years active: 1999–2005
- Labels: Coaster Records, Snapdragon Records, Tooth and Nail Records
- Formerly of: The All-American Rejects, Jonezetta, Number One Fan, Welton, Higgins Switch, India, Green Olive Tree

Timothy (Tim) Anderson Jordan II (March 8, 1981 – December 13, 2005) was an American keyboardist, guitarist, and songwriter. He was primarily known as a touring member of the platinum-selling band, The All-American Rejects.

== Background ==
In 2001, Jordan began his musical career as a second guitarist for the independent Christian rock band Higgins Switch. After Higgins Switch disbanded in 2002, Tim played guitar and keyboard for other Christian bands, most notably Green Olive Tree. In 2003, he enlisted in Snapdragon Records' punk band Welton as the band's primary guitarist. Following a year of touring, Jordan parted ways with Welton and was hired by Number One Fan to provide backing vocals, keyboards, and percussion during live performances. After touring with Number One Fan in 2004, he was recruited by The All-American Rejects. Jordan accepted their offer and toured with The All-American Rejects during the summer and fall of 2005.

Jordan's touring highlights with The All-American Rejects included the 2005 Warped Tour, a Late Show with David Letterman appearance, and performances on Jimmy Kimmel Live! With Jordan on keyboards, The All-American Rejects launched their second hit album, Move Along. In the fall of 2005, Jordan left The All-American Rejects. Shortly after leaving The All-American Rejects, Jordan joined Tooth & Nail rock band Jonezetta. He was appointed as their official fifth member and collaborated on many songs that appear on Jonezetta's first full-length album, Popularity. Weeks before Jordan and Jonezetta were set to record Popularity, Jordan was found dead in his hometown of Camden, Arkansas. His death was ruled a suicide.

On December 22, 2006, a concert in honor of Jordan was held at Juanita's Cantina in Little Rock, Arkansas. Bands/friends of Jordan, As Cities Burn, Jonezetta, India, and The Evidence performed as part of the event. All profits from the memorial concert were donated to a local suicide prevention organization.

In 2007, the band As Cities Burn released a new album, Come Now Sleep. The final track on the album is titled Timothy, a song written about Jordan's death.
