= The Glass Ocean (band) =

American rock band (2006–2009)

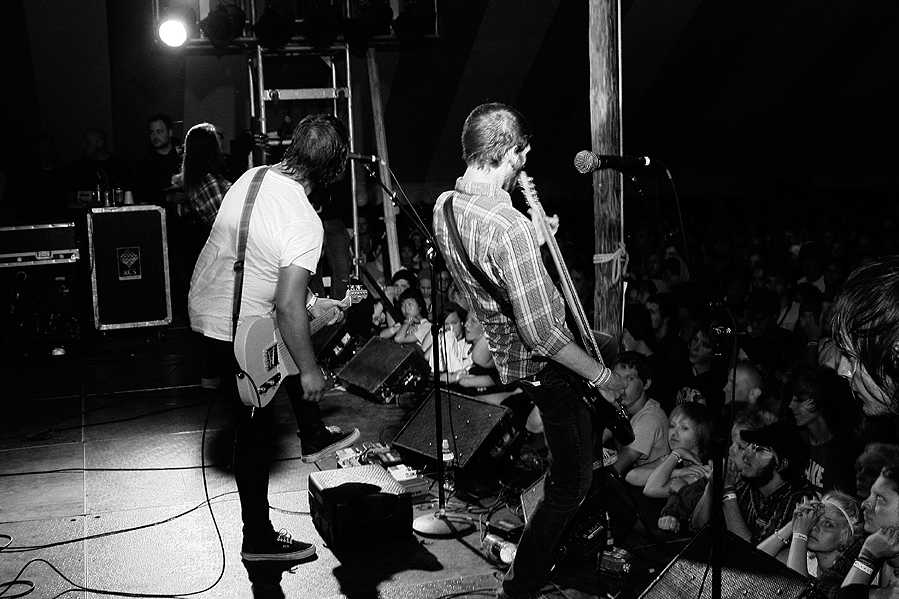
- The Glass Ocean By Trey Moseley, 2008

Background information
- Origin: Atlanta, Georgia, United States
- Genres: Indie rock, Roots rock
- Years active: 2006–2009
- Label: Independent/Self Financed
- Past members: Keller Harbin, Joshua Beiser, Nick Nelson, Heath Ladnier, Justin Graham, Brandon Proff
- Website: www.theglassocean.net

The Glass Ocean was an Indie rock band from Atlanta, Georgia.

== Biography ==
The Glass Ocean began after founding members Keller Harbin and Josh Beiser left The Chariot in May 2006 after releases Everything Is Alive, Everything Is Breathing, Nothing Is Dead, and Nothing Is Bleeding and the Unsung EP. Deciding to take a different approach, The Glass Ocean has gone through a considerably slow evolutionary process. A brief period by Keller Harbin as bassist for Every Time I Die meant that the band did not rush into releasing their music to a wide audience but instead played many local shows in the Atlanta area also stating their desire not to rely on the success of their previous musical endeavors and inevitably rush their music.

The band's first release, the self-financed Put on the Wooden Overcoat EP was released on April 29, 2008 and was made available from the band's website and as a download from iTunes.

The band has stated in interviews that they are not a Christian band, though it continues to be a common misconception.

The band announced the band's end on their Myspace.

== Members ==
- Keller Harbin - Lead Vocals, Guitar (2006–2009) (Every Time I Die, The Chariot)(Holy+Gold)
- Joshua Beiser - Bass (2006–2009) (The Chariot)
- Heath Ladnier - Drums (2007–2009) (Holy+Gold)
- Justin Graham - Guitar (2007–2009) (Holy+Gold)
- Nick Nelson - Guitar (2006–2009)

=== Former members ===
- Brandon Proff - Drums (2007) (Fear Before The March Of Flames)

== Discography ==
- 2008: Put on the Wooden Overcoat (EP)
- 2009: 21 Young Guns Salute (AMP Magazine Compilation)
