= In Humor and Sadness =

Studio album by '68
- Released: July 8, 2014
- Genres: Punk rock, noise rock
- Length: 34:34
- Labels: eOne, Good Fight
- Producers: Matt Goldman, Josh Scogin

'68 chronology
Midnight (2013)	In Humor and Sadness (2014)	Two Parts Viper (2017)

Professional ratings
Review scores
Source	Rating
AllMusic	3.5/5 stars
Alternative Press	4.5/5 stars
The Line of Best Fit	7.5/10

In Humor and Sadness is the first full-length studio album by '68. The album was released on July 8, 2014.

== Writing and recording ==
Guitarist and vocalist Josh Scogin said that he "wrote a lot of the songs and then would go in the studio and record it that day or the next day," and that drummer McClellan would record a song after only hearing it for the first time that day. Said Scogin, "it’s a very impulsive record, very sorta wing-it style, let’s try this, and there’s no time for looking back." A week prior to recording Scogin set up a small studio inside Matt Goldman's studio where he would write and record songs, "four or five, maybe six songs." Once official recording began, the songs were recorded very quickly, since Scogin choosing to leave in the "mistakes," because it felt "very human." Since recording was going too quickly, Scogin had pressure to write more songs, which he enjoyed, saying that he writes "stressful music," and that "you can really feel it."

Josh Scogin used "a lot of very old, vintage combo amps, pushing them way too hard," which resulted in damaging producer Matt Goldman's amps. The sounds of guitars cutting out is because the amps were actually breaking, and those sounds were left in. Michael McClellan has no recollection of this.

== Release and promotion ==
The band announced the release a full-length album on May 28, 2014. On June 2, 2014, the song 'Track 1' was premiered via SoundCloud. On June 9, 2014 'Track 2' was premiered by way of two YouTube videos which needed to be played in sync.

== Track listing ==
All songs written by Josh Scogin.

No.	Title	Length
1.	"Track 1 R"	3:33
2.	"Track 2 e"	2:51
3.	"Track 3 g"	3:48
4.	"Track 4 r"	2:46
5.	"Track 5 e"	2:23
6.	"Track 6 t"	3:34
7.	"Track 7 N"	3:38
8.	"Track 8 o"	2:44
9.	"Track 9 t"	3:46
10.	"Track 10 ."	5:39
Total length:		34:34

== Personnel ==
In Humor and Sadness personnel adapted from CD liner notes.

=== '68 ===
- Michael McClellan – drums
- Josh Scogin – vocals, guitar

=== Additional musicians ===
- B. (Birds in Row) – guest vocals on "Track Three: g"
- Ghost Cat – gang vocals on "Track Three: g"
- Matt Goldman – keys, additional drums and percussion

=== Production ===
- Matt Goldman – recording, producing, mixing
- Josh Scogin – production

=== Artwork ===
- Forefathers – layout, design
- Kyle Kenehan – photos
- Aaron Marsh – photos

== Charting ==
Chart (2014)	Peak position
US Billboard 200	109
US Top Alternative Albums (Billboard)	19
US Top Hard Rock Albums (Billboard)	10
US Heatseekers Albums (Billboard)	2
US Independent Albums (Billboard)	19
US Top Rock Albums (Billboard)	27
