= Hell or High Water (As Cities Burn album) =

Studio album by As Cities Burn
- Released: April 21, 2009
- Genre: Indie rock
- Length: 42:14
- Label: Tooth & Nail
- Producer: Brad Wood

As Cities Burn chronology
Come Now Sleep (2007)	Hell or High Water (2009)	Scream Through the Walls (2019)

Professional ratings
Review scores
Source	Rating
AbsolutePunk.net	(88%) link
The Album Project	4/5 stars
AllMusic	3/5 stars
EastScene	(10/10)
Indie Vision Music	(10/10)
Jesus Freak Hideout	4.5/5 stars
Patrol Magazine	(7.8/10)
PunkDisasters	4.5/5 stars

Hell or High Water is the third full-length album by Christian indie rock band As Cities Burn. According to a MySpace post, frontman Cody Bonnette and a friend of the band, Tyler Orr, recorded the album almost entirely themselves, In the small town of Cleveland Tennessee, on first street. It was released on April 21, 2009, through Tooth & Nail Records. This album also features guest vocals from original lead vocalist T.J. Bonnette, on the songs "84 Sheepdog" and "Gates", as well as some from Robert Chisolm of Jonezetta and Micah Boyce from So Long Forgotten on the song "Capo". The album charted at No. 109 on the Billboard 200 in its first week. The hidden track in the pregap was uploaded on the MySpace page of singer Cody under the name "Aerial".

== Track listing ==
No.	Title	Length
0.	"Aerial" (hidden track)	1:37
1.	"'84 Sheepdog"	3:08
2.	"Errand Rum"	3:18
3.	"Into the Sea"	4:32
4.	"Made Too Pretty"	4:06
5.	"Lady Blue"	6:20
6.	"Petty"	3:40
7.	"Daughter"	3:13
8.	"Pirate Blues"	4:09
9.	"Capo"	4:00
10.	"Gates"	5:48
Total length:		42:14
