= Long Live (The Chariot album) =

Studio album by The Chariot
- Released: November 23, 2010
- Recorded: 2010
- Studio: Glow in the Dark Studios, Atlanta, Georgia
- Genre: Metalcore, mathcore
- Length: 30:29
- Label: Good Fight
- Producer: Matt Goldman

The Chariot chronology
Wars and Rumors of Wars (2009)	Long Live (2010)	One Wing (2012)

Professional ratings
Review scores
Source	Rating
AllMusic	3/5 stars
BLARE Magazine	3.5/5 stars
Blistering	5.5/10 stars
Jesus Freak Hideout	4/5 stars
MetalInjection.net	4.5/5 stars
Rock Sound	9/10 stars

Long Live is the fourth studio album by The Chariot, released on November 23, 2010.

== Writing and recording ==
Prior to recording Long Live, Matt Goldman, the producer of all of The Chariot's albums to date, contacted the group in early 2010 and showed his interest in recording their next album live to analog magnetic tape. The act of recording an album live, as opposed to recording each instrument individually and digitally mixing it together later, has been used by The Chariot to achieve a more raw sound. This process was used entirely on their debut album, Everything Is Alive, Everything Is Breathing, Nothing Is Dead, and Nothing Is Bleeding in 2004. At least one song off of Long Live was recorded in this manner.

== Release and promotion ==
Shortly after the release of their previous album, Wars and Rumors of Wars, the band held a contest for its promotion through their Myspace blog. Readers were instructed to obtain one of each of the band members' signatures through purchasing copies of Wars, since Wars' CD cases were hand-stamped and each was signed by a different member. The first five people to do so would have a track on the band's next album named after them. The "name" tracks, as they appear on Long Live, are in the order of the winners, from first to last.

Long Live was The Chariot's first album released through the newly formed label Good Fight Music after putting out their prior three studio albums through Solid State Records. Founded in early 2010, Good Fight was created by Paul Conroy and Carl Severson formerly of Ferret Music. Vocalist Josh Scogin described working with a new label as "exciting" and "fresh," and also stated "So far, the relationship has been quite a pleasant one. We seem to be very much on the same page, and I am stoked to see what shakes loose." Long Live was the ninth album released by Good Fight Music.

A music video for the song "David De La Hoz" was released on October 19, 2010. The video was filmed live in a single take, and also features the guests Timbre playing the harp and Dan Smith of Listener performing spoken word poetry or Talk Music as Smith refers to it.

In early 2011, The Chariot released a 7" vinyl single limited to 1,000 copies titled "Music of a Grateful Heart." The A-Side featured the song "Music of a Grateful Heart," which was an unreleased track from the Long Live sessions, and "Graciously," which is an extended alternate version of "The Audience." The B-Side features a laser etching of The Chariot's skull logo as seen on the band's merchandise and in the background of the album art for Long Live. "Music for a Grateful Heart" was pressed in four different colors limited to 250 copies each and are also hand numbered. The different pressings were each distributed through different means: from live performances, through the band's official webstore, local indie retailers and through Hot Topic.

== Track listing ==
No.	Title	Length
1.	"Evan Perks"	1:36
2.	"The Audience"	2:15
3.	"Calvin Makenzie"	2:14
4.	"The City"	3:57
5.	"Andy Sundwall"	2:53
6.	"The Earth"	2:46
7.	"David De La Hoz" (featuring Dan Smith)	4:15
8.	"The Heavens"	2:12
9.	"Robert Rios"	2:31
10.	"The King"	5:50

== Personnel ==
The Chariot

- Josh Scogin – Lead vocals
- Stephen Harrison – Guitar, Vocals
- Jon Terrey – Guitar, Vocals
- Jon Kindler – Bass, Vocals
- David Kennedy – Drums

Production

- Produced, Engineered & mixed by Matt Goldman
- Additional vocals by Paul Wood, Justin Dacus, Josh Fletcher, Amber Leone, Anna Sarkisian, Rebekah Joiner, Logan Shawver, Taylor Harlow, Jeffrey Hardy, Emily Stover, Whitney Jetton & Eryn Erickson (4)
- Various instruments, Keyboard & percussion by Matt Goldman
- Harp by Timbre Cierpke (7)
- Horn section by Dan Smith (10)
- Layout by Sons Of Nero
- Photo by Brian Hall
