= The Fiancée (album) =

Studio album by The Chariot
- Released: April 3, 2007
- Genre: Hardcore; metalcore
- Length: 29:34
- Label: Solid State
- Producer: Matt Goldman

The Chariot chronology
Unsung EP (2005)	The Fiancée (2007)	Wars and Rumors of Wars (2009)

Professional ratings
Review scores
Source	Rating
AbsolutePunk.net	79%
AllMusic	4/5 stars
Alternative Press	4/5 stars
Cross Rhythms	8/10 stars
Jesus Freak Hideout	3.5/5 stars
Music Emissions	5/5 stars
Punk News	3/5 stars

The Fiancée is the second full-length album from the band The Chariot released on April 3, 2007. It was the final release by the band to feature drummer Jake Ryan; it was also the only release until Long Live to feature guitarist Jon Terrey, and the first and only release with guitarist Dan Eaton.

== Track listing ==
No.	Title	Length
1.	"Back to Back"	1:33
2.	"They Faced Each Other"	2:01
3.	"They Drew Their Swords"	2:31
4.	"And Shot Each Other"	4:00
5.	"The Deaf Policemen"	2:43
6.	"Heard This Noise"	2:44
7.	"Then Came to Kill" (featuring Hayley Williams of Paramore)	5:00
8.	"The Two Dead Boys"	2:36
9.	"Forgive Me Nashville"	3:11
10.	"The Trumpet"	3:17

== Album ==
On The Fiancée, the first eight track titles make up a passage from a poem, of which multiple variants are found online, but it is often called "The Backward Rhyme" or "Contradiction Poem". Following the opening lines, "One bright day in the middle of the night / two dead boys got up to fight," it continues along the lines of:

Poem	Track name	Track listing
Back to back they faced each other,	Back to Back, They Faced Each Other	Tracks 1 and 2
drew their swords and shot each other.	They Drew* Their Swords, And Shot Each Other	Tracks 3 and 4
A deaf policeman heard the noise,	The Deaf Policemen, Heard This Noise	Tracks 5 and 6
and came and killed the two dead boys.	Then Came to Kill, The Two Dead Boys	Tracks 7 and 8

*The back of the album has "They Drew Their Swords" for track three.

The song "And Shot Each Other" is a redone version of the previously unreleased song "Elvish Presley" and "Then Came To Kill" is a redone version of the song "Kenny Gibler (Play The Piano Like A Disease)" from the Unsung EP.

Paramore vocalist Hayley Williams is featured on "Then Came To Kill", the remake of "Kenny Gibler (Play the Piano Like a Disease)".

Sacred Harp singers are featured on "And Shot Each Other" and "The Trumpet". They are also featured in the movie Awake, My Soul.

The name of the Sacred Harp featured at the end of "And Shot Each Other" is called "77t: The Child Of Grace".

There is a video that has been released for the track "They Drew Their Swords," and one has been shot in New York for "Forgive Me Nashville."

The song "Forgive Me Nashville" was featured in This Is Solid State Volume 6 as part of a Christian metal compilation series. This song was named as an apology to the fans in Nashville - Josh Scogin, the vocalist, felt they gave a poor performance at a show in Nashville, Tennessee. The harmonica heard for the last thirty-four seconds of this song is by mewithoutYou's Aaron Weiss. The final song is called "The Trumpet" which refers to the Sacred Harp hymn "149: The Trumpet", in other hymnals also called "Awful Pomp of Judgement" or "The Chariot".

The music video for "They Faced Each Other," was a compilation of four thousand photographs taken during a photoshoot/performance for the video, and according to the video's introduction, over ten-thousand were actually taken during the "taping". Music videos for "They Drew Their Swords" and "Forgive Me Nashville" (New York) have also been shot.

== Personnel ==
- Josh Scogin - Vocals
- Jon Terrey - Guitar
- Dan Eaton - Guitar
- Jon Kindler - Bass
- Jake Ryan - Drums

== Awards ==
In 2008, the album was nominated for a Dove Award for Recorded Music Packaging of the Year at the 39th GMA Dove Awards.
