= Timothy Jordan =

Timothy Jordan may refer to:

- Timothy Jordan II (1981–2005), American musician
- Timothy S. Jordan (1827–?), member of the Wisconsin State Assembly
