= Midnight ('68 EP) =

- Original 2013 artwork. The No Sleep Records reissue cover art pays homage to Nirvana's 1989 debut album Bleach.

EP by '68
- Released: December 2013
- Recorded: Glow in the Dark Studios in Atlanta, Georgia
- Genre: Punk rock
- Length: 6:12
- Label: self-released
- Producers: Matt Goldman, Josh Scogin

'68 chronology
| Midnight (2013) | In Humor and Sadness (2014) |

Midnight is the debut EP from the American noise rock band '68. The album was originally self-released by the band online in December 2013 as a 7" vinyl record. Lead singer and guitarist Josh Scogin estimated that the original pressing of 1,500 copies sold out in about 8 or 9 hours. It was reissued by No Sleep Records on April 1, 2014 with new cover art paying homage Nirvana's 1989 debut album Bleach.

== Track listing ==
1. "Three Is a Crowd" – 2:42
2. "Third Time Is a Charm" – 3:30

== Personnel ==
- Michael McClellan – drums
- Josh Scogin – vocals, guitar
