= '68 (band) =

American rock band (2013–2026)

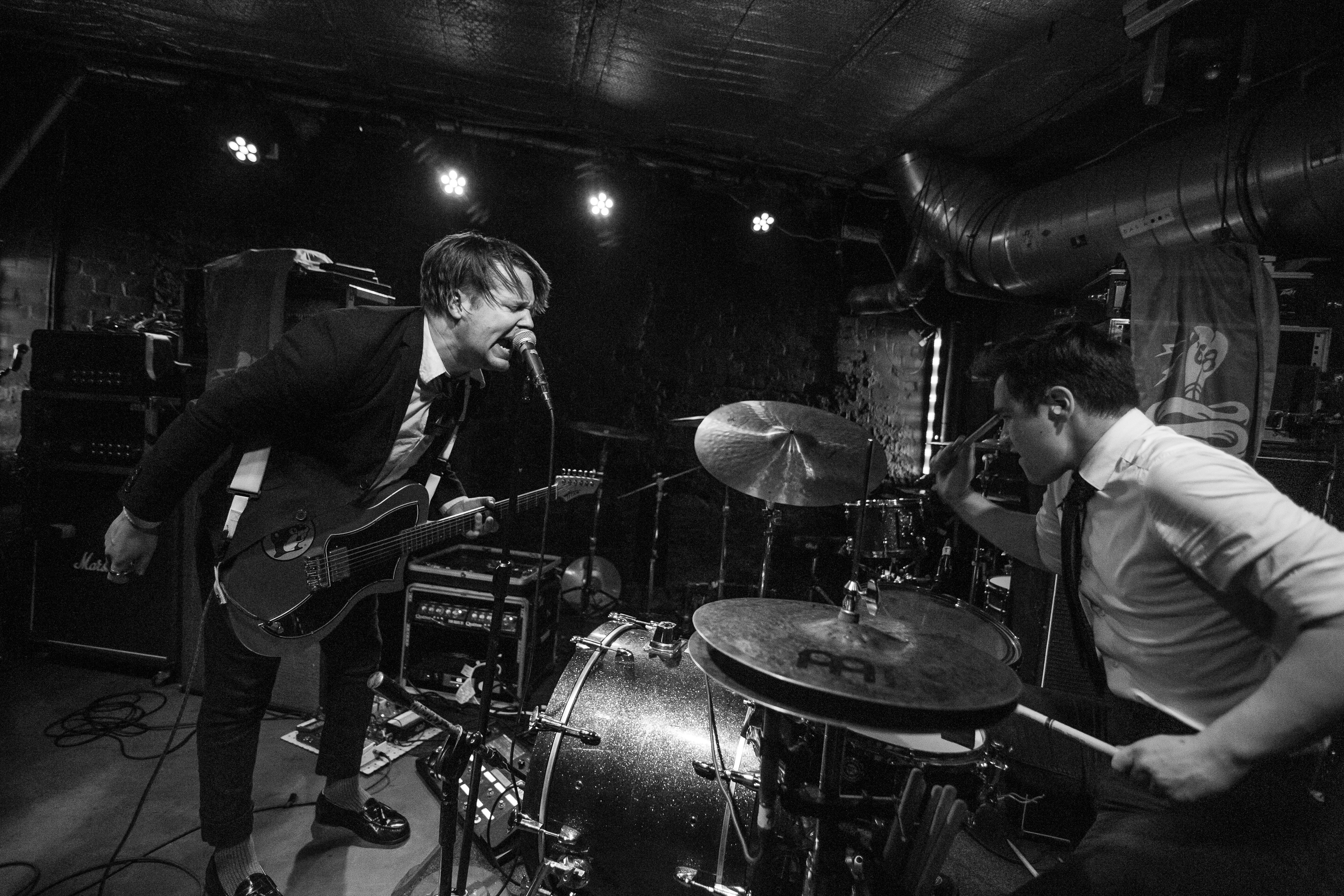
- Josh Scogin and Nikko Yamada of '68 performing in February 2018

Background information
- Origin: Atlanta, Georgia, U.S.
- Genres: Punk rock, noise rock
- Years active: 2013–2026
- Labels: eOne, Good Fight, No Sleep, Cooking Vinyl, Pure Noise
- Spinoff of: The Chariot
- Past members: Josh Scogin; Nikko Yamada; Michael McClellan
- Website: theyare68.com

'68 was an American noise rock band from Atlanta, Georgia. Formed in 2013 by guitarist and vocalist Josh Scogin and drummer Michael McClellan, the band comprised Scogin and drummer Nikko Yamada until their disbandment in 2026.

== History ==
Josh Scogin's former band, The Chariot, played their final show in November 2013. Just over a week later, Scogin teased an announcement with a countdown timer on the website theyare68.com; when the timer ended in December 2013, Scogin revealed that he had formed a new band named '68 and posted a two-song EP, Midnight, for sale online. The title of the EP and its two songs – "Three Is a Crowd" and "Third Time Is a Charm" – were significant to Scogin; the use of the number three in the song titles represented the third act of his life following his stints in Norma Jean and the Chariot, and Scogin also explained that the number three represents "that thought process of continuing on in my head: 'Three's a charm,' oh, this is gonna be great or 'three's a crowd,' like we should've stuck with the Chariot." The band's name, meanwhile, came from his late father's '68 Camaro. The initial pressing of Midnight sold out in less than one day; independent record label No Sleep Records re-released it with new artwork on 1 April 2014.

The band toured in April and May 2014, opening for Chiodos, Emarosa, Our Last Night, and Hands Like Houses, and in May 2014 announced their signing to Good Fight Music and eOne Music to release their debut album In Humor and Sadness, which was released two months later on 8 July 2014.

The first song the band officially released, "Track Two: e", was written by Scogin while still a member of The Chariot, but Scogin said the song didn't fit into any of The Chariot's projects. It resurfaced for him as '68 was forming, and became the band's first single. "Track Two: e" was initially released on YouTube as a pair videos, each with separate tracks that had to be played in unison in order to hear the song correctly. Scogin said of releasing the song this way: "[S]omeone will have one computer and invite a friend over that has another computer, they will spend several minutes struggling and laughing at trying to sync up the two videos perfectly." The song "Track One: R" was also available for online streaming ahead of the album's release, and in August, they released a music video for "Track One: R" directed by former Norma Jean and Underoath member Daniel Davison. The band's first tour in support of In Humor and Sadness featured Listener (whose vocalist Dan Smith previously guested on the Chariot's 2010 album, Long Live) and Homeless Gospel Choir.

Scogin and McClellan entered the studio in January 2016 to work on their second album, and a few months later posted a demo from the then-upcoming album to YouTube on 14 March 2016.

A few months after the release of Two Parts Viper, McClellan was revealed to have parted ways with Scogin. During the tour, Nikko Yamada replaced McClellan as the band's new drummer.

In September 2020, the band released their second EP, Love Is Ain't Dead. In January 2021, they announced their third album, Give One Take One, which was released on March 26. In August 2023, the band announced their fourth studio album, entitled Yes, And..., along with the release of its lead single "Removed Their Hooks". The album was released on September 29, 2023.

In March 2026, the band announced that both their then-unannounced fifth studio album and its subsequent supporting tour would be their last. The final studio album, entitled They Are Survived, was released on May 28, 2026. Its first single, "Always Love", was debuted on March 31 to coincide with the album's announcement. Their final show was played on June 20, 2026, at the Masquerade in their hometown of Atlanta, Georgia.

== Band members ==
Final lineup

- Josh Scogin – vocals, guitar (2013–2026)
- Nikko Yamada – drums (2017–2026)

Former

- Michael McClellan – drums (2013–2017)

== Discography ==
=== Studio albums ===
List of studio albums, with selected chart positions and certifications
| Title | Album details | Peak chart positions | | | | | |
| Title | Album details | US | US Alternative | US Hard Rock | US Heatseekers | US Indie | US Rock |
|---|---|---|---|---|---|---|---|
| In Humor and Sadness | Released: July 8, 2014; Label: eOne, Good Fight; Formats: CD, LP, digital download | 109 | 19 | 10 | 2 | 19 | 27 |
| Two Parts Viper | Released: June 2, 2017; Label: Good Fight, Cooking Vinyl; Formats: CD, LP, digital download | — | — | — | 5 | 22 | — |
| Give One Take One | Released: March 26, 2021; Label: Cooking Vinyl | — | — | — | — | — | — |
| Yes, And... | Released: September 29, 2023; Label: Pure Noise Records | — | — | — | — | — | — |
| They Are Survived | Released: May 28, 2026; Label: Pure Noise Records | — | — | — | — | — | — |

=== EPs ===
- Midnight (2013, self-released)
- Summertime Blues (2018)
- Love Is Ain't Dead (2020)

=== Compilation appearances ===
- Warped Tour 2015 Compilation – "The Human Calculus" (2015, SideOneDummy)

=== Music videos ===
- "Track 1 R" (2014)
  - Directed by Daniel Davison
- "Track 2 E" (2014)
- "Track 5 E" (2014)
- "Track 7 N" (2015)
- "Track 9 T" (2015)
- "The Workers Are Few" (2017)
- "Eventually We All Win" (2017)
- "Whether Terrified or Unafraid" (2018)
- "Without Any Words (Only Crying and Laughter)" (2018)
- "Bad Bite" (2021)
- "The Knife, The Knife, The Knife" (2021)
- "Removed Their Hooks" (2023)
- "Removed Their Hats" (2023)
