= The Glass Ocean =

The Glass Ocean may refer to:

- The Glass Ocean (band), an American indie rock band
- The Glass Ocean (novel), a 2018 novel by Beatriz Williams, Lauren Willig, and Karen White
