= Cleanhead =

Cleanhead or Clean head may refer to:

- Clean Head, a 2010 EP by the band Oceana
- Elmore James, an American blues guitarist, singer, songwriter and bandleader
- Eddie Vinson, an American saxophonist and blues shouter
