= Love Is Ain't Dead =

EP by '68
- Released: September 4, 2020
- Genre: noise rock; blues rock
- Label: Cooking Vinyl
- Producer: Nick Raskulinecz; Josh Scogin

'68 chronology
Two Parts Viper (2017)	Love Is Ain't Dead (2020)	Give One Take One (2021)

Love Is Ain't Dead is an EP by American noise rock band, '68. The EP was released on September 4, 2020 through Cooking Vinyl.

== Track listing ==
1. "Bad Bad Lambo" –03:59
2. "The Lesser of Two Upheavals" – 3:40
3. "Rock On" (David Essex cover) – 3:26
4. "Nervous Passenger" – 4:15

== Critical reception ==
Professional ratings
Review scores
Source	Rating
Alt Press	Positive
Dead Press	7/10
HM	4/5 stars

Love Is Ain't Dead was well received by music critics. Jason Pettigrew, writing for Alt Press, said that Love Is Ain't Dead "continues to deliver sonic wonderment and some much-needed personal redemption". Damon Taylor, writing for Dead Press, gave the album a 7 out of 10, saying that '68 "delves deeper into distorted melodies and sludgy grooves, the record continues to cement the disruptive and frantic take on blues that the duo has become known for."

Nao Lewandowski, writing for Christian music magazine, HM, gave the EP 4 stars out of 5. Lewandowski said the EP has "experimental sounds and bold rhythms are certainly not the mark of traditional rock, but it’s clear from the beginning that ’68 was aiming for something a bit more abstract." Lewandowski summarized the EP with, "in all that electric distortion and “raw nerve,” the band delivers with complete control. With only four songs on the EP, each track creates a gradual-yet-immediate unraveling of traditional hardcore, doubling down on the claims of their juxtaposition."
