= Polyenso =

American experimental rock band

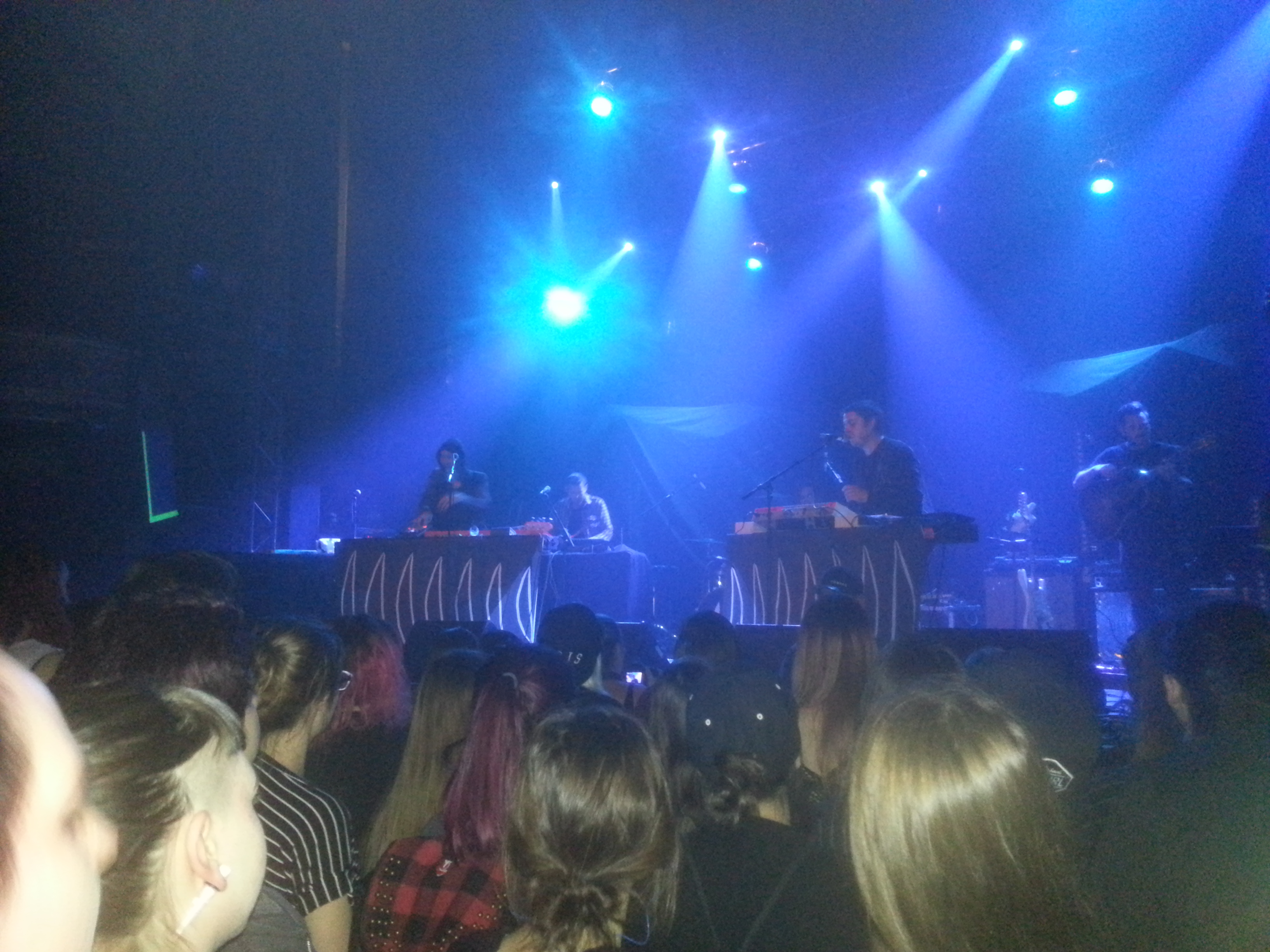
- Polyenso performing at the Corona Theatre in Montreal

Background information
- Also known as: Oceana (2007–2012)
- Origin: St. Petersburg, Florida, U.S.
- Genres: Experimental rock, indie rock, post-hardcore (early)
- Years active: 2007–present
- Labels: Rise; Tone Tree; Dog Radio; Other People
- Members: Brennan Taulbee; Alexander Schultz; Denny Agosto
- Past members: Keith Jones; Jack Burns; Michael Norris; James O'Brien; Robbie Davis; Hunter Moore Christian Matthews Keller

Polyenso is an American experimental rock band based in St. Petersburg, Florida, United States.

The band is composed of lead vocalist and keyboardist Brennan Taulbee, multi-instrumentalist and vocalist Alexander Schultz, and percussionist Denny Agosto. The band's members were all at one point in American post-hardcore band Oceana, but moved to lighter, more uplifting music under the name Polyenso in 2012. Their sound is a blend of indie rock, electronic, folk, jazz, and hip-hop.

They released their debut album, One Big Particular Loop, on January 22, 2013. On October 16, 2015, the band released EP1 featuring four tracks from their upcoming second album, Pure in the Plastic. The album, released on April 1, 2016, featured a more pop-inspired sound, without the trumpet playing of their debut album.

Later that year, Alternative Press named the band one of the Top 16 Bands to Watch.

== Oceana ==
The band formed as Oceana in 2007 and beginning with a post-hardcore sound. They were signed to Rise Records, which released their debut album titled The Tide on March 4, 2008, followed by the album Birth.Eater on May 19, 2009. The original members of Oceana had previously been in other bands in the Tampa - St. Petersburg area such as Noreen, and Aissur Ahtom. In 2008, Oceana released their debut album "The Tide" through Rise Records. Shortly after the album release the vocalist, Keith Jones, left the band for personal reasons. The band then picked up Brennan Taulbee who contributed both screaming and clean vocals. In a recent interview, Taulbee said that he was supposed to play keyboards and third guitar for the band's upcoming release but due to the departure of Jones, Brennan filled in the role as Oceana's frontman.

Soon after the vocalist change, Oceana released a single demo track titled 'Creations' which was Brennan's debut as front man. They released their second album, entitled Birth.Eater on May 26 through Rise Records. The band was set to tour alongside Silverstein, Poison the Well, and The Sleeping. On April 3, at midnight, they released two new tracks from their upcoming release "Birth.Eater" entitled "Mother Love", and "The Family Disease". Birth.Eater reached No. 48 on the Billboard Heatseekers chart. In mid 2009 the band filmed their first ever music video for the song "The Family Disease" of Birth.Eater album. However it took them more than half a year to release it due to the sudden breakup few weeks later.

=== Disbanding ===
Oceana was embarking a US tour with Fear Before, Of Machines, Memphis May Fire, and This Time Next Year from July 9 to August 7 before breaking up. According to the band's MySpace, Oceana has disbanded as of 6/19/09 stating the following:

Dear fans,

We know a lot of rumors have been circulating around about us. We're sorry we left you hanging so long on this blog. But unfortunately the rumors are true. Oceana has broken up. We apologize to all of our fans. You are amazing and are the only ones who made this worth while. We love you. Thanks to everyone who picked up our new cd. We all put our heart and soul into birtheater and are very proud of the album.

This breakup has nothing to do with any one member. We're all best friends and we all sat down and talked this through. It's not that we are not happy with the response from the new album. We knew the change would be a bit rocky and our kind of music isn't exactly whats popular right now. A lot of kids would rather listen to songs riddled with breakdowns and over auto-tuned vocals. That is exactly why we appreciate our fans so much, you guys aren't just going with the trend. We all decided that our hearts were in different places at this time in our lives. We're all young and we guarantee this won't be the last you hear of us. Maybe you'll get five new bands out of the deal.

Again we apologize for letting anyone down and we hope you will all support us in our future endeavors.

We love you all and thanks for making this amazing.

love, Brennan, Alex, Denny, Jack, and Rob

In late 2009 Brennan and Denny Agosto have unveiled a new project titled "TROME" (The Rest Of Mother Earth) which was to feature softer, indie-rock music and have released a new demo without a permanent title.

They debuted a lighter indie rock sound with their EP Clean Head released on May 11, 2010.

=== Back to life ===
As of October 4, 2009, the 'R.I.P' that stood before their Myspace name was gone, starting rumors that the band has gotten back together. Also, Brennan and Denny both added the Oceana banner back onto their Myspace pages, continuing the rumors of a possible reformation. On November 3, 2009 Oceana reformed as a band. Rob and Alex were reported to have left the band and a new bass player, Kolby Crider was brought in. Since then they have been performing as a 4-piece band.

The band posted this bulletin stating the reformation:

Thats Right were Back!! After a few months of thought and ton of discussions, we (Denny, Jack, Brennan) have decided to bring our true love back to life, our love for music. Rob and Alex have decided to take a different route on the road of life and we support them in their decisions and are still best friends with no hard feelings. With these losses, we would love to welcome our newest member of the OCEANA family - our new bassist (Kolby Crider.) So for all of you who are fans new or old, thank you for your continued support during our broken up period of time. We Love you all and hope to see you soon.

Shortly after the reformation the band finally released the music video for 'The Family Disease' which can be watched on their official Myspace page. In January 2010 Alex Schultz was reported playing a show with the band, with some sources saying that he has joined back. On January 25 the band went on to record their new EP. The EP was released May 11, 2010 exclusively through Hot Topic, and it's entitled "Clean Head".

Recently a short clip of a new song has been heard on the end of a sampler on Distort Entertainment's page for Oceana.

Shortly before the Oh, Sleeper tour, original guitarist Jack Burns was kicked out due to conflicts of interest. Brennan Taulbee is featured on Nidus/Expire's new song "Mr Grey" from their upcoming "Many Hands EP".

On August 14, 2010 Oceana posted an update on their Myspace stating they were in the process of writing another album expected in Spring 2011. The update also stated a U.S. tour was in the works for October/November.

It was announced on December 1 that Oceana has left Rise Records.

Recently from a tweet Oceana has stated that "We've been putting a lot of time and effort into our new tunes. Day after day, night after night (still alive). Surprises coming soon.."

Recently Oceana has released two videos entitled "A Fonder Reel Part I" and "A Fonder Reel Part II" that are filmed by photographer/designer James Lano. These videos can be viewed on theundesigned.com and feature updated information and a new song.

Oceana released A Fonder Reel Take III on April 19. The video is shot during the bands jam session/ photo shoot with Gage Young and James Lano. The video also introduces new female member who will be added as piano player and back-up vocalist.

In July 2011, Oceana officially announced that they are in the studio to record their third full-length album. They have posted on Twitter video updates of the recording process including songs called "Dog Radio" and "Counting Fish" as well as several others.

On April 15, 2012, the band officially started a Kickstarter to fund their new album. The album will be released sometime in December 2012.

We've been trying to figure out the words to describe the journey we've taken in writing this record... It's quite hard to define the roller coaster of emotion and difficult situations we put ourselves through because of our passion for music. But it's safe to say it has been a learning experience, making up better musicians and people. The past two years we have written, discarded, and re-written, over and over. Now, we finally have a record that we could not be more proud of. We’re ready to share this music with the world! We've heard some talk about Kickstarter, and how it's helped passionate people achieve an important goal. Since we're in a "make or break" spot, we figured it's our best option. It's scary to even think about, but this may be our only hope! So, after a few months of brainstorming, shooting, and editing with help from our good friend James Lano, we put this video together for you. The idea of the video is to summarize what we've been working on for the last 2 years. If we reach our goal in these forty five days, we plan to record the album within the following months. We will tour again with our new record out by Fall 2012! Any extra money given over our goal of $10,000 will be used for distribution, tours, festivals, and getting our music to your ears. We are all so thankful for this band and where it has gotten us. We also want to thank our fans, friends, and families for helping us get to this point. The least we can do is give it all back to you. We would love your help. You're forever appreciated!

On April 26, 2012 Oceana released a live video of their new song filmed by filmmaker Ryan Zarra for St. Pete Beat.

In July 2012, they went back into the studio to record their third studio album, One Big Particular Loop, with Matt Goldman at Glow in the Dark Studios. The album was released January 22, 2013.

During the recording process, Oceana changed their band name to Polyenso and are releasing the album OBPL under the new name.

By the end of 2013 the band started to indicate productions on the second Polyenso album. Later during October 2014 they released a teaser for a new song entitled '17 New Years' which gained positive reaction from fans. The song was released on October 24, 2014 On January 5, 2015 they released the second single entitled 'Moona Festival' Later in June the band published an interactive music video that used photos of their fans sent via E-mail. The song was named 'Best of Friends'. Soon they released a new music video for 'Soda Pop Fiction' However the song was not going to be included in the album. In the same month they announced the new album name would be 'Pure in the Plastic' On July 26, 2015 they released another single 'Osaka Son' On October 8, 2015 the band stated that there were difficulties releasing the album and the 4 singles would be compiled into an EP which was released under the name 'EP1' around October 16, 2015.

== Members ==
- Brennan Taulbee - lead vocals, guitar, piano (since 2008)
- Alex Schultz - guitar, backing vocals (2007–2009, since 2010)
- Denny Agosto - drums, backing vocals (since 2008)

Former

- Keith Jones - lead vocals (2007–2008) (was in Decoder and Wolf:Speak, currently in Chandelier)
- James O'Brien - drums, (2007–2008)
- Robert Davis - bass (2007–2009)
- Jack Burns - guitars (2007–2010) (Currently in Sleepwave)
- Hunter Moore - keyboards, vocals (2011)
- Kolby Crider - bass (2009-2014)

== Discography ==
=== Studio albums ===
Title	Release date	Label
The Tide	March 4, 2008	Rise
Birth.Eater	May 26, 2009	Rise
One Big Particular Loop	January 22, 2013	self-released
Pure in the Plastic	April 1, 2016	Tone Tree

=== EPs ===
Title	Release date
Clean Head	May 11, 2010
EP1	October 16, 2015
Year of the Dog	January 18, 2019

=== Singles ===
Title	Release date
Pocket Knife Shadow	October 15, 2021

=== Demos ===
Title	Release date	Label
Creations	July 25, 2008	Rise

=== Music videos ===
Video	Year	Director(s)
"The Family Disease"	2009	Caleb Mallery
"Best Of Friends"	2015	James Lano & Alexander Schultz
"Soda Pop Fiction"	2015	Ryan Shuck
"17 New Years"	2016	Masood Ahmed

=== Album appearances ===
Member	Album				Instrument
Member	The Tide	Birth.Eater	Clean Head EP	One Big Particular Loop	Instrument
Keith Jones	✓	✗	✗	✗	Vocals
Alex Schultz	✓	✓	✓	✓	Guitar, Vocals
Jack Burns	✓	✓	✓	✗	Guitar
Robbie Davis	✓	✓	✗	✗	Bass
James O'Brien	✓	✗	✗	✗	Drums, Vocals
Brennan Taulbee	✗	✓	✓	✓	Vocals
Denny Agosto	✗	✓	✓	✓	Drums
Kolby Crider	✗	✗	✓	✓	Bass
