= Sonnet to Sleep =

American indie rock band formed in 2005

- Also known as: The Love Affair
- Origin: Lakeland, Florida, United States
- Genres: Indie rock, christian rock
- Years active: 2005–present
- Label: South Pawl
- Members: Aaron Rios
- Past members: Ben Mattox

Sonnet to Sleep is an indie rock band from Lakeland, Florida which was formed in 2005.

== Band history ==
Originally called The Love Affair, Sonnet to Sleep changed their name upon signing to Nashville-based indie label South Pawl Records in 2008, due to the name conflict with the London-based pop band Love Affair from the 1960s. Prior to signing a licensing deal with South Pawl Records, Sonnet to Sleep recorded their self-titled EP with Matt Goldman at Glow in the Dark Studios and Matt Malpass at Marigolds and Monsters Studios both located in Atlanta, Ga. and released it independently selling over 1000 copies backed by over 250 shows before re-releasing their self-titled EP with South Pawl Records. They also covered "Come Undone" originally by Duran Duran along with an accompanying video, and have released a second EP independently entitled Angels Fall.

April 2014, they released Affirmative Say Nothing.

According to their website, they claim to be working on a full-length album with Producer Aaron Marsh of the band Copeland in his Lakeland, Fl studio The Vanguard Room

== Band members ==
- Aaron Rios – vocals, Piano, Mellotron, lead guitar

=== Former members ===
- Ben Mattox – drums (2008–2010)

== Discography ==
- 2008: "Sonnet to Sleep"
- 2010: "Angels Fall"

Compilations

- "Come Undone" appears on All Together Separate
