= Georgia Webster =

American country music singer

- Born: January 8, 2003 (age 22); Hampden, Massachusetts, U.S.
- Occupation: Singer
- Instruments: Guitar
- Years active: 2020–present
- Labels: Sony Music Nashville; River House Artists
- Website: www.itsgeorgiawebster.com

Georgia Webster (born January 8, 2003) is a social media personality and American country music singer signed to Sony Music Nashville. She first gained prominence when her song “Tell Your Mom” went viral on TikTok. She released her major label debut, First Goodbye, in July 2021.

== Early life and debut EP ==
Born and raised in Hampden, Massachusetts, Webster was inspired to start writing after reading the Harry Potter books, starting with short stories then gradually shifting into songwriting. Inspired by singers such as Miley Cyrus, Carrie Underwood, John Mayer, and Keane, Webster began taking music seriously as a teenager and attended the Berklee College of Music summer songwriting workshop. Shortly afterward, she released a clip of her song "Tell Your Mom" on TikTok, and the video amassed over two million views in just a few days.

Webster soon linked with guitarist/producer Paul DiGiovanni, who helped her complete a full version of "Tell Your Mom."

Webster signed a record deal with Sony Music Nashville in March 2021 and concurrently released her follow-up single, "Push & Pull." After unveiling her introductory EP, First Goodbye, just a few months later, she was invited to join Ingrid Andress as direct support on her international Feeling Things Tour.

In June 2023, Webster joined Kelsea Ballerini on her HEARTFIRST Tour through the summer, and is continuing to support Ballerini, alongside Ingrid Andress, on her one night only Homecoming Show in Knoxville, Tennessee in November 2023.

== Discography ==
=== Extended Plays ===
- First Goodbye (Sony Music Nashville, 2021)
- Chapter 1: Things We're Not Saying - EP (Sony Music Nashville, 2022)
- SIGNS (Sony Music Nashville, 2024)

=== Singles ===
- "Tell Your Mom" (Independent, 2020)
- "Push & Pull" (Sony Music Nashville, 2021)
- "I Hate Phone Calls (Long Distance Sucks)" (Sony Music Nashville, 2022)
- "Attention" (Sony Music Nashville, 2024)
- "Delusional" (Sony Music Nashville, 2024)
- "This Ain't a Breakup (feat. Nightly)" (Sony Music Nashville, 2024)
