= Deus Invictus =

American metal band

- Left to Right: Nicholas Shacklette, John-Michael Dietz, Jay Sexton, Jeff Carter, Brad Wood

Background information
- Origin: Atlanta, Georgia
- Genres: Technical death metal metalcore, progressive metal
- Years active: 2005–present
- Label: Bombworks Records
- Members: Nicholas Shacklette; Jeff Carter; Bradley Wood
- Past members: Jay Sexton; Jeff Watt; Josh Kosko; David Hopper; Damien Chason; Randy Searcy; Matthew Lee; Joseph Calleiro
- Website: Deus Inviticus on Myspace

Deus Invictus is an extreme metal band from Atlanta, Georgia, started in 2005 by former drummer of The Chariot, Jeff Carter. The band's current line-up consists of Nicholas Shacklette ( Guitar/Vocals), Bradley Wood (Bass), and Jeff Carter (Drums/Vocals). The band signed to Bombworks Records, an indie metal label based out of Seattle, Washington, in 2007.

== History ==
After touring and recording with now widely recognized hardcore/metalcore band, The Chariot, drummer Jeff Carter mutually agreed to part ways due to a conflict in stylistic preferences in music. Having been fond of death/progressive metal growing up, it was his concern to start something up in the veins of such bands he admired. He soon got in touch with friend and vocalist David Hopper, in winter of 2005 who was also looking to begin work with such a band. After putting out a call to find others in the greater Atlanta area wanting to play progressive/melodic metal, guitarists Jay Sexton and Damien Chason were introduced into Deus Invictus.

By mid-2005, Deus Invictus began playing shows all around the southeast with such bands as Mychildren Mybride, With Blood Comes Cleansing, With Faith or Flames, and Drag the Waters to name a few. It was not long that the momentum which had built up was nearly shattered by a series of critical lineup changes, which coincidentally, changed both the scope and professionalism of the band.

It was then that guitarist Damien Chason parted ways with the band on good terms. Bassist Matthew Lee was also replaced with Illinois native, Jeff Watt. Soon to follow Jeff Watt into the band was guitarist Nich Shacklette, a Louisville, Kentucky native. With these changes, Deus Invictus strived more on writing new material while still playing many shows in order to maintain their strong support in Georgia, as well as the Southeast. Following several months of writing and playing these shows, Deus Invictus would be parting ways with Jeff Watt, who in turn, was replaced by Randy Searcy. Following the entrance of Randy into the group, founding member David Hopper stepped down from being the vocalist for the band, and members coped by becoming proficient at handling vocal responsibilities whilst playing their instruments in a live setting.

As the band was now a four-piece, the musical prevalence shifted from old school death metal to playing with a tech death/grind edge. Shows were performed alongside such bands as All Shall Perish, The Faceless, Arsis, and many other well-known acts. Due to the member changes and shift in musical direction, the band would then only play shows in and around the Atlanta region. Sensing the need for a dedicated vocalist so as to relieve the instrumentalists of the band to focus solely on musicality, the band brought a well-auditioned Joseph Calleiro in as a permanent vocalist in early 2007. For several months, this lineup played shows and even recorded and published a track for Bombworks Records' "Cornerstone 2007 Sampler", which included acts A Hill to Die Upon, Dagon, and Common Yet Forbidden. After this, bassist Searcy played a few last shows with Deus Invictus, but also ran into conflicts that couldn't be resolved unless ways were parted with the band.

Deus Invictus began working with Bombworks Records on joining their artist roster by late 2008. An unreleased demo for the future track "Rain of God" was released on the Cornerstone Sampler in preparation to the band joining the label at Cornerstone at their own mini-festival, "Day of Metal". After playing Cornerstone Festival on a few different stages and with great crowd response, the band signed on with Bombworks and began finalizing material for their first full-length release. Joseph then parted ways with Deus Invictus, and the group continued to write material for their debut album. At that time, Deus Invictus were prepared to enter the studio as a three-piece until receiving a phone call from bassist Brad Wood, who would serve to complete the band's bassist role from 2008, onward.

Jeff Carter and Nich Shacklette decided it would be best to take a full year off to properly write the album, and by January 2009, Deus Invictus were confirmed to record with locally renowned engineer Charles Clifton of Redroom 104 studios, best known for producing and recording local, yet well known acts such as The Glass Ocean. Clifton would bring a fresh view of the band's former production/style, and would attempt to capture a sound both raw, yet laser-sharp; focusing the barrage of sonic diversity that Deus Invictus sought to bring forth on their first major effort. It is notable that members of the band were also juggling full-time work, which played into the fact that "Staged in Awaiting" encountered many obstacles for the bandmates to jump through as far as time constraints were concerned.

After initial completion of engineering, it was then decided by the band to send the unfinished recording down for mixing/mastering by well-known death metal frontman Erik Rutan's (Hate Eternal/Morbid Angel) Mana Recording Studios, located in St. Petersburg, FL. The album was officially finished/released in September 2010 worldwide to many positive reviews, being made available on many popular online merchant websites including Nuclear Blast America, Relapse Records Online, CDBaby, iTunes, and the like. Many people made comment on Deus Invictus' somewhat "newer" and more "cohesive" sound together, and as a band abroad in the progressive death metal genre. Most notable on the many international music reviews of "Staged in Awaiting" was that critics were at first, both shocked and confused by its musical arrangements stylistically. It was cited by many that the genre-crossing performance on the album were both jarring, yet strangely cohesive; both blindingly chaotic, yet retaining a nearly symphonic edge of cacophony amongst instruments and vocals. With 4 vocalists performing their renditions across all tracks, and mainly at a moment's notice, this new invention of progressive-metal-bent-death seemed to be classified all its own.

Deus Invictus played two shows following the release of Staged in Awaiting internationally. It was after said shows that a founding member, Jay Sexton, decided to part ways with the band. After more than a year further into writing the next album, with personal lives beckoning attention into what would normally be reserved for playing shows and touring, the band, as it were, decided to take a hiatus.

Carter began putting together a record for his solo project, entitled Darkening, which would realize Jeff's full creative potential as a composer, producer and engineer. On this album, indefinitely titled Augur, Jeff sought Mike "Prophet" Brookes, known from the Florida-based band Monotheist to track two songs on guitar. Additionally sought was guitarist and Deus Invictus bandmate Nich Shacklette, who would assist to track six of the remaining songs Carter had written for guitars on "Augur".

Augur was released on July 7, 2015.

Also in 2015…..the hiatus is over….and Deus Invictus is returning.

== Members ==
Current

- Nicholas Shacklette - guitar, vocals (2006–present)
- Jeff Carter - drums, vocals (2005–present)
- Bradley Wood - bass (2008–present)

Former

- David Hopper (vocals; 2005–2006)
- Jay Sexton (guitar/vocals; 2005–2012)
- Matthew Lee (bass; 2005–2006)
- Josh Kosko (bass; 2005)
- Damien Chason (guitar; 2005–2006)
- Jeff Watt (bass; 2006–2007)
- Randall Searcy (bass; 2007–2008)
- Joseph Calleiro (vocals; 2007–2008)

Timeline

== Discography ==
- 2007: Cornerstone 2007 Day of Metal Sampler (Bombworks Records)
- 2007: Gehenna Demo/4 songs
- 2010: Staged in Awaiting (Bombworks Records)
