= Cruel to Be Young =

Studio album by Jonezetta
- Released: September 16, 2008
- Genre: Indie
- Label: Tooth & Nail Records

Jonezetta chronology
Popularity (2006)	Cruel to Be Young (2008)

Professional ratings
Review scores
Source	Rating
Christian Music Zine	(not rated)
IVM	(9/10)
Jesus Freak Hideout	3.5/5 stars

Cruel to Be Young is indie band Jonezetta's second full-length album, which was released on September 16, 2008 through Tooth & Nail Records.

== Track listing ==
1. "Wide Awake"
2. "Holding Onto You"
3. "Busy Body"
4. "Paint & Picture"
5. "Sick In the Teeth"
6. "Cruel to Be Young"
7. "Fur Coat (Roaming Like Animals)"
8. "Valentine"
9. "Untitled"
10. "The Queen City Song"
11. "I Watched You, Out From Your Window"
