= A New Day (Four Letter Lie album) =

Studio album by Four Letter Lie
- Released: October 13, 2009
- Genres: Post-hardcore, metalcore
- Length: 32:15
- Label: Victory
- Producer: Matt Goldman

Four Letter Lie chronology
What a Terrible Thing to Say (2008)	A New Day (2009)

Professional ratings
Review scores
Source	Rating
Rock on Request	(favorable)

A New Day is the third full-length album from the post-hardcore band Four Letter Lie. It was released on October 13, 2009, through Victory with producer Matt Goldman. Timothy Java recorded all of the drum tracks on A New Day due to the departure of Derek Smith, the band's former drummer.

Compared to the band's previous material, this album has a more aggressive sound, although the band did not abandon their post-hardcore roots. With the exception of "My Surrender", none of the tracks show an instance of clean vocals.

== Track listing ==
All tracks are written by Four Letter Lie.

No.	Title	Length
1.	"Daymaker"	2:41
2.	"We're All Sinners"	2:56
3.	"Careless Lover"	2:44
4.	"It's Finally Over"	3:01
5.	"My Surrender" (featuring Jesse Barrera)	3:51
6.	"The Spell"	3:27
7.	"Strugglers"	2:43
8.	"Key to the World"	3:36
9.	"I'm Done Trying to Make It"	2:49
10.	"Young Hearts"	3:13
11.	"Faces in Places"	3:54

== Personnel ==
- Brian Nagan – lead vocals
- Connor Kelly – lead guitar
- John Waltmann – rhythm guitar
- Louis Hammel – bass
- Tai Wright – drums, percussion

Additional musicians

- Jesse Barrera - clean vocals on track 5
