= Wars and Rumors of Wars =

Studio album by The Chariot
- Released: May 5, 2009
- Recorded: January 18 – February 25, 2009
- Genre: Metalcore, mathcore
- Length: 30:18
- Label: Solid State
- Producer: Matt Goldman

The Chariot chronology
The Fiancée (2007)	Wars and Rumors of Wars (2009)	Long Live (2010)

Professional ratings
Review scores
Source	Rating
AbsolutePunk.net	80%
AllMusic	4/5 stars
Alternative Press	4/5 stars
Christianity Today	4/5 stars
Cross Rhythms	7/10 stars
Jesus Freak Hideout	3/5 stars
Rock Sound	9/10 stars

Wars and Rumors of Wars is the third full-length album from the band The Chariot. The album is unique in that, the first 25,000 CD cases were hand stamped, signed and numbered by the band, every member stamping 5,000 each. Similarly, the first 300 were stamped in red ink for a special pre-order. They have stated this was done because they felt that CDs were becoming too impersonal, meaning that bands did not have much to do with a CD after the recording was finished, as the artwork would be designed by someone else, and then the whole package would be sent to the printer. The album is the only release by the band to feature guitarists Dan Vokey and Brian Russell Taylor.

== Track listing ==
All lyrics written by Josh Scogin and composed by The Chariot

No.	Title	Length
1.	"Teach:"	2:53
2.	"Evolve:"	2:59
3.	"Need:"	1:55
4.	"Impress."	2:12
5.	"Never I"	3:28
6.	"Giveth"	3:29
7.	"Abandon."	3:01
8.	"Daggers"	3:43
9.	"Oversea"	0:44
10.	"Mrs. Montgomery Alabama III."	6:00

== Personnel ==
The Chariot

- Josh Scogin - vocals
- Dan Vokey - guitar
- Bryan Russell Taylor - guitar
- Jon "KC Wolf" Kindler - bass
- David Kennedy – drums

Additional Instrumentation

- Jeff Gingrich - Cello ("Never I")

== Trivia ==
- There is a hidden message in the song titles. If you take the first and last letter of each song title and lay them out, it spells "The end is nigh and so am I".
