= Dinner and a Suit =

American rock band

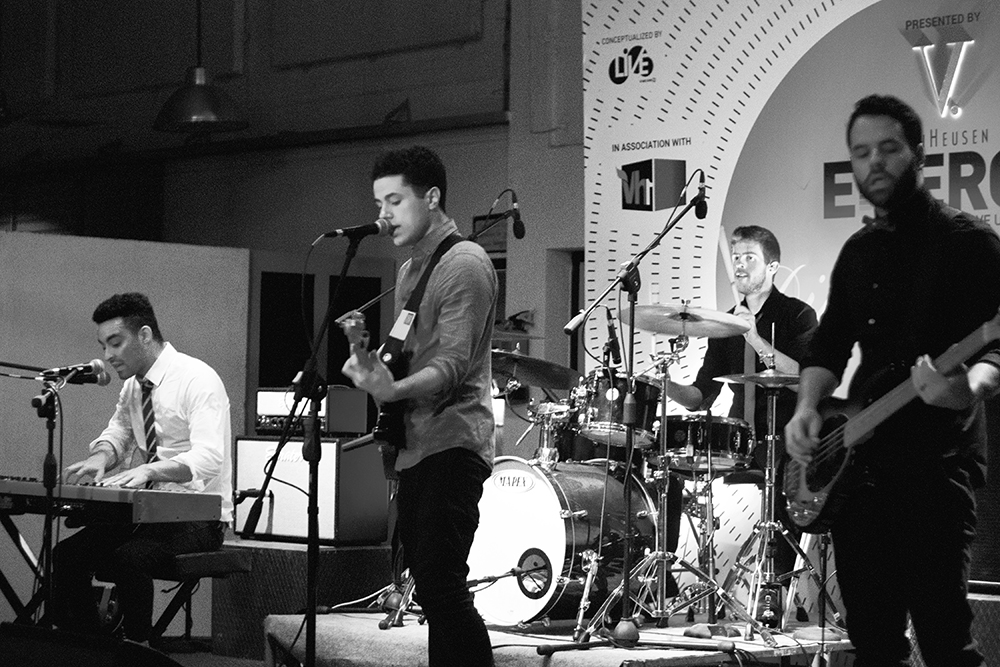
- Dinner and a Suit performing at CounterCulture, Bangalore in November 2013

Background information
- Origin: Moorestown, New Jersey, U.S.
- Genres: Pop rock, alternative rock, indie rock
- Years active: 2008–2016
- Members: Jonathan Capeci; Joey Beretta; Anthony Genca; Drew Scheuer
- Website: dinnerandasuit.com

Dinner and a Suit was an American rock band based in Nashville, Tennessee, formed in 2008. The band was composed of cousins Jonathan Capeci (vocals/guitar) and Joey Beretta (guitar/vocals), long time friend Anthony Genca (bass), and Drew Scheuer (drums). The band's second album Since Our Departure was released in 2012. The band's STAY EP was released on October 7, 2014.

== History ==
=== Formation and early work (2008–2011) ===
Dinner and a Suit was formed in Moorestown, New Jersey, when cousins Jonathan Capeci and Joey Beretta began writing music together. Along with recruiting their long time friend Anthony Genca to play bass, the band built a full line-up playing with various drummers in their first year. In 2008, their first album Light and Lungs was released.

The band's name is a tribute to Joey and Jonathan's great-grandmother. As Jonathan tells it:

"Joey and I are cousins and our great-grandmother was a seamstress who made and repaired clothes during the early part of the 20th century. When the factory that employed her would discard suits, she would take them home and spend her free time mending them. It was the Great Depression and times were tough for everyone. Wanting to make a difference in her own way, she made it a common practice to invite people who were down on their luck over to the house, cook for them and just spend time with them. When they left, she would give them one of the suits she was finished working on. Our family would tell us that they left her home with "dinner and a suit" – and hence the name."

In 2009, Dinner and a Suit was selected as a finalist for the Ernie Ball Battle Of The Bands following a string of dates on the Vans Warped Tour. That same year, they released the follow-up EP Safe To Say.

In 2010, Jonathan, Joey and Anthony moved to Nashville and began working on a new full-length album. Pre-production took place at First Street Studios in Cleveland, TN with producer Tyler Orr. The band then traveled to Glow In The Dark studios in Atlanta, GA to track the album with producer Matt Goldman.

In August 2011, Dinner And A Suit announced that their new album would be titled Since Our Departure. That fall, the band joined Farewell Fighter and Assemble The Skyline for the 'East Coast Beast Coast Tour' from October 14 to November 19, 2011.

=== Since Our Departure (2012–2013) ===
In January 2012, Dinner and a Suit joined Gardening, Not Architecture for a month of tour dates along the east coast and midwest.

In March 2012, the band announced the first single from Since Our Departure would be "Too Late." The song was released digitally on April 10, 2012. That week the music video for "Too Late" debuted as a Freshman Five nominee at mtvU. On April 13, 2012, the video for "Too Late" became a Freshman Pick for the week and moved into regular rotation at mtvU.

Since Our Departure was released on June 12, 2012. Dinner and a Suit played a number of shows the week of release, including a performance at The Roxy in Los Angeles as well as a showcase appearance at the New Music Seminar in New York City.

In October 2012, the band played a sold-out hometown show in Nashville alongside Imagine Dragons at the Cannery Ballroom. On October 19, 2012, Dinner and a Suit's song, "Where We Started", debuted at #73 on the iTunes Top 100 Pop Songs Chart.

On December 21, 2012, Dinner and a Suit announced their first tour for 2013 with The Rocketboys and Mike Mains and The Branches, launching February 15 in Kansas City, MO.

In January 2013, MTV Buzzworthy featured the band, calling them their "latest pop/rock obsession."

On April 3, 2013, the band joined The Parlotones for their Shake It Up US Tour for more than 30 dates through May 7, 2013. On June 19, 2013, the band performed as part of the O Music Awards from CMT Studios in Nashville, Tennessee.

Dinner and a Suit joined Lawson for their "Everywhere We Go" US tour in August 2013.

=== STAY EP (2014) ===
On September 2, 2014, Dinner and a Suit released "Can't Get Enough", the first single from their EP STAY, that was released on October 7, 2014.

=== Disbanding ===
As of late 2015/early 2016, Dinner and a Suit has disbanded, with members Joey Beretta and Jonathan Capeci moving on with a new project called Nightly, which signed with BMG in 2020.
