= One Wing =

Studio album by The Chariot
- Released: August 28, 2012
- Recorded: May 2012, @ Glow In The Dark Studios, Atlanta, Georgia
- Genre: Metalcore, mathcore
- Length: 30:39
- Label: Good Fight; E1
- Producer: Matt Goldman

The Chariot chronology
Long Live (2010)	One Wing (2012)

One Wing is the fifth and final studio album by the American metalcore band The Chariot. The album was released on August 28, 2012, through Good Fight Entertainment and E1 Music. One Wing has been described by the band as being their "weirdest" release to date. The album debuted at number 85 on the Billboard 200, their highest position so far.

== Writing and recording ==
One Wing was recorded with Matt Goldman—who has produced all of The Chariot's albums to date—at his studio in Atlanta, Georgia. Vocalist Josh Scogin said his friendship with Goldman and Goldman's long-standing history with the band factored into their decision to work with him again. Scogin also said, "The producer should be there to help us with our ideas, so with Goldman, he always has good ideas but is also always totally down with us doing weird, goofy stuff that may or may not be a good idea." The recording process began in May 2012, and the group attempted to get Smashing Pumpkins frontman Billy Corgan to participate to some degree by sending him a message over Twitter, although Corgan did not end up participating. The Chariot scheduled time to record One Wing for three weeks, followed by one week of mixing. Scogin said this is the ideal amount of time to record as too much time causes the band to over-think things, but too little time will cause the band to "start to agree to anything."

One Wing marks the first Chariot album not to feature longtime bassist Jon Kindler since The Fiancee in 2007. The bass on the album is performed by both guitarists, Stephen Harrison and Brandon Henderson. The band continued on as a four-piece; their live performance set-up involved the six-string guitarists utilizing bass amps and octave pedals in addition to their regular equipment.

== Release ==
One Wing was co-released in the US on August 28, 2012, through Good Fight Entertainment, who previously released The Chariot's last album Long Live in 2010, and major label E1 Music. The Chariot also signed a deal with Season of Mist to distribute the album throughout Europe on September 21, 2012.

The song "In" was available for online streaming on August 16, 2012.

== Reception ==
Professional ratings
Aggregate scores
Source	Rating
Metacritic	94/100
Review scores
Source	Rating
AbsolutePunk	8.5/10
AllMusic	4/5 stars
Rock Sound	9/10

One Wing was highly praised upon release; it received a Metacritic score of 94/100 across 6 reviews, signifying "universal acclaim". Reviewers cited the rawness, aggression, and experimentation as the album's key strengths.

== Track listing ==
No.	Title	Length
1.	"Forget"	2:20
2.	"Not" (featuring Bryan Taylor)	2:54
3.	"Your" (featuring Angela Plake)	1:08
4.	"First"	3:43
5.	"Love."	3:23
6.	"Speak" (featuring Travis Sadler)	2:11
7.	"In"	2:13
8.	"Tongues"	4:25
9.	"And"	2:34
10.	"Cheek."	5:48

== Personnel ==
The Chariot

- Josh Scogin - vocals
- Brandon Henderson - lead guitar, bass
- Stephen Harrison - rhythm guitar, bass
- David Kennedy - drums, percussion

Additional personnel

- Matt Goldman - producing, engineering, mixing, keyboards
- Trey Moseley - artwork
- Alan Douches - mastering
- Karl Libatore - trumpet (track 4)
- Angela Plake - vocals (track 3)
- Travis Sadler - piano (track 6)
- Bryan Taylor - vocals (track 2)
