= Nightly (band) =

American pop band

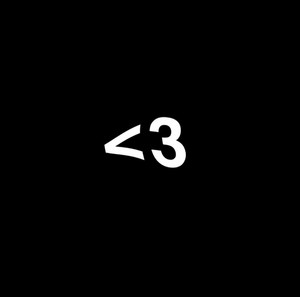
- Logo used by Nightly

Background information
- Origin: Nashville, Tennessee
- Genres: Indie rock; electro-pop; pop rock
- Years active: 2016-present
- Label: independent
- Spinoff of: Dinner And A Suit
- Members: Jonathan Capeci; Joey Beretta; Nicholas Sainato
- Website: https://www.nightloveyou.com/

Nightly is an alternative pop band from Nashville, Tennessee, consisting of Jonathan Capeci, Joey Beretta, and Nicholas Sainato. Capeci and Beretta are formerly of Dinner And A Suit. The band is currently independent and managed by Neon Coast.

== History ==
Cousins Jonathan Capeci and Joey Beretta grew up together around Philadelphia, Pennsylvania. Throughout their childhood and teenage years, they played in a number of bands together, but as they reached college, they dropped out and relocated to Nashville to pursue their project at the time, Dinner And A Suit. As that project dissolved, Capeci and Beretta regrouped with their friends, engineer Stephen Cunsolo and drummer Nicholas Sainato, to form Nightly. The project lacked momentum until they signed with Interscope Records in July 2016 and began work on their debut EP.

After the release of the leading single, "XO" on May 10, Nightly's first EP, titled Honest, was released on October 21, 2016. The EP contained 4 songs, with "XO" being the most successful. Spotify featured "XO" on multiple playlists throughout the Summer, which skyrocketed it to over 2 million plays in a matter of weeks. Following the success of "XO, "Talk To Me" was the next promoted single from the EP.

On March 6, 2017, Nightly released their first music video for the track "XO" off of their debut EP. They collaborated on the video with Tobias Nathan and Jake Saner. Capeci said that they picked Nathan specifically for the video due to his grasp on color. They worked with Nathan again on their music video for "Talk To Me", which released on Youtube on June 27, 2017.

The band toured extensively throughout the end of 2016 and beginning of 2017, opening for acts like Kesha, The All-American Rejects, Zella Day, and K.Flay. After being featured at the We Found New Music showcase at SXSW, they embarked on their first headline tour in April 2017, with support from Saint Mesa, the project of singer and songwriter Danny McCook. They finished out their year of touring with bands such as Urban Cone, The Struts, and The Night Game, while also playing at Bonnaroo for the first time.

On January 22, 2018, Nightly was announced as support for NF on his USA tour. They performed on 28 dates of this tour. While on tour, Nightly released their single "Miss You Like Hell" on February 16. Soon followed up by their single "Holding On", released on March 22.

In August 2019, the band announced that they had signed a new record deal with BMG. In the notes app screenshots they shared on social media, they also explained how challenging the past year was and that they needed to postpone their upcoming tour.

Nightly released their debut album, Night, Love You, on October 16, 2020.

On March 7, 2025, the band released their third album, songs to drive to.

== Discography ==
Nightly discography
- Studio albums: 6
- EPs: 4
- Singles: 35

=== Studio albums ===
List of studio albums, with release date and label shown
Title	Details
Night, Love You	Released: October 16, 2020; Label: BMG; Track listing: 1. "The Car"; 2. "You Should Probably Just Hang Up"; 3. "How It Feels"; 4. "Not Like You"; 5. "Mess In My Head"; 6. "Time Online"; 7. "Whiskey"; 8. "Summer"; 9. "Older"; 10. "Turnpike"; 11. "So Sly"; 12. "Lose a Friend"; 13. "The Movies"; 14. "I Got So Much to Tell You"
Wear Your Heart Out	Released: August 25, 2023; Label: BMG; Track listing: 1. "Wear Your Heart Out"; 2. "The Feeling"; 3. "Like I Do"; 4. "Radiohead"; 5. "It's Not Your Body"; 6. "Shirt"; 7. "Navy Blue"; 8. "My Boys"; 9. "Whiskey, Pt. 2"; 10. "Dry Eyes"; 11. "Naked"; 12. "Pink Starburst"; 13. "Love Somebody"; 14. "Love Somebody (Reprise)"
Songs to Drive To	Released: March 7, 2025; Label: BMG; Track listing: 1. "TV Shows"; 2. "Where Do We Go from Here"; 3. "Stop"; 4. "Mess"; 5. "Gas Station Cowboy Hats"; 6. "Time Flies When You're Having Fun"; 7. "Don't Even Think About It"; 8. "Talk"; 9. "Me and My Misses"; 10. "Every Part"; 11. "I Didn't Know That I Needed You"
The Void	Released: October 31, 2025; Label: BMG; Track listing: 1. "The Shivers"; 2. "Haunted House"; 3. "One More Time"; 4. "Wanted"; 5. "Does It Feel Like Falling"; 6. "1989"; 7. "Look Like That"; 8. "Werewolf"; 9. "Are You Downtown Tonight?"
Baseball In America	Released: August 21, 2026; Label: BMG; Track listing: 1. "The King Of Broadway"; 2. "American Baby"; 3. "Blue Jeans"; 4. "Bar Closing Song"; 5. "Greyhound Station"; 6. "Ballerina"; 7. "Rodeo Queen"; 8. "Angel In The Outfield"
The Void Part 2	Released: October 16, 2026; Label: BMG; Track listing: 1. "Are You Downtown Tonight?"; 2. "Look Like That"; 3. "1989"; 4. "Does It Feel Like Falling"; 5. "Wanted"; 6. "One More Time"; 7. "Haunted House"; 8. "The Shivers"; 9. "Werewolf"; 10. "Bad Dreams"; 11. "Goosebumps" (feat. Taylor Lautner); 12. "Flip Phones and Video Stores"; 13. "SOS"; 14. "Tightrope Walker"; 15. "Overdrive"; 16. "Plastic Fangs"; 17. "1989" (feat. The Midnight)

=== Extended plays ===
List of extended plays, with release date and label shown
Title	Details
Honest	Released: October 21, 2016; Label: Interscope Records; Track listing: 1. "XO"; 2. "Talk to Me"; 3. "Honest"; 4. "No Vacancy"
The Sound of Your Voice	Released: November 9, 2018; Label: Interscope Records; Track listing: 1. "Phantom"; 2. "Miss You Like Hell"; 3. "Holding On"; 4. "Who Am I to You"; 5. "S.T.A.Y."; 6. "Younger"
Talk You Down	Released: June 14, 2019; Label: Interscope Records; Track listing: 1. "Say Anything Else"; 2. "Twenty Something"; 3. "No Call, No Reply"; 4. "Black Coffee"
Night, Love You (Alt EP)	Released: January 29, 2021; Label: BMG; Track listing: 1. "Not Like You (Stripped)"; 2. "So Sly (Alternate Version)"; 3. "Summer (Acoustic)"; 4. "Older (Live Acoustic)"

=== Singles ===
==== As lead artist ====
List of singles as lead artist, showing year released and album name
Title	Year	Album
"XO"	2016	Honest
"Miss You Like Hell"	2018	The Sound of Your Voice
"Holding On"	2018	The Sound of Your Voice
"This Time Last Year"	2019	Non-album singles
"The Movies" (featuring Charli Adams)	2020	Non-album singles
"You Should Probably Just Hang Up"	2020	Night, Love You
"Lover/Loner"	2021	Non-album singles
"A Million Pretty Pieces"	2021	Non-album singles
"Lose My Number"	2021	Non-album singles
"Hate My Favorite Band"	2022	Non-album singles
"On Your Sleeve"	2022	Non-album singles
"Dirty White Chucks"	2022	Non-album singles
"I Wish You Loved Me"	2022	Non-album singles
"Radiohead"	2023	Wear Your Heart Out
"Dry Eyes"	2023	Wear Your Heart Out
"Wear Your Heart Out"	2023	Wear Your Heart Out
"Damn, I Miss You" (with Mokita)	2023	Non-album singles
"Iris"	2023	Non-album singles
"Don't Even Think About It"	2024	Songs to Drive To
"TV Shows"	2024	Songs to Drive To
"Every Part"	2024	Songs to Drive To
"Where Do We Go from Here"	2024	Songs to Drive To
"Gas Station Cowboy Hats"	2024	Songs to Drive To
"I Shouldn't Call You" (with Lindsay Ell)	2025	The Love Myself Collection
"Mess"	2025	Songs to Drive to
"Everything Can Change"	2025	Non-album single
"Werewolf"	2025	The Void
"1989" (featuring Charli Lucas)	2026	Non-album single
"1989" (featuring Fly By Midnight)	2026	Non-album single
"Blue Jeans"	2026	Baseball In America
"American Baby"	2026	Baseball In America
"Angel In The Outfield"	2026	Baseball In America
"Rodeo Queen"	2026	Baseball In America
"Bad Dreams"	2026	The Void Part 2
"1989" (featuring The Midnight)	2026	The Void Part 2

==== As featured artist ====
List of singles as featured artist with title, year, and album
Title	Year	Album
"Sleepless Nights" (Ayokay featuring Nightly)	2018	In the Shape of a Dream
"Maybe Could Have Loved" (Charli Adams featuring Nightly)	2021	Bullseye
"Turns Me Bad" (Fickle Friends featuring Nightly)	2021	Weird Years (Season 2)
"About You" (NOTD featuring Nightly)	2022	Noted... EP
"Amnesia" (Ayokay featuring Nightly)	2022	Digital Dreamscape
"Why U Gotta Be Like That" (Vaultboy featuring Nightly)	2022	This Is What I Get
"Miss When You Missed Me" (Knox featuring Nightly)	2023	I'm So Good at Being Alone?
"This Ain't a Breakup" (Georgia Webster featuring Nightly)	2024	Signs
