= What a Terrible Thing to Say =

Studio album by Four Letter Lie
- Released: February 19, 2008
- Studio: Glow in the Dark
- Genre: Post-hardcore
- Length: 41:17
- Label: Victory
- Producer: Matt Goldman

Four Letter Lie chronology
Let Your Body Take Over (2006)	What a Terrible Thing to Say (2008)	A New Day (2009)

Professional ratings
Review scores
Source	Rating
AbsolutePunk.net	63%

What a Terrible Thing to Say is the second full-length album from the post-hardcore band Four Letter Lie.

== Background and production ==
In November 2007, the band performed at Saints & Sinners Festival. Sessions for What a Terrible Thing to Say were held at Glow in the Dark Studios in Atlanta, Georgia. Matt Goldman served as producer, alongside handling recording and mixing. Alan Douches mastered the album at West West Side.

== Release ==
What a Terrible Thing to Say was released on February 19, 2008, through Victory Records. In February and March 2008, the band went on a US tour alongside Silverstein, the Devil Wears Prada, Protest the Hero and A Day to Remember. In October and November, the band supported Pierce the Veil on their headlining US tour. In December, the band went on an East Coast tour with This Is Hell, Evergreen Terrace and Casey Jones. Videos have been released for "Cake Eater" and "Nothing But a Ghost". The album is the group's last record with Kevin Skaff and Derek Smith.

== Track listing ==
All songs written by Kevin Skaff and Derek Smith, all music arranged by Four Letter Lie, all lyrics written by Brian Nagan and Skaff.

No.	Title	Length
1.	"Cake Eater"	3:52
2.	"Nothing but a Ghost"	4:12
3.	"Pretty/Ugly"	4:16
4.	"It's Coming This Way"	3:00
5.	"What a Terrible Thing to Say"	5:14
6.	"Think of Your Favorite Place"	3:50
7.	"A Place Called "Further""	3:54
8.	"Pretend You Never Happened"	4:01
9.	"I Don't Speak to Dead Men"	4:58
10.	"Charlatan"	5:20

== Personnel ==
Personnel per booklet.

Four Letter Lie

- Brian Nagan – unclean vocals
- Kevin Skaff – lead guitar, clean vocals
- Connor Kelly – rhythm guitar
- John Waltmann – bass guitar
- Derek Smith – drums, percussion, additional programming (track 10)

Additional musicians

- Matt Goldman – additional percussion, keyboards, programming
- Jeremy Griffith – programming (track 1)

Production and design

- Matt Goldman – producer, recording, mixing
- Alan Douches – mastering
- Doublej – art direction, layout
- Tony Maldonado – illustrations
- Matt Wysocki – band photography
