= Come Now Sleep =

Studio album by As Cities Burn
- Released: August 14, 2007
- Genres: Indie rock; post-hardcore; emo; post-rock
- Length: 55:24
- Labels: Tooth & Nail, Solid State
- Producer: Matt Goldman

As Cities Burn chronology
Son, I Loved You at Your Darkest (2005)	Come Now Sleep (2007)	Hell or High Water (2009)

Come Now Sleep was the second studio album by Christian indie rock band As Cities Burn, released on August 14, 2007, by Tooth & Nail/Solid State labels. Come Now Sleep was produced by Matt Goldman. The album saw commercial successes and positive critical attention.

== Music and lyrics ==
Blake Soloman of AbsolutePunk said that "As Cities Burn made huge changes to their sound, and most of it works." Cross Rhythms' Christian Cunningham wrote that "Throughout, the introspective, brooding songcraft gives the album a melancholic intensity. Lyrically there are some meaty subjects to chew on, lending the whole proceedings an even weightier air." At CCM Magazine, Dr. Tony Shore stated that "The melodies are much stronger, and the lyrics are so honest and real they can move you on their own. This is not fluff for folks sitting in the pews; these are songs about real life struggles, hope, failures and grace." In addition, Shore noted that "Musically, fans of As Cities Burn's debut will still find plenty of intensity on this heavy record and even a few screams here and there, but the style on most of the tracks has shifted." At Jesus Freak Hideout, Josh Tyler told that "Come Now Sleep is no less intense than its predecessor however, which is a testament to the musical integrity of these guys, considering the decreased number of screams from one album to the next. Come Now Sleep also intensifies the melodic sense that Son, I Loved You at Your Darkest subtly, but surely contained, with choruses that read like anthems to be chanted and repeated over and over again."

== Critical reception ==
Professional ratings
Review scores
Source	Rating
AbsolutePunk	72%
CCM Magazine	3.5/5 stars
Cross Rhythms	8/10 stars
Jesus Freak Hideout	4.5/5 stars

Come Now Sleep garnered generally positive reception by music critics to critique the album. At AbsolutePunk, Blake Soloman felt that "Come Now Sleep confronts the listener with claims both believable and impossible." Christian Cunningham at Cross Rhythms evoked that the release was "Intense, complicated and challenging; As Cities Burn made the right decision about carrying on." At CCM Magazine, Dr. Tony Shore told that this album was "so much better than the bands debut", which this release was "Heavy, yet melodic and artful, Come Now Sleep won't let you rest for very long." Josh Taylor of Jesus Freak Hideout affirmed that the album was "different, but it's lush, unpredictable, and ultimately beautiful."

== Commercial performance ==
For the Billboard charting week of September 1, 2007, Come Now Sleep was the No. 135 most sold album in the entirety of the United States by the Billboard 200 and it was the No. 5 Top Christian Album as well.

== Track listing ==
All tracks are written by As Cities Burn.

Come Now Sleep
No.	Title	Length
1.	"Contact"	6:51
2.	"Empire"	3:27
3.	"The Hoard"	3:54
4.	"This Is It, This Is It"	3:40
5.	"Clouds"	5:21
6.	"New Sun"	4:34
7.	"Tides"	3:05
8.	"Wrong Body"	5:47
9.	"Our World Is Grey"	5:57
10.	"Timothy"	12:48
Total length:		55:24

== Personnel ==
- Colin Kimble - bass
- Cody Bonnette - guitar, vocals
- Christopher Lott - guitar
- Aaron Lunsford - drums
- Pelle Henricsson – mixing
- Eskil Lovestrom – mixing
- Pelle Henricsson – mastering
- Matt Goldman – production, engineering
- Jordan Butcher – art direction, design, photos
- Elizabeth Noble – cover painting
- Chad Johnson – A&R

== Charts ==
Chart (2007)	Peak position
US Billboard 200	135
US Top Christian Albums (Billboard)	5
