= Let Your Body Take Over =

Studio album by Four Letter Lie
- Released: October 31, 2006
- Recorded: June 2006
- Studio: Applehead Recording
- Genre: Post-hardcore; alternative rock; pop-punk
- Length: 40:21
- Label: Victory
- Producer: Michael Birnbaum, Chris Bittner

Four Letter Lie chronology
This Scarecrow Needs a Flame (2005)	Let Your Body Take Over (2006)	What a Terrible Thing to Say (2008)

Professional ratings
Review scores
Source	Rating
AbsolutePunk	83%
AllMusic	2.5/5 stars
Punknews.org	2/5 stars

Let Your Body Take Over is the full-length debut album from the post-hardcore band Four Letter Lie.

== Background and production ==
On February 11, 2006, Four Letter Lie signed to Victory Records; until April 2006, they played various across the country with a variety of bands. In May 2006, they went on a US tour with Glory of This. Let Your Body Take Over was recorded at Applehead Recording in Woodstock, New York in June 2006. Michael Birnbaum and Chris Bittner both produced, recorded and mixed the album. Michael Fossenkemper mastered it at Turtletone.

== Release ==
On September 29, 2006, "Feel Like Flame" was posted on the band's Myspace profile; a music video appeared in early October 2006. "Naked Girl Avalanche" was posted on their Myspace on October 14, 2006; Let Your Body Take Over was released on October 31, 2006. In January and February 2007, the band supported Roses Are Red on their tour of the U.S.

== Track listing ==
All songs written by Four Letter Lie, all lyrics written by Brian Nagan and Kevin Skaff.

No.	Title	Length
1.	"Diary of a Scientist"	0:37
2.	"Full Tilt Boogie"	3:11
3.	"Naked Girl Avalanche"	3:46
4.	"Feel Like Fame"	3:31
5.	"The Ordinary Life"	4:10
6.	"It Was a Business Doing Pleasure"	2:26
7.	"Let Your Body Take Over"	3:46
8.	"Baby, You're My Bad Habit"	3:43
9.	"Firecracker"	3:41
10.	"Tell Me About Everything"	3:50
11.	"Cowboys & Indians (featuring Doug Robinson of The Sleeping)"	3:31
12.	"Rocky Loves Emily"	4:09

== Personnel ==
Personnel per back panel.

Four Letter Lie

- Brian Nagan – unclean vocals
- Kevin Skaff – lead guitar, clean vocals
- Connor Kelly – rhythm guitar
- John Waltmann – bass guitar
- Derek Smith – drums

Additional musicians

- Chris Bittner – additional keyboard, synth
- Doug Robinson – guest vocals (track 11)

Production and design

- Michael Birnbaum – producer, recording, mixing
- Chris Bittner – producer, recording, mixing
- Michael Fossenkemper – mastering
- Colin Strandberg – cover
- Sean Brant – layout
- Tim Harmon – inside photo
