= Popularity (album) =

Studio album by Jonezetta
- Released: October 3, 2006
- Recorded: Flickerlight Studio, Nashville, TN, The Park Studio, Nashville, TN
- Genre: Indie
- Length: 39:00
- Label: Tooth & Nail
- Producer: Steve Wilson

Jonezetta chronology
Four Songs (2005)	Popularity (2006)	Cruel to Be Young (2008)

Professional ratings
Review scores
Source	Rating
AllMusic	4.5/5 stars
Jesus Freak Hideout	4.5/5 stars

Popularity is Jonezetta's debut album, released by Tooth & Nail Records on October 3, 2006.

== Track listing ==
1. "Welcome Home" – 4:02
2. "Get Ready (Hot Machete)" – 3:13
3. "Communicate" – 3:27
4. "Man In a 3k Suit" – 3:30
5. "Backstabber" – 2:25
6. "Popularity" – 3:33
7. "The Love That Carries Me" – 3:42
8. "The City We Live In" – 4:39
9. "Bringin' It Back Tonite...Everybody Start" – 3:12
10. "Burn It Down!" – 3:18
11. "Imagination" – 3:59
