= Four Letter Lie =

American post-hardcore band

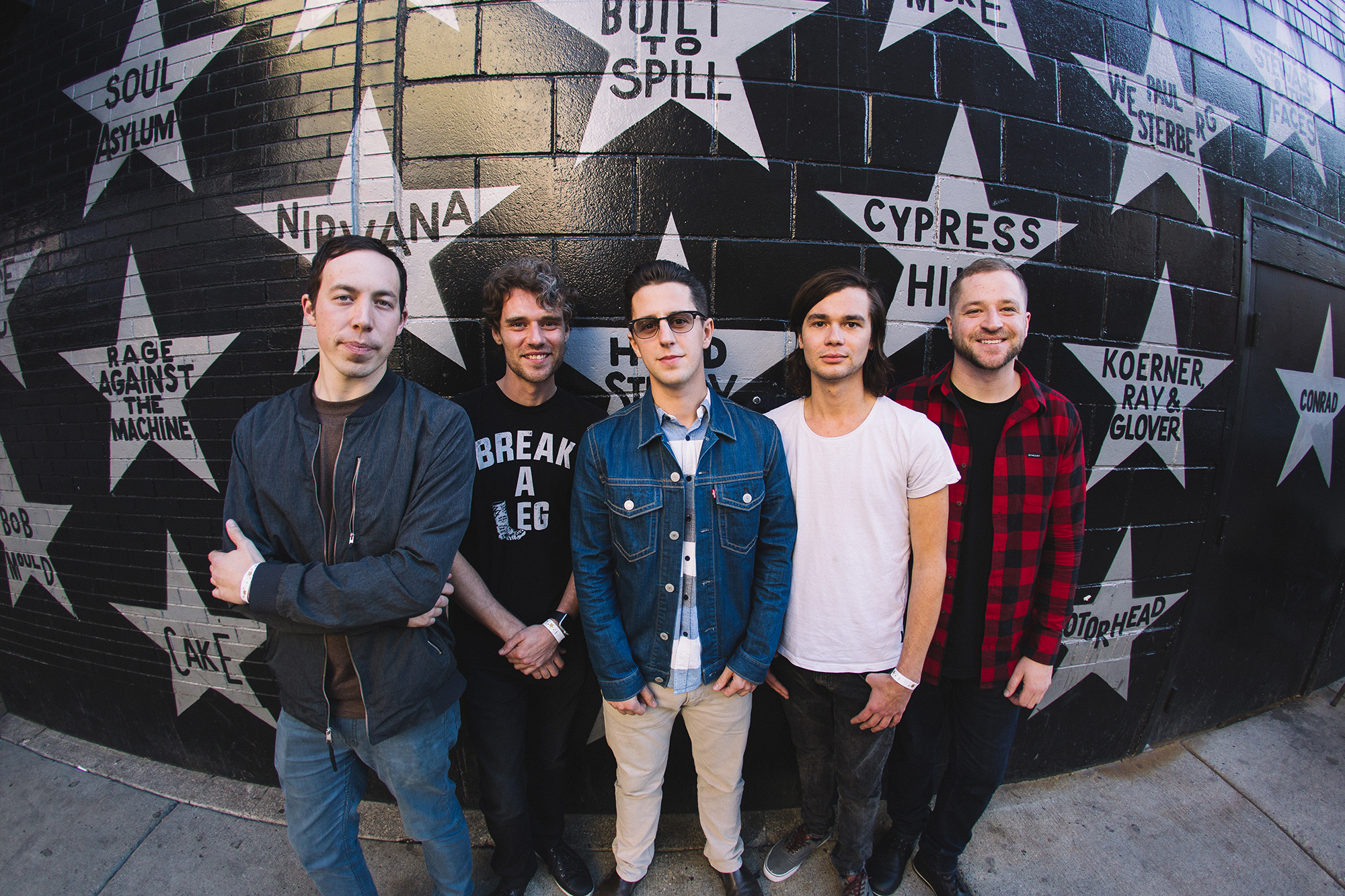

Background information
- Origin: Maple Grove, Minnesota, United States
- Genre: Post-hardcore
- Years active: 2004–2019
- Labels: Victory, Artery Recordings
- Members: Brian Nagan; Connor Kelly; John Waltmann; Timothy Java; Anthony Jones
- Past members: Kevin Skaff; Derek Smith; Louis Hamel; Tai Wright

Four Letter Lie was an American post-hardcore band from Minneapolis, Minnesota.

== History ==
The group formed in 2004 and quickly released an EP entitled Her Escape in May 2005. They followed the release with a heavy tour schedule, which included dates on the Warped Tour and Taste of Chaos tours. The group won an online vote to open the Taste of Chaos date in St. Paul, Minnesota the next year, by which time the group had signed to Victory Records.

The group's first record for Victory, Let Your Body Take Over, appeared in October 2006 and was a regional sales success, although it received mixed reviews from press agencies.

The group continued touring throughout 2007 and has since written a new album, What a Terrible Thing to Say, which was released on February 19, 2008. The album peaked at No. 31 on the Billboard Top Heatseekers chart. In spring 2008, Four Letter Lie toured with A Skylit Drive, Oh, Sleeper, and Memphis May Fire and spent the summer touring with Dance Gavin Dance and A Static Lullaby. They then finished out 2008 with Pierce the Veil, Emarosa and Breathe Carolina.

On March 30, 2009, the band posted a blog on their MySpace, announcing that Kevin had departed from the band and joined A Day to Remember in June. On July 4, 2009, the band announced via MySpace that their drummer, Derek Smith, had left the band to pursue a rap career as a solo artist, MOD SUN, and that John Waltmann would be switching from bass to guitar.

The band's third album, A New Day, was released on October 13, 2009 through Victory Records. They have done several tours in support of the new release, including a full U.S. run with Love Hate Hero, Sleeping With Sirens, and Of Machines. The band also finished a Canadian tour in April with We Came As Romans and continued supporting them through May in the U.S. Their full national USA headlining tour for their 3rd release A New Day took place in June–August 2010.

On May 29, the band announced their signing for the Artery Recordings and the new EP title "Like Structures" was released on August 5, 2014. 'Like Structures' included founding members Brian Nagan, John Waltmann and Connor Kelly, and also introduced Anthony Jones who provided clean vocals for the first time since the departure of Kevin Skaff. The album also brought back drummer Timothy Java who had played with bands as Dead to Fall and Darkest Hour. The band released the first track of the album entitled "Inversion", on June 5, 2014.

== Band members ==
Current

- Brian Nagan – unclean vocals (2004–2019)
- Connor Kelly – lead guitar (2009–2019), rhythm guitar (2004–2009)
- John Waltmann – rhythm guitar (2009–2019), bass (2004–2009)
- Timothy Java – drums, percussion (2012–2019)
- Anthony Jones – bass, clean vocals (2011–2019)

Former

- Kevin Skaff – lead guitar, clean vocals, piano (2004–2009)
- Derek Smith – drums, percussion (2004–2009)
- Louis Hamel – bass, backing vocals (2009–2011)
- Tai Wright – drums, percussion (touring 2009–2011)

== Discography ==
Studio albums

- Let Your Body Take Over (2006)
- What a Terrible Thing to Say (2008)
- A New Day (2009)

Extended plays

- Her Escape (2005)
- This Scarecrow Needs a Flame (2005)
- Like Structures (2014)
