= The Chariot (band) =

American hardcore punk band (2003–2013)

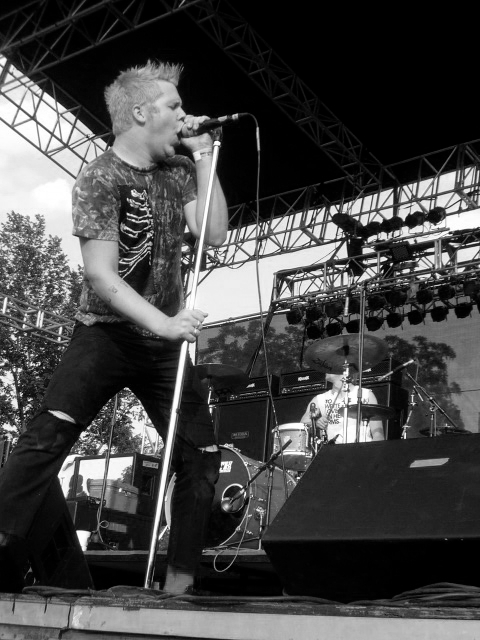
- Vocalist Josh Scogin and drummer Jake Ryan performing at Cornerstone Festival 2006

Background information
- Origin: Douglasville, Georgia, U.S.
- Genres: Hardcore punk; metalcore; mathcore
- Years active: 2003–2013
- Labels: Solid State, Good Fight
- Spinoffs: '68, Fever 333, Queens Club, The Glass Ocean
- Spinoff of: Norma Jean
- Past members: Josh Scogin; David Kennedy; Stephen Harrison; Brandon Henderson; Jon "KC Wolf" Kindler; Gavin King; Bryan Russel Taylor; Dan Vokey; Dan Eaton; Jake Ryan; Joshua Beiser; Keller Harbin; Jeff Carter; Tony Medina; Jon Terrey
- Website: thechariot.com

The Chariot was an American hardcore punk band from Douglasville, Georgia, that existed from 2003 to 2013. The last lineup consisted of drummer David Kennedy, vocalist and bandleader Josh Scogin, and guitarists Brandon Henderson and Stephen Harrison. The band experienced frequent lineup changes since its inception, with Scogin being the only original member. The band played an abrasive style of metalcore that did not adhere to typical stylings popular among their contemporaries such as melodic/abrasive dynamics and harmonic vocals. They built a reputation around their powerful live performances, with Scogin's lyrics covering topics like materialism, personal struggle, current events, politics, and Christian themes.

The band was formed by Scogin shortly after he left his position of vocalist in Norma Jean. In 2004, a record deal was signed with Solid State Records and a debut album was released, titled Everything Is Alive, Everything Is Breathing, Nothing Is Dead, and Nothing Is Bleeding. The band toured constantly after that. The Chariot released the Unsung EP in 2005, which was then followed by three successful studio albums: The Fiancée in 2007, Wars and Rumors of Wars in 2009, and Long Live in 2010. The band entered the studio in May 2012 to record their fifth full-length album titled One Wing which was released August 28, 2012. The Chariot disbanded following a farewell tour in late 2013.

== Biography ==
=== 2003–2004: Formation and debut album ===
The Chariot was formed by Josh Scogin almost immediately after leaving his previous band Norma Jean, a metalcore group based in Douglasville, Georgia. He recorded one album with them titled Bless the Martyr and Kiss the Child in 2002. Later that year, following Norma Jean's set at Furnace Fest, Scogin shocked the audience and his unaware bandmates by announcing his departure. Scogin stated that his departure was not the result of internal conflict, but a personal choice. The event generated a public outcry from fans in hardcore circles. Scogin returned to Douglasville in 2003 and started the Chariot with other musicians in the area; the first lineup included guitarists Keller Harbin and Tony "Taco" Medina, bassist Joshua Beiser, and drummer Jeff Carter. The band's name was inspired by the Biblical story of Elijah and the chariot of fire.

In 2004, a record contract was signed with Solid State Records, a metal subdivision of Tooth & Nail Records and their first recorded song titled "It Is Usually the Boys Who Cry Wolf That Grow up to Be the Men Who Cry Sanctuary" was released on the compilation "This Is Solid State, Volume 5". This song was later re-recorded as "Yellow Dress, Locked Knees" on their debut. The band traveled to Atlanta, Georgia and worked on their debut album with Matt Goldman. The entire album was recorded live. The album was released in November and titled Everything Is Alive, Everything Is Breathing, Nothing Is Dead, and Nothing Is Bleeding, a parody of albums that featured morbid names. The album debuted at No. 23 on Top Heatseekers, and received favorable reviews from critics. Touring followed with As Cities Burn, He Is Legend, Far-less and Showbread on the Young Bloods Tour in Winter.

=== 2005–2008: The Fiancée ===
Medina and Carter left the band soon after; they were replaced by Brian Khounvichit and Mark Nicks respectively. Carter went on to form the progressive death metal band, Deus Invictus. Nicks was later replaced by drummer Jake Ryan. In September 2005, The Chariot began a 27-city tour at Poughkeepsie, New York with High on Fire, Every Time I Die, and The Red Chord. An EP, titled Unsung, was released at the beginning of December. It featured two new tracks and four re-recordings from their debut and was well received among critics. The band played shows with labelmates As Cities Burn, mewithoutYou, and Underoath later that month. Touring continued through 2006 as the band shared a national tour with P.O.D. in spring and garnered a spot in the Sounds of the Underground Tour with As I Lay Dying that summer. In June 2006, Beiser and Harbin stepped down and were replaced by bassist Dan Eaton and guitarist Jon Terry respectively. The two men had been longtime friends of the band.

The Chariot embarked on the Youngbloods II Tour in fall with Solid State labelmates August Burns Red, Destroy The Runner, and Inhale Exhale. In January 2007, the band toured through Europe with Becoming the Archetype, and Shaped by Fate. By this time, yet another bass player had been recruited—Jon "KC Wolf" Kindler. In April of the same year, after delays relating to lineup changes, their second album, The Fiancée, was released. The record was produced by Matt Goldman. The writing and recording process had been driven by time constraints. "It was actually a very easy record to write," said Scogin, "It came more naturally to us." However, Scogin waited until the music was written before writing lyrics, an exercise he vowed never to attempt again. Hayley Williams of Paramore made a guest performance on the track "Then Came To Kill" as did Aaron Weiss of mewithoutYou when he played the harmonica on "Forgive Me Nashville"; Scogin had been friends with both artists for many years. The Fiancée broke the Billboard 200—it debuted at No. 169, selling 6,800 copies— and was well received in the Christian and secular markets. The group played a release tour with Misery Signals, I Am Ghost, and I Hate Sally, and then made a short run on the Warped Tour in summer. Another leg of The Fiancée Tour extended into spring 2008 with LoveHateHero, Alesana, Our Last Night, and Sky Eats Airplane. The lineup underwent another drastic change in mid-2008, as Jake Ryan, Dan Eaton and Jon Terry all decided to step down. Ryan and Eaton went on to form the indie pop band Queens Club and were signed to Tooth & Nail Records.

=== 2009–2010: Wars and Rumors of Wars ===
The group's third album, titled Wars and Rumors of Wars, was released in May 2009. The lineup changed once again, leaving Scogin as the only member to appear on their first two releases. The album title was inspired by Matthew 24:6, which contains the passage "You will be hearing of wars and rumors of wars..." Scogin explained that the album title referred to internal conflict that people experience, not literal war. The band hand-made the artwork and liner notes for the first 25,000 copies of the album. Wars and Rumors of War debuted at No. 112 on the Billboard 200, their highest to date. Critical reception was very positive about the release. The Chariot performed on the Scream the Prayer Tour with Haste the Day, Sleeping Giant, Oh, Sleeper, and Project 86 that summer. Beginning late November, The Chariot and a group of hand picked artists, including Horse the Band supported Norma Jean who headlined the nationwide Explosions 2009 Tour.

=== 2010: Long Live ===
The Chariot released their fourth studio album Long Live through Good Fight on November 22, 2010. The album was produced with Matt Goldman.

=== 2012–2013: One Wing and final tour ===
The band announced via Twitter that they were entering the studio in May to record their next album. The album is called One Wing, and was released August 28, 2012. In June 2012, longtime bassist Jon (KC Wolf) Kindler left the band to return to college. The band opted not to replace Kindler, continuing as a four-piece. The bass on One Wing has been recorded by both Henderson and Harrison. A track from the album, "In," premiered on Alternative Press on August 16.

The Chariot had their final tour in October/November 2013 with Glass Cloud, Rebuker, Birds in Row and To the Wind.

Josh moved on to form the band '68. Stephen Harrison became the guitarist of The Fever 333, a supergroup formed by Jason Aalon Butler two months after the disbanding of his former band letlive. In 2018, David Kennedy joined former The Chariot members, Bryan Taylor and Jon Terrey, forming The Threats.

In 2020, Scogin stated that The Chariot would never reunite in a preplanned way; specifically mentioning that he would rather spontaneously perform with the band members again than plan the event. He also stated that nostalgia needed to remain in the past, rather than always focusing on his prior projects, being present with whatever project he is involved in.

== Musical style and influences ==
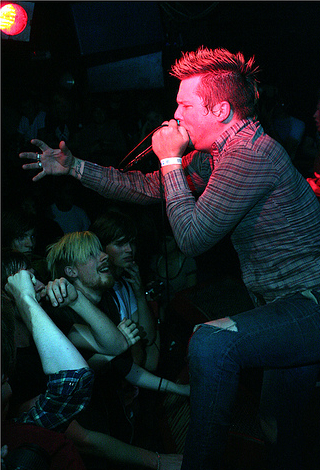
Josh Scogin performing with The Chariot at Camden Underworld, London in 2006.

The band's music is characterized by a metal sound, and the screamed vocals of frontman Josh Scogin. Journalists have frequently referred to the music as "chaotic"; Allmusic writer Alex Henderson described it as a "dense, clobbering sledgehammer", while Brian Shultz of Alternative Press called it "manically pounding, distortion-soaked exercises of catharsis". The Chariot has often been labeled a metalcore band. However, the music generally defies genre standards like melodic/abrasive dynamics and harmonizing vocals; it wouldn't leave room for the "nonstop firestorm of exploding drums, heaving guitars, and visceral shrieking," as Allmusic writer Corey Apar put it. The band utilizes time changes and start-stop shifts, and typically write very short songs. Some journalists believe the music is challenging and an acquired taste.

Live performances are very important to the band. "We love playing live," said Scogin, "That's what this band are all about: playing live shows." This mentality leaked into their recording process: the band's first album was recorded entirely live in one take. Their next two efforts followed more traditional recording sensibilities: "We may go in and [fix] this one part," explained Scogin, "but [...] there's lots of stuff we probably should have tightened up. [Laughs.] But that [keeps] it feeling like a real record." Despite their attentiveness to the recording process, Scogin has maintained that their focal point is live performances, "...recording records, that's all circled around hopefully bringing more kids to the live show so we can perform for them." The band's shows have built up a reputation; MTV called them "the thing of metalcore legend". When tasked to describe their set on the Scream the Prayer Tour in HM Magazine, Corey Erb wrote:

The best word I can find is destruction. There's a frantic mix of bodies flailing, limbs flying, strings bending [..] Scogin threw his microphone twice, the guitarist climbed up on the stack of amps and hung from the rafters twice, and the set ended with the band piling up amps, drums, mic stands, lights and instruments in the middle of the stage and scraping their guitar strings across the edges of the pile. I wouldn't have been surprised if they poured gasoline on the mess and lit it up.

"Daggers"
The eighth track from Wars and Rumors of Wars, "Daggers", contains lyrics about war, a prevalent theme in the album.

Artists who possessed strong showmanship skills have largely influenced Scogin; some of these artists include James Brown, Frank Sinatra, Jerry Lee Lewis, and Elvis Presley. He is also fond of Arcade Fire, The Beatles, Björk, Interpol, and The Killers. In an interview, Scogin expressed a desire to have seen At The Drive-In and Nirvana before they disbanded.

Scogin's introspective lyrics have covered topics like materialism, death, and the Nashville Christian music industry. The lyrics for Wars and Rumors of Wars were formed after a family loss: "...only a year ago my father passed away. And I hate to say this, because it sounds like such a band-dude thing to say, but the lyrics are a lot darker than any other record just because of how personal they are for me." Scogin usually refers to his lyrics as poems and has maintained that "a song is never finished but abandoned." "...as an artist you can forever be changing a song or making a song 'better' or whatever but the moment that you stop recording and send it off to be mastered you have not 'finished' the song…you have only abandoned the song and that is how it will stay forever." His lyrics sometimes espouse Christian themes and beliefs, albeit subtly. For example, the track "Yellow Dress: Locked Knees" from Everything... contains the Spanish lyrics "Jesus, yo quiero que este mundo te conozca."; when translated, it says "Jesus, I want this world to know You." The song "And Shot Each Other" from The Fiancée fades out into a Sacred Harp choir singing the song 'Child of Grace', which features the lyrics "How happy is a child of grace, who feels his sins forgiven / This world, he cries, is not my place / I seek a place in Heaven."

The Chariot is frequently called a Christian band, which Scogin agreed with in a 2005 interview: "We are Christians in a band therefore we are a Christian band. We are not ashamed of our beliefs but we don't force feed people what we believe either." In 2006, he reaffirmed his previous statements and further opined, "When I was growing up, if I liked [a band], I listened to it — and I went to the shows. If I didn't, I didn't. It wasn't like, 'Oh, they don't believe the same thing I do,' [...] People care too much about the fashion of it all. To me, a band's either good or they ain't, and that's the only thing that should matter."

== Members ==
Final Lineup

- Josh Scogin – lead vocals (2003–2013)
- Stephen "Stevis" Harrison – rhythm guitar, backing vocals (2009–2013); bass (2012–2013)
- David Kennedy – drums (2008–2013)
- Brandon Henderson – lead guitar, backing vocals (2011–2013); bass (2012–2013)

Former members

- Keller Harbin – lead guitar, vocals (2003–2006); drums (2003–2004)
- Joshua Beiser – bass (2003–2006)
- Tony Medina – rhythm guitar (2003–2005)
- Jeff Carter – drums (2004–2005)
- Mark Nicks - drums (2005-2006)
- Jake Ryan – drums (2005–2008)
- Dan Eaton – rhythm guitar, backing vocals (2006–2008); bass (2006)
- Jon Terrey – lead guitar, backing vocals (2006–2008, 2010)
- Jon "KC Wolf" Kindler – bass, backing vocals (2006–2012)
- Dan Vokey – rhythm guitar, backing vocals (2008–2009)
- Bryan Russel Taylor – lead guitar (2008–2010)

Timeline

== Discography ==
Studio albums

- 2004: Everything Is Alive, Everything Is Breathing, Nothing Is Dead, and Nothing Is Bleeding
- 2007: The Fiancée
- 2009: Wars and Rumors of Wars
- 2010: Long Live
- 2012: One Wing

EPs

- 2005: Unsung EP

Compilations

- 2011: Before There Was

Singles

- 2011: "Music Of A Grateful Heart"

Demos

- 2004: I Collect Bust
- 2004: Matt Goldman Demo

Appearances

- 2004: "It Is Usually The Boys Who Cry Wolf That Grow Up To Be The Men Who Cry Sanctuary" - This Is Solid State: Volume 5
- 2010: "The Fox And The Wolf" - There Is a Hell Believe Me I've Seen It. There Is a Heaven Let's Keep It a Secret.

== Videography ==
This is the list of The Chariot music videos. Among them are official videoclips and live videos.

Year	Name
2005	The Company, The Comfort, The Grave
2006	Yanni Depp
2007	They Faced Each Other
2007	They Drew Their Swords
2008	Forgive Me Nashville
2009	Daggers
2009	Teach
2010	Evolve
2010	David De La Hoz
2011	The City
2011	The Heavens
2011	Evan Perks
2012	Cheek

== Filmography ==
- 2004: Ladies and Gentlemen... The Chariot
- 2007: One More Song
- 2014: Farewell Documentary
