= Clean Head =

EP by Oceana
- Released: May 11, 2010
- Recorded: 2010, @ Glow in the Dark Studios, Atlanta, Georgia
- Genre: Indie rock
- Label: Rise
- Producer: Matt Goldman

Oceana chronology
Birth.Eater (2009)	Clean Head (2010)	One Big Particular Loop (2013)

Clean Head is Oceana's first EP, and a follow-up to their second release Birth.Eater. The album was written with the intent of being the B-sides to Birth.Eater and covers similar topics. The record focuses primarily around the idea of finding beauty in life through whatever way you see fit. This album shows a vast sound change and maturity of the band as a whole and was very well received by fans and critics. Clean Head will be released as a Hot Topic exclusive, and on various online distribution services. This new EP has a total of four songs. The album was released on May 11, 2010. "Birth.Eater" will also be re-released by Distort Entertainment, with the four new EP tracks. This is also the last release to feature guitarist Jack Burns as well as the last under the "Oceana" name.

== Reception ==
Professional ratings
Review scores
Source	Rating
Lushbeat	4/5 stars
Stuffscenekidslike	5/5 stars
IndieVisionMusic	10/10 stars

Clean Head has been incredibly well received by reviewers and fans alike. Rinse, Review, Repeat put the EP in high regards saying "For only being four songs long, the Clean Head EP stands as its own pillar in Oceana’s ever-changing progression as a band, filling the intimate gap needed to complete the array of soundscapes they’ve released in the past."

== Track listing ==
No.	Title	Length
1.	"Blue"	4:38
2.	"Barracuda Capital of the World"	4:35
3.	"Wool God"	3:24
4.	"Joy"	5:11

== Personnel ==
- Brennan Taulbee – lead vocals, keys, guitar
- Alex Schultz – guitar, vocals
- Jack Burns – guitar
- Kolby Crider – bass
- Denny Agosto – drums
