= Son, I Loved You at Your Darkest =

Studio album by As Cities Burn
- Released: June 21, 2005
- Recorded: 2004–2005
- Studio: Glow in the Dark, Atlanta, Georgia
- Genre: Post-hardcore, screamo
- Length: 36:03
- Label: Solid State
- Producer: Matt Goldman, Josh Scogin, As Cities Burn

As Cities Burn chronology
As Cities Burn EP (2003)	Son, I Loved You at Your Darkest (2005)	Come Now Sleep (2007)

Professional ratings
Review scores
Source	Rating
AllMusic	2.5/5 stars
Jesus Freak Hideout	4.5/5 stars

Son, I Loved You at Your Darkest is the first full-length studio album released in June 2005 by As Cities Burn.

== Allusions ==
The album includes numerous allusions. "Thus from My Lips, by Yours, My Sin Is Purged" is a line from Shakespeare's Romeo and Juliet. Another example includes lyrics such as, "let the dead bury their own dead", from the song "Wake Dead Man, Wake". This is a line originally spoken by Jesus in The Gospel of Luke.

== Track listing ==
No.	Title	Length
1.	"Thus from My Lips, by Yours, My Sin Is Purged"	3:04
2.	"Love Jealous One, Love"	3:04
3.	"Incomplete Is a Leech"	2:54
4.	"Bloodsucker Pt. II"	3:23
5.	"Terrible! How Terrible for the Great City!"	3:00
6.	"The Widow"	3:51
7.	"Wake Dead Man, Wake"	3:10
8.	"Admission: Regret"	3:05
9.	"One: Twentyseven"	3:51
10.	"Of Want and Misery: The Nothing That Kills"	6:41

== Personnel ==
- Colin Kimble - rhythm guitar
- Cody Bonnette - lead guitar, clean vocals, piano
- Pascal Barone - bass
- Aaron Lunsford - drums, percussion
- TJ Bonnette - screamed vocals, programming, piano
- Lap steel on "Incomplete Is a Leech" - Troy Strains
- Piano on "Of Want and Misery: The Nothing That Kills", Crystal Ninja Strings - Matt Goldman
- Additional vocals on "Admission: Regret" - Josh Scogin
- Recording - Matt Goldman
- Mixing - Mike Watts
- Mastering - Troy Glessner
- Engineering - Tyler Orr, Troy Strains, Jeremiah Edwards
- Art - Asterik Studios
