= Unsung (EP) =

EP by The Chariot
- Released: December 6, 2005
- Recorded: 2005
- Studio: Glow in the Dark, Atlanta, Georgia
- Genre: Metalcore, mathcore, hardcore punk
- Length: 16:04
- Label: Solid State
- Producer: Matt Goldman

The Chariot chronology
Everything Is Alive, Everything Is Breathing, Nothing Is Dead, and Nothing Is Bleeding (2004)	Unsung (2005)	The Fiancée (2007)

Professional ratings
Review scores
Source	Rating
Jesus Freak Hideout	link

Unsung is an EP released through Solid State Records on December 6, 2005, by Christian Hardcore/Mathcore group The Chariot. It contains two new songs and four re-worked versions of songs from their debut album Everything Is Alive, Everything Is Breathing, Nothing Is Dead, and Nothing Is Bleeding. The EP also marks the first use of the Chariot's iconic "skull" image on the CD's artwork.

== Track listing ==
1. "Yanni Depp" - 2:41
2. "Phil Cosby (Before There Was Atlanta, There Was Douglasville)" - 2:13
3. "Vin Affleck (Goodnight My Lady And A Forever Farewell)" - 2:43
4. "Kenny Gibler (Play The Piano Like A Disease)" - 4:07
5. "Sargent Savage (Die Interviewer [Germanickly Speaking])" - 1:56
6. "Donnie Cash (The Company, The Comfort, The Grave)" - 2:24

Track #4, "Kenny Gibbler", was re-recorded for "The Fiancée" album. The re-recorded version features Paramore vocalist Hayley Williams accompanying Josh Scogin. The track was re-titled as "Then Came to Kill".

== Credits ==
- Josh Scogin - Vocals
- Jake Ryan - Drums
- Keller "Virtuoso" Harbin - Guitar, vocals, drums, bass, piano, banjo, bagpipe, mandolin, violin, acoustic
- Joshua Beiser - Bass
- Neil Fox - Vocals
- Mike Watts - Mixing
