= Jonezetta =

American rock band

- Origin: Clinton, Mississippi, United States
- Genres: Indie rock, alternative rock
- Years active: 2002—2009
- Label: Tooth & Nail Records (2005-2010)
- Members: Robert Chisolm; Kyle Howe; Ty Garvey; Alex Warren; Tyler Kemp
- Past members: Timothy Jordan II; Mick Parsons; Tony Abercrombie

Jonezetta was an American rock band from Clinton, Mississippi, which released two albums on Tooth and Nail Records in the 2000s.

== History ==
=== Early years and Popularity (2002–2006) ===
Jonezetta formed when its four members were still in high school. The bandmembers "claim to have chosen their meaningless name in homage to bands like Coldplay, by putting together two unrelated words." Keeping the band together as a hobby while the four members focused on their college educations, Jonezetta played occasional gigs on the Southern college circuit, and were considering splitting up in the fall of 2004. However, at a gig in Monroe, LA, with the Christian Post-hardcore rock act As Cities Burn, Jonezetta met that band's manager, Ryan Rado; he encouraged the band to devote themselves more fully to their music. A demo recorded during the bandmembers' 2005 spring break led to the band signing with Tooth & Nail Records, with a distribution deal through EMI. In 2005 Jonezetta released a four song EP, which was also available to download via AbsolutePunk.

In the summer of 2005, former The All-American Rejects and The Elation keyboardist Timothy Jordan II joined the band as their official fifth member; Jordan died by suicide in December 2005, just as the band was beginning to record their debut album with producer Steve Wilson. That debut album, Popularity, was released on Tooth & Nail in October 2006, preceded by the group's first single, "Get Ready (Hot Machete)."

=== Cruel To Be Young (2007–2008) ===
The band acquired keyboardist Tyler Kemp. They also replaced drummer Mick Parsons with Alex Warren in mid 2007. The two toured with Jonezetta for the rest of the year and recorded on Jonezetta's sophomore release "Cruel to be Young", which was released on September 16, 2008.

Flip Choquette of Jesus Freak Hideout states in the review of the album, "The biggest question going into this album though is, just how different is it? To put it simply, don't expect to dance much." The review also states "Despite a departure from the fire that was characteristic of their early work, Jonezetta's Cruel to Be Young is worth a listen. And another listen. And another listen. And at that point it doesn't matter how different the album is; it's Jonezetta." David Bazan from Pedro the Lion and Headphones is a guest vocalist on the song "Sick in the Teeth".

=== Inactivity (2009–present) ===
After the release of Cruel to Be Young, Jonzetta entered a period of inactivity that continues to this day. The group was removed from the "Current Artists" section from the Tooth and Nail Records website in early 2010.

== Band members ==
=== Current ===
- Robert Chisolm - lead vocals, guitar
- Kyle Howe - guitar, backing vocals
- Ty Garvey - bass, backing vocals
- Alex Warren - drums
- Tyler Kemp - keys

=== Former ===
- Mick Parsons - Drums
- Timothy Jordan II (deceased—died during the writing and pre-production of Popularity) - keyboards, guitar, backing vocals
- Tony Abercrombie - keyboards
- Bill Peden - percussion, Life Coach

== Discography ==
=== Albums ===
Title	Release Date	Label	Chart Positions	
Title	Release Date	Label	US Christ.	US Heat.
Popularity	2006	Tooth & Nail Records	26	14
Cruel to Be Young	2008	Tooth & Nail Records	39	—

=== EPs ===
- Not A Real Demo (2004)
- Four Songs (2005)

=== Singles ===
- "Welcome Home"
- "Get Ready (Hot Machete)"
- "Popularity"

=== Videos ===
- "Get Ready (Hot Machete)" (2006)
- "Busy Body" (2008)

== Tours ==
- Tooth and Nail Tour 2006 with Emery, Anberlin, Far-Less, The Fold, The Classic Crime
- Fall 2006 With Mutemath, Shiny Toy Guns, and The Whigs
- 2006 tour with As Cities Burn, Maylene and the Sons of Disaster, and more.
- 2007 Anberlin's Cities tour with Meg & Dia, and Bayside.
- 2007 The Reaping promotion tour with Anberlin.
- 2007 Vans Warped Tour
- 2007 Dance Rawr Dance Tour with Family Force 5 and The Secret Handshake
- 2008 Parachute 2008
- 2008 Meg & Dia Fall Tour
- 2008 Straylight Run Fall Tour
- 2008 Shiny Toy Guns Fall Tour
