= Everything Is Alive, Everything Is Breathing, Nothing Is Dead, and Nothing Is Bleeding =

Studio album by The Chariot
- Released: November 16, 2004
- Genre: Metalcore; mathcore
- Length: 27:53
- Language: English; Spanish
- Label: Solid State
- Producer: Matt Goldman

The Chariot chronology
Goldman Demo 2004 (2004)	Everything Is Alive, Everything Is Breathing, Nothing Is Dead, and Nothing Is Bleeding (2004)	Unsung EP (2005)

Professional ratings
Review scores
Source	Rating
AllMusic	3.5/5 stars
Cross Rhythms	9/10 stars
Jesus Freak Hideout	3.5/5 stars
Music Emissions	4.5/5 stars

Everything Is Alive, Everything Is Breathing, Nothing Is Dead, and Nothing Is Bleeding is the debut studio album by American hardcore punk band The Chariot. It was recorded completely live and overdub-free, and was not mastered, giving the album a raw sound. The CD lyric booklet includes the following statement by the band: "This album was recorded live in a studio setting and no computers were used in the manipulation of our music. Everything that you hear was played by human beings, and was not copy/pasted by computers. That is why it sounds a little raw and unconventional. Technology is a convenience, and it is okay to be used in moderation, but for the sake of the lost authentic sound of rock and roll, we decided to go the route of our forefathers and get it all in one take as best as we could. We believe that sweat and practice should persevere over the convenience of a computer. We believe that although this album may not be one hundred percent tight and perfect in every way (like you are used to) it will be authentic, and therefore understood. At least that is our hope. Thank you for your grace. Thank you for your support. We hope this album brings joy to your heart. -The Chariot"

== Background ==
The Chariot was formed by vocalist Josh Scogin in 2003. Scogin was formerly the vocalist for Norma Jean, recording one album with them. During the band's performance at the 2002 Furnace Fest, Scogin announced that he would be departing Norma Jean. Scogin stated his departure was not due to any internal conflicts, but a personal choice. Shortly after he departed from Norma Jean, Scogin formed the Chariot with other musicians in the Douglasville, Georgia area; the band's name was inspired by the Biblical story of Elijah and the chariot of fire.

The band was signed to Solid State Records, a metal subdivision of Tooth & Nail Records, in 2004. The band's first song, "It Is Usually the Boys Who Cry Wolf That Grow up to Be the Men Who Cry Sanctuary", was released on the compilation This Is Solid State, Volume 5; this song was later re-recorded as "Yellow Dress: Locked Knees" for Everything Is Alive. Later that year, the band recorded its debut album with producer Matt Goldman.

The album name, Everything Is Alive, Everything Is Breathing, Nothing Is Dead, and Nothing Is Bleeding, is a parody of albums that feature morbid names.

== Track listing ==
No.	Title	Length
1.	"Before There Was Atlanta, There Was Douglasville"	2:15
2.	"Someday, in the Event That Mankind Actually Figures Out What It Is That This World Revolves Around, Thousands of People are Going to Be Shocked and Perplexed to Find Out It Was Not Them. Sometimes, This Includes Me."	1:58
3.	"Dialogue with a Question Mark"	2:11
4.	"Die Interviewer (I Am Only Speaking in German)"	2:40
5.	"And Then, Came Then"	5:19
6.	"The Company, the Comfort, the Grave"	2:26
7.	"The Bullet Never Lies, and Time Will Prove All Things (An Allegory of Unfaithful Jerusalem)"	2:57
8.	"Yellow Dress: Locked Knees"	1:59
9.	"If Wishes Were Horses, More Beggars Would Ride Them"	3:09
10.	"Good Night My Lady, and a Forever Farewell"	2:59

The song "Someday, in the Event That Mankind Actually Figures Out What it is That This World Revolves Around, Thousands of People are Going to Be Shocked and Perplexed to Find Out it Was Not Them. Sometimes, This Includes Me." (track 2) is currently the 13th longest song title, with 38 words.

The sampler at the end of Track 2 was a voicemail left on producer Matt Goldman's cell phone while he and the band were on a lunch break from recording.

When reversed, the talking at the end of Track 7 is Josh Scogin heard saying, "That has to be a keeper 'cause I was mooning everybody."

== Personnel ==
The Chariot

- Josh Scogin – vocals
- Keller Harbin – guitar, vocals
- Joshua Beiser – bass
- Tony Medina – guitar
- Jeff Carter – drums, percussion

Additional musicians

- Bradley Hathaway – backing vocals (track 4)
- Matt Hinton – banjo
- Troy Glessner – lap steel guitar
