= As Cities Burn =

American Christian post-hardcore band

Background information
- Origin: Mandeville, Louisiana, US
- Genres: Christian rock, post-hardcore, indie rock
- Years active: 2002–2009, 2011–2016, 2017–2023, 2025–Present
- Labels: Solid State, Tooth & Nail, Equal Vision
- Members: Cody Bonnette; Aaron Lunsford
- Past members: Pascal Barone; TJ Bonnette; Bryan Dixon; Stephen Keech; Colin Kimble; Chris Lott; Hunter Walls

As Cities Burn is an American post-hardcore band from Mandeville, Louisiana, that formed in 2002 and has released four studio albums. Their debut, Son, I Loved You at Your Darkest, was released in 2005. Two years later, they released Come Now Sleep. Then, in 2009, As Cities Burn released their third album, Hell or High Water. The band had performed from 2011 through 2016, but drummer Aaron Lunsford announced, on August 16, 2016, that the group disbanded. In December 2017, As Cities Burn reunited and went on tour to open up for Emery, and announced that they were staying together and writing new music.

== History ==
=== Early beginnings and Son, I Loved You at Your Darkest (2002–2006) ===
As an unsigned act, the group drew the attention of Solid State Records, an imprint of Tooth & Nail Records, which signed them in 2004.

They released their first full-length album, Son, I Loved You at Your Darkest on June 21, 2005, and were featured in Solid State's Young Bloods Tour with The Chariot, Showbread, and He Is Legend. In 2006 they toured with The Bled, Protest The Hero and Sincebyman. They held two CD release shows for this album: June 21 at Covington in Louisiana, LA and June 22 at Vinos in Little Rock, AR.

Son, I Loved You at Your Darkest had mostly a post-hardcore sound. The album contained heavy screaming by front man TJ Bonnette, with back-up vocals from his younger brother Cody Bonnette. A dark, dramatic, and emotional sound was consistent throughout the record. "The Widow" (clean vocals by Cody) was a hint of what As Cities Burn would later sound like without the screaming of TJ.

=== Hiatus and Come Now Sleep (2006–2008) ===
On June 10, 2006, the band announced the end of As Cities Burn, but in early July — after an outpouring of support from fans — decided to remain together. The band's final concert was to be on August 19, 2006, at the House of Blues in New Orleans, LA. However, soon afterwards the band decided they would remain together and record a new album.

In summer 2006, on what was to be their last tour, they parted ways with bassist Pascal Barone, shortly after their announcement that they were staying together. For the remainder of the tour they performed with Robert Chisolm, singer of the band Jonezetta. After the tour they returned home to record a new album, with current guitarist Colin Kimble playing bass.

On December 17 (midnight of December 16), the band released a demo on MySpace and PureVolume of a new track from their upcoming album, which they recorded in early 2007. It surprised fans due to its complete lack of screaming, which had been the dominant vocal style on their previous releases. The change of vocal styling was a result of TJ Bonnette, As Cities Burn's original vocalist with a screaming style, leaving the band in pursuit of building his relationship with his wife, who lived three hours away. Guitarist Cody, who had sung the clean vocals previously, took over vocals entirely. TJ played one final show with As Cities Burn at the end of January in 2007 at the Highground venue in Metarie.

As Cities Burn spent February and March 2007 recording their newest album. On April 12, 2007, As Cities Burn released the title of their second album, Come Now Sleep. The album was released August 14, 2007. On June 8 at 12:00 am, the song "This Is It, This Is It" was posted on their MySpace and PureVolume profile. On July 2, a second song, "Empire", was added onto their PureVolume page. From August 7 to 9, the album was made available for streaming on the band's MySpace account. On August 14, 2007, Come Now Sleep hit the shelves.

=== Hell or High Water and Breakup (2008–2009) ===
In spring of 2008, As Cities Burn posted in a bulletin on MySpace that they would be at home writing the new album. They recorded the album in summer of 2008. On September 7, 2008, they posted another bulletin that they were "about three weeks" from completing the new record. It was also said to "expect more of the direction (they) began heading in with Come Now Sleep," and that Cody, and their friend Tyler Orr were recording the record almost entirely by themselves. On January 2, 2009, the band posted a new recording entitled "Gates" on their MySpace page, which was a song the band had played numerous times at the end of live sets. On January 10, at their Texas show, they debuted "'84 Sheepdog". On March 30, "'84 Sheepdog" was posted on their MySpace page. Starting April 2, a new track was posted every Monday up to the release of the album. The songs posted were "Into the Sea", "Pirate Blues", and "Errand Rum". The Hell or High Water album was released on April 21.

In an interview in HM Magazine, Cody Bonnette stated, "The dream is to never break up, eventually start to suck more and more, and fade away." However, on July 15, 2009, As Cities Burn announced on their MySpace page that they had broken up. They released the following statement:

As Cities Burn has broken up. We are happily moving on after 6 good years. Our lives and our wives have called us in different directions. Thanks to anyone who has come out to a show, had words to say, or bought a CD to help us fill the tank.

=== New projects (2008–2011) ===
Chris Lott went on to play guitar for Twin Killers. Cody Bonnette and Aaron Lunsford have started a new band called Hawkboy, and toured with Emery in the We Do What We Want Tour. Their sets involve covering As Cities Burn's music, as well a few new originals. Hawkboy has recorded a free EP that can be downloaded on iTunes, or accessed through their Facebook page.

=== Reunions and Break-ups (2011–2025) ===
On August 30, 2011, As Cities Burn updated their Facebook status saying "Stay tuned for news regarding As Cities Burn". The band made a Twitter account shortly thereafter, through which they tweeted "Reunion show" followed by the hashtag #silyayd, which is an abbreviation for their album Son, I Loved You at Your Darkest. They announced that they would be playing the album in its entirety with TJ at Unsilent Night, a festival in Dallas, TX. Barone was not present on stage in Dallas, but instead Kimble remained on bass while Lott took Kimble's place on rhythm guitar. On February 6, 2012, the band announced via their Facebook page that they would also be playing the full album in Nashville and Baton Rouge in April.

In July 2012, they played a short tour with UK band The Elijah, including The Sugarmill, Stoke and Summerjam/Deadbolt Clubnight @ Zoo, Manchester.

According to the band's Facebook page, the band is "resurrected".

On October 9, 2012, it was announced that As Cities Burn would be playing all dates of Underoath's Farewell Tour with MewithoutYou and Letlive in early 2013. It was also announced that Stephen Keech, vocalist of well-known Christian metalcore group Haste the Day will be playing bass on the tour.

On June 1, 2015, the band released the music video for a new song, "Prince of Planet Earth", on YouTube.

On July 1, 2015, the band added another new song to YouTube, "Goldmine".

On August 3, 2016, the band added longtime touring member and Haste the Day vocalist, Stephen Keech to the lineup on bass and vocals. Although, he didn't end up touring with the band towards the end of their tenure and his position was filled by touring bassists. The band issued a statement on August 17, 2016, stating the band had ended, "this time for good", and cancelled remaining performances, with apologies to ticket-holders.

On December 6, 2017, the band announced a tour with Emery via their Facebook page, along with the message "WE ARE BACK". TJ rejoined the group and adding their long time friend Hunter Walls (formerly of Mychildren Mybride formerly of Better Off) on guitar, the band would set out to write and record a 4th studio album. On July 31, 2018, it was announced that As Cities Burn would join Silverstein for their 15-year anniversary tour of their album, When Broken Is Easily Fixed, with Hawthorne Heights and Capstan from November 9 – December 15, 2018.

On November 8, 2018, the band released their first single in three years, "2020 AD", and announced that they signed to Equal Vision Records.

On September 12, 2023, the band announced on social media that they would be breaking up after playing the 2023 rendition of Furnace Fest on September 24. Cody and Hunter were the only official members present, the band had a fill-in bassist and drummer for their final set. Near the end of that set it was announced of their new project called My Only Passenger.

=== Return and brain matter(s) (2025–present) ===
On May 21, 2025 Emery announced the third leg of their The Question 20th Anniversary tour with As Cities Burn as support, signifying another reunion.

As Cities Burn announced a new album, brain matter(s), produced by Aaron Sprinkle and featuring contributions from former member Christopher Lott and Emery member Matt Carter, was available to stream for members of the band's Substack in August 2026. Later in the month, they released the album to the public for free via Lockstep.stream.

== Members ==
- Cody Bonnette – clean vocals, guitar, keyboards, programming, lead vocals
- Aaron Lunsford – drums, percussion

Former members

- Pascal Barone – bass (2002–2006)
- TJ Bonnette – screamed vocals, programming, piano (2002–2007, 2011–2016, 2017–2023)
- Bryan Dixon – drums (2002–2003)
- Stephen Keech – bass, backing vocals (live 2012–2013, 2015–2016; 2016, 2017–?)
- Colin Kimble – bass, (2006–2009, 2011–2014) guitar, (2002–2006, 2014–2016) backing vocals (2002–2009, 2011–2016)
- Chris Lott – guitar, backing vocals (2006–2009, 2011–2016)
- Hunter Walls - guitar (formerly of Mychildren Mybride and Better Off) (2017–2023)

== Discography ==
Studio albums

Year	Title	Label	Chart positions		
Year	Title	Label	Top 200	US Christian	US Heat
2005	Son, I Loved You at Your Darkest	Solid State Records	—	19	32
2007	Come Now Sleep	Solid State Records/Tooth & Nail Records	135	5	—
2009	Hell or High Water	Tooth & Nail Records	109	9	—
2019	Scream Through the Walls	Equal Vision Records	—	—	—
2026	brain matter(s)	Lockstep	—	—	—

EPs

- 2003: As Cities Burn... (2003)
- 2004: As Cities Burn EP (2004)
- 2007: The EP
- 2015: Prince of Planet Earth / Goldmine (2015)

== Videography ==
- "Bloodsucker Pt. II"
- "Empire"
- "The Widow" (live)
- "Prince of Planet Earth" (Official Lyric Video)
- "Goldmine"
- "Chains"
