= Matt Goldman =

- Born: December 30, 1969 (age 56); Spartanburg, South Carolina, United States
- Occupations: Record producer, engineer, mixer, and songwriter

Matt Goldman (born December 30, 1969) is an American record producer, audio engineer, mixer, and songwriter based in Nashville, Tennessee (Previously Atlanta, Georgia.)

== Biography ==
Born in Spartanburg, South Carolina, United States, Goldman is a drummer by trade. Goldman currently calls Glow in the Dark Studio in Atlanta home. The latest iteration of Glow in The Dark Studio is housed in the former location of renowned Cheshire Sound Studios, the first dual 24 track facility in the Southeast.

Goldman has worked with Underoath, Copeland, The Chariot, As Cities Burn, Mychildren Mybride, Vanna, Cartel, Meg & Dia, Oceana, and more.

== Select discography ==
2003

- Casting Crowns, Casting Crowns (Beach Street) (E)

2004

- The Chariot, Everything Is Alive, Everything Is Breathing, Nothing Is Dead, and Nothing Is Bleeding (Tooth & Nail) (P/E/M)

2005

- As Cities Burn, Son, I Loved You at Your Darkest (Tooth & Nail) (P/E/I/Prog)
- The Love Affair / Sonnet to Sleep, Sonnet to Sleep EP (Independent| South Pawl Records) (P/E/M)

2006

- Anathallo, Floating World (Nettwerk) (E/M)
- Underoath, "Define the Great Line" (Tooth & Nail Records and Solid State Records) (P/E)

2007

- Four Letter Lie, What A Terrible Thing To Say (Victory Records) (P/E/M)
- Meg & Dia "Mighty R-E-A-L" (Major League Soccer/Real Salt Lake/Dog House) (P/E/M)

2008

- Underoath, Lost in the Sound of Separation (Tooth & Nail Records and Solid State Records) (P/E)

2009

- Four Letter Lie, A New Day (Victory Records) (P/E/M)
- The Chariot, Wars and Rumors of Wars (Tooth & Nail) (P/E/M)

2010

- Eagle Scout, New Hands (P/E/M)
- Underoath, Ø (Disambiguation) (Tooth and Nail Records) (P/E)
- Oceana, Clean Head (Rise Records) (P/E/M)

2011

- Becoming the Archetype, Celestial Completion (Solid State Records) (P/E/M)
- Vanna, And They Came Baring Bones (Artery Recordings) (P/E/M)
- Dinner and a Suit, "Since Our Departure"

2012

- The Chariot One Wing (Good Fight Records) (P/E/M)
- Thera From The North EP (Independent) (P/E/M)

2013

- The Devil Wears Prada, 8:18 (Roadrunner) (P/E)
- My Epic, Behold (P/E/M)

2014

- Anberlin, Lowborn (Tooth & Nail) (E)
- '68, In Humor and Sadness (eOne) (P/E/M)

2015

- Haste the Day, Coward (Solid State Records)
- John Coffey, The Great News (V2 Records) (P/E/M)
- Belle Haven, Everything Ablaze (Halfcut Records)
- Foreveratlast, Ghosts Again (Victory Records)

2016

- Sherwood, Some Things Never Leave You (BC Music) (M)
- SayWeCanFly, Blessed Ar Those (Epitaph) (M)

2017

- Tigerwine, Die With Your Tongue Out (Blood and Ink) (P/E/M)
- '68, Two Parts Viper (Cooking Vinyl) (P/E/M)
