= The Devil Wears Prada discography =

- Studio albums: 8
- EPs: 5
- Live albums: 1
- Singles: 29
- Music videos: 30
- Demo: 1

The Devil Wears Prada, an American metalcore band from Dayton, Ohio, have released eight studio albums, one demo, five extended plays, twenty-nine singles and thirty music videos.

== Albums ==
=== Studio albums ===
| Year | Album | Label | Chart peaks | | | | | Sales |
| Year | Album | Label | US | US Indie | AUS | CAN | UK | Sales |
|---|---|---|---|---|---|---|---|---|
| 2006 | Dear Love: A Beautiful Discord | Rise | — | — | — | — | — | |
| 2007 | Plagues | Rise | 57 | 6 | — | — | — | |
| 2009 | With Roots Above and Branches Below | Ferret Music | 11 | 1 | — | — | — | |
| 2011 | Dead Throne | Ferret Music | 10 | 1 | 44 | 66 | 166 | US: 92,000 |
| 2013 | 8:18 | Roadrunner | 20 | — | 62 | — | — | US: 50,000 |
| 2016 | Transit Blues | Rise | 56 | 13 | 100 | — | — | |
| 2019 | The Act | Solid State | 70 | 4 | — (Note: The Act did not enter the ARIA Albums Chart, but peaked at number 40 on the ARIA Digital Album Chart.) | — | — | |
| 2022 | Color Decay | Solid State | 200 | 31 | — | — | — | |
| 2025 | Flowers | Solid State | — (Note: Flowers did not enter the Billboard 200, but peaked at No. 37 on the Top Current Album Sales.) | — | — | — | — | |
"—" denotes a release that did not chart

=== Live albums ===
| Year | Album | Label |
|---|---|---|
| 2012 | Dead & Alive | Ferret Music |

=== Compilations ===
- Punk Goes Crunk – "Still Fly" (Big Tymers cover; 2008)
- Warped Tour 2008 – "Reptar, King of the Ozone" (2008)
- Warped Tour 2009 – "Sassafras" (2009)
- Warped Tour 2011 – "Anatomy" (2011)
- Warped Tour 2014 – "Sailor's Prayer" (2014)

=== Demos ===
- Patterns of a Horizon (The Foundation Recording Studios, 2005; rereleased physically by Fantasy Initiative, 2026)

== EPs ==
| Year | Album | Label | Chart peaks | | |
| Year | Album | Label | US | US Indie | AUS |
|---|---|---|---|---|---|
| 2010 | Zombie | Ferret Music | 10 | 2 | — |
| 2015 | Space | Rise | 32 | 2 | 47 |
| 2021 | ZII | Solid State | 110 | 15 | — |
| 2023 | Salt (feat. Dayseeker) | Solid State | — | — | — |
| 2024 | Chemical (Acoustic) | Solid State | — | — | — |

== Singles ==
| Year | Song | Chart peaks | | | | Album |
| Year | Song | US Main | US Hard Rock | US Christ | US Christ Digital | Album |
|---|---|---|---|---|---|---|
| 2010 | "Outnumbered" | — | — | — | — | Zombie |
| 2011 | "Born to Lose" | — | — | — | — | Dead Throne |
| 2011 | "R.I.T." | — | — | — | — | Dead Throne |
| 2012 | "Mammoth" | — | — | — | — | Dead Throne |
| 2013 | "Martyrs" | — | — | — | — | 8:18 |
| 2013 | "Home for Grave" | — | — | — | 17 | 8:18 |
| 2013 | "First Sight" | — | — | — | — | 8:18 |
| 2014 | "Sailor's Prayer" | — | — | — | — | 8:18 |
| 2014 | "War" | — | — | — | — | 8:18 |
| 2015 | "South of the City" | — | — | 42 | 30 | Non-album single |
| 2015 | "Supernova" | — | — | — | — | Space |
| 2015 | "Alien" | — | — | — | — | Space |
| 2016 | "Daughter" | — | — | — | — | Transit Blues |
| 2016 | "To the Key of Evergreen" | — | — | — | — | Transit Blues |
| 2018 | "Sour Breath" (Julien Baker cover) | — | — | — | — | Non-album single |
| 2019 | "Lines of Your Hands" | — | — | — | — | The Act |
| 2019 | "Please Say No" | — | — | — | — | The Act |
| 2019 | "Chemical" | — | — | 47 | — | The Act |
| 2021 | "Termination" | — | — | — | — | ZII |
| 2021 | "Nightfall" | — | — | — | — | ZII |
| 2021 | "Sacrifice" | — | — | — | — | Color Decay |
| 2022 | "Watchtower" | — | — | — | — | Color Decay |
| 2022 | "Salt" | — | — | — | — | Color Decay |
| 2022 | "Time" | — | — | — | — | Color Decay |
| 2022 | "Broken" | — | — | — | — | Color Decay |
| 2023 | "Reaching" | — | — | — | — | Color Decay |
| 2023 | "Reasons" (with Excision and Wooli or LØLØ) | — | — | — | — | Chemical (Acoustic) - EP |
| 2023 | "Ignorance" | — | — | — | — | Color Decay |
| 2024 | "Ritual" | — | 18 | — | — | Flowers |
| 2025 | "For You" | 32 | — | — | — | Flowers |
| 2025 | "Where the Flowers Never Grow" | — | — | — | — | Flowers |
| 2025 | "Wave" | — | — | — | — | Flowers |
| 2025 | "So Low" | — | — | — | — | Flowers |
| 2025 | "Eyes" | — | — | — | — | Flowers |
| 2025 | "Everybody Knows" | 25 | — | — | — | Flowers |
| 2025 | "Cure Me" | — | — | — | — | Flowers |
| 2026 | "Play the Old Shit" | — | — | — | — | Flowers |
"—" denotes a release that did not register on that chart.

== Music videos ==
| Year | Song | Director(s) |
|---|---|---|
| 2006 | "Dogs Can Grow Beards All Over" | Unknown |
| 2007 | "Hey John, What's Your Name Again?" | Unknown |
| 2008 | "HTML Rulez D00d" | Endeavor Media |
| 2009 | "Danger: Wildman" | Spencer Nicholson |
| 2010 | "Assistant to the Regional Manager" | Endeavor Media |
| 2011 | "Born to Lose" | Drew Russ |
| 2012 | "Dead Throne" | Unknown |
| 2012 | "Vengeance" | Michael Thelin |
| 2012 | "Mammoth" | Drew Russ |
| 2013 | "Martyrs" | Jeremy DePoyster & Andy Trick |
| 2013 | "First Sight" | Maria Juranic |
| 2014 | "Sailor's Prayer" | Robert Sexton |
| 2014 | "War" | Maria Juranic |
| 2015 | "Planet A" | Casey Pierce |
| 2015 | "Alien" | Casey Pierce |
| 2016 | "Daughter" | Casey Pierce |
| 2016 | "To the Key of Evergreen" | Maria Juranic |
| 2017 | "Worldwide" | Casey Pierce |
| 2019 | "Chemical" | Kevin Johnson |
| 2020 | "The Thread" | Max Moore |
| 2021 | "Forlorn" | Unknown |
| 2021 | "Sacrifice" | Kate McFerren & Christopher Commons |
| 2022 | "Watchtower" | Kate McFerren & Christopher Commons |
| 2022 | "Salt" | Kate McFerren & Christopher Commons |
| 2022 | "Time" | Kate McFerren & Christopher Commons |
| 2022 | "Broken" | Christopher Commons |
| 2023 | "Cancer" | Kate McFerren & Christopher Commons |
| 2023 | "Reaching" | Kate McFerren & Christopher Commons |
| 2023 | "Ignorance" | Kate McFerren & Christopher Commons |
| 2024 | "Ritual" | Wyatt Clough |
| 2025 | "For You" | Wyatt Clough |
| 2025 | "Where the Flowers Never Grow"/"Wave" | Wyatt Clough |
| 2025 | "So Low" | Wyatt Clough |
| 2025 | "Eyes" | Wyatt Clough |
| 2025 | "Everybody Knows" | Unknown |
| 2026 | "When You're Gone" | Unknown |
