= Daniel Williams (drummer) =

American musician (1985–2025)

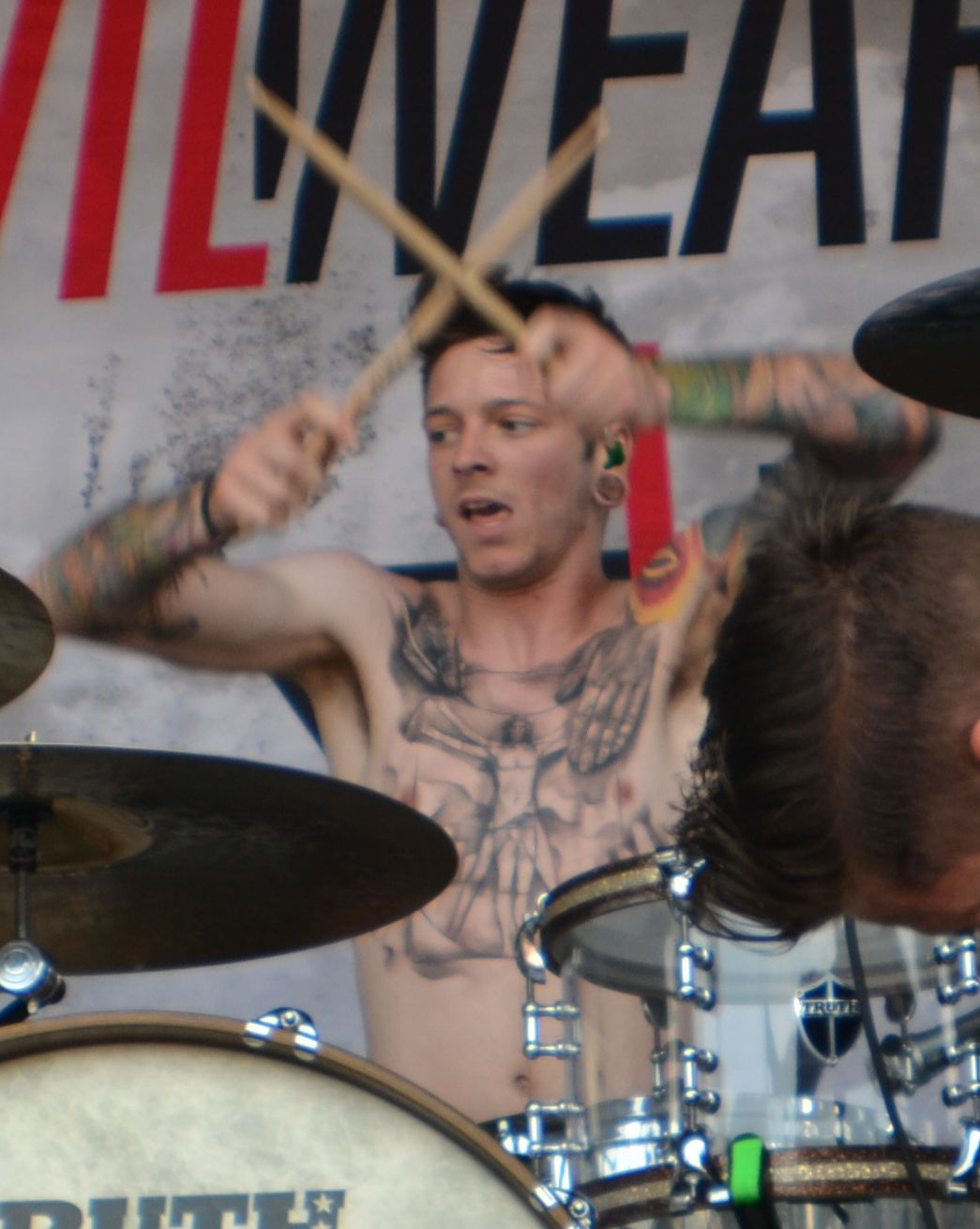
- Williams with The Devil Wears Prada band in 2011

Background information
- Born: December 12, 1985
- Origin: Dayton, Ohio, U.S.
- Died: May 22, 2025 (aged 39) San Diego, California, U.S.
- Genres: Metalcore; Christian metal
- Occupations: Musician; software engineer
- Instrument: Drums
- Years active: 2005–2016
- Formerly of: The Devil Wears Prada

Daniel Williams (December 12, 1985 – May 22, 2025) was an American musician. He was the drummer and co-founder of the metalcore band The Devil Wears Prada. He performed with the group from its inception in 2005 until his departure in 2016. He died in a plane crash on 22 May 2025.

== Life and career ==
Daniel Williams was born on December 12, 1985, and grew up in Dayton, Ohio. He began playing drums in the sixth grade, starting with the snare drum in his school music class. He continued through high school, eventually joining a punk band with friends.

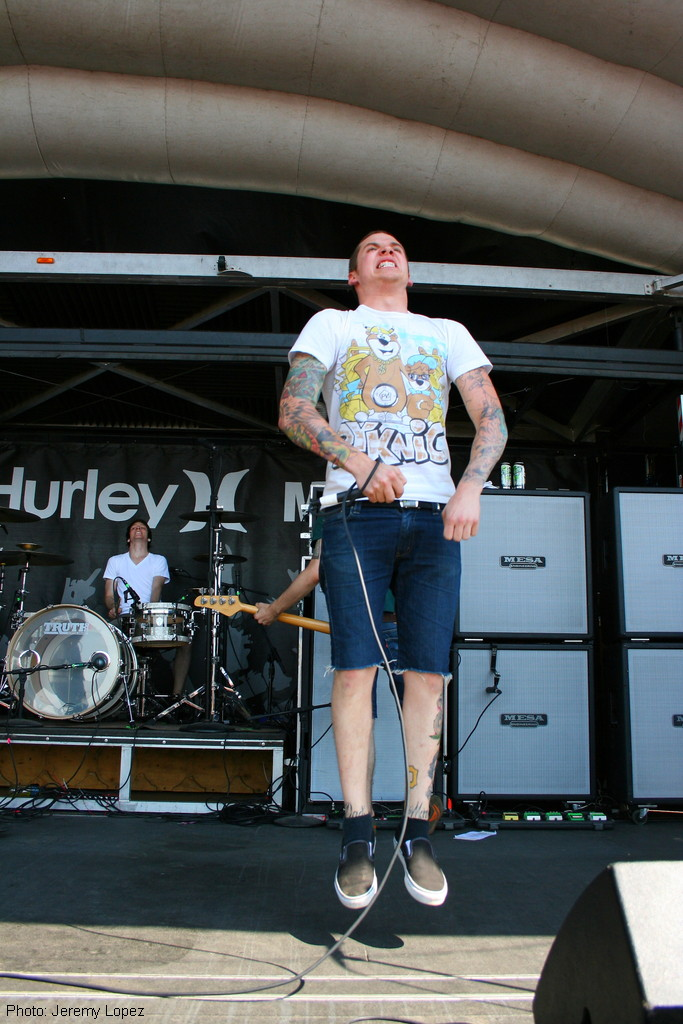
Williams (back) with Mike Hranica in 2008

Williams began his career as the drummer for the American metalcore band The Devil Wears Prada, which he co-founded alongside Mike Hranica, Chris Rubey, Jeremy DePoyster, James Baney and Andy Trick, and performed on multiple studio albums, including Dear Love: A Beautiful Discord (2006), Plagues (2007), With Roots Above and Branches Below (2009), Dead Throne (2011), and 8:18 (2013).

In 2012, he performed with the band on their debut live album, Dead & Alive. The album was recorded on December 14, 2011, during the band's Dead Throne Tour at The Palladium in Worcester, Massachusetts.

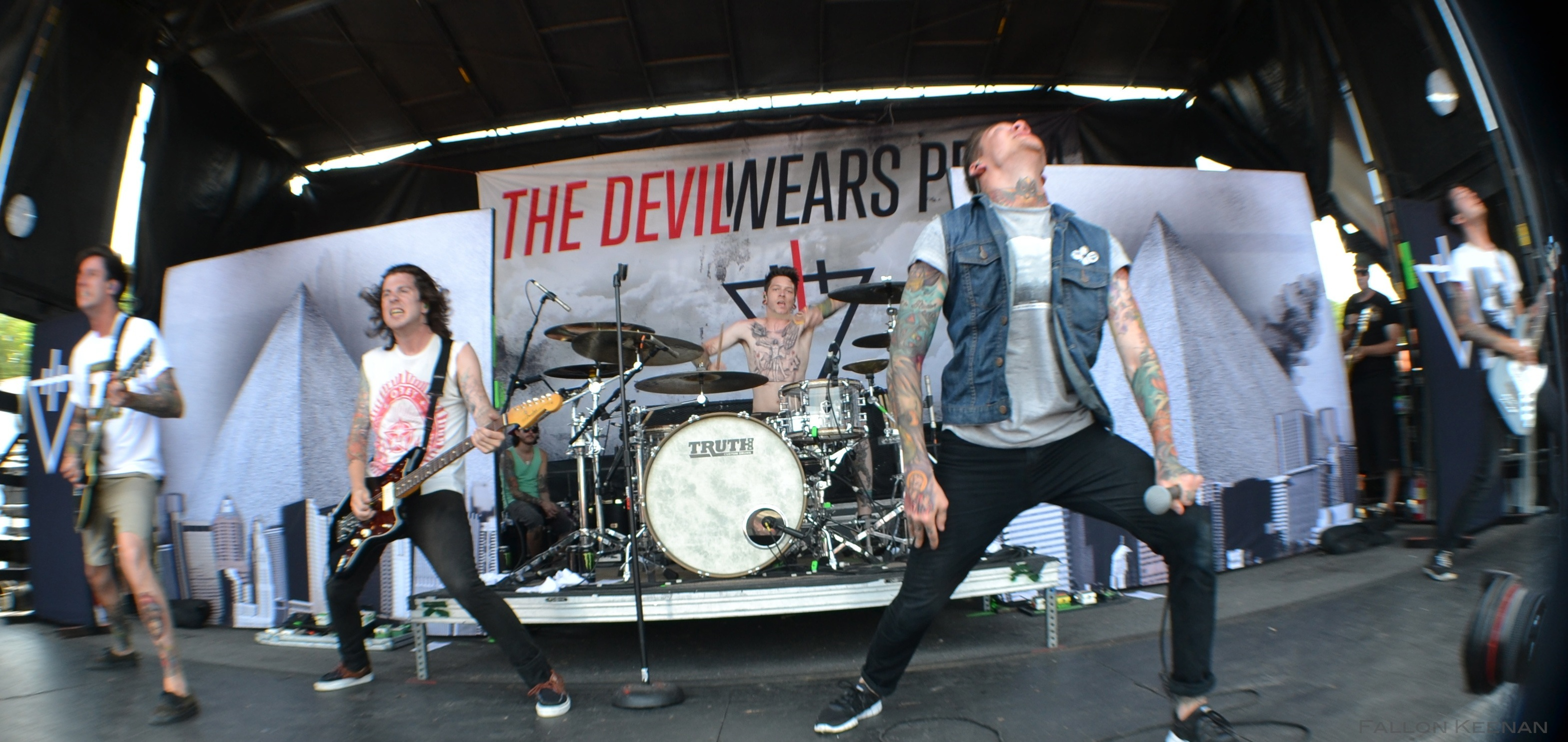
Williams (middle) with the band in 2011

Williams left the band in 2016. Following his departure, he began working in the tech industry, including serving as a senior software architect at GoPro and had recently accepted a role at Apple Inc. shortly before his death.

== Death ==
On May 22, 2025, Williams died in a plane crash in San Diego, California. He was aboard a Cessna 550 Citation II jet that crashed into the Murphy Canyon neighborhood near Montgomery-Gibbs Executive Airport at approximately 3:45 a.m. local time. The aircraft, piloted by music agent Dave Shapiro, was en route from Teterboro Airport in New Jersey, with a fuel stop in Wichita, Kansas, before its intended arrival in San Diego.

According to his father, Larry Williams, his son was among the victims of the crash. The incident resulted in a fire that affected part of a residential neighborhood consisting of U.S. Navy-owned housing.

Hours before the crash, Williams shared photos from inside the cockpit on his Instagram account, captioning one with "Here we gooooo." Following the incident, The Devil Wears Prada paid tribute to Williams on social media, stating, "No words. We owe you everything. Love you forever."

== Artistry ==
Early in his career, Williams was influenced by bands such as Underoath and blink-182, with Travis Barker's drumming style impacting his own. He preferred a minimalist drum setup, believing that "less is more", and utilized high-set cymbals for visual effect, a choice inspired by Barker. He also cited Dave Lombardo of Slayer and Joey Jordison of Slipknot as major influences on his drumming style.

During the recording of the album Dead Throne (2011), Williams worked closely with producer Adam Dutkiewicz of Killswitch Engage. Dutkiewicz challenged Williams by having him play songs repeatedly to achieve perfection, pushing him to refine his drumming technique. In live performances, Williams was described as "just metal" and "aggressive", during his working in The Devil Wears Prada. He said he especially enjoyed performing songs such as "Untidaled" and "Mammoth" because of their rhythm and energy.

== Equipment ==
Daniel Williams was endorsed by Truth Drums beginning in 2008 and used their custom kits throughout much of his career. His setup typically included DW hardware, Meinl cymbals, and Trick Pro1V pedals.

In 2013, Williams utilized a custom SJC drum kit during the recording of 8:18 and the EP Space (2015), as well as on the corresponding tours. The kit featured a unique hand-inlaid maple veneer brick pattern over cement mortar, with all-maple shells and custom wooden eagle badges. The configuration included a 24x16-inch virgin bass drum, a 12x8-inch rack tom, and 15x13-inch and 16x14-inch floor toms.

== Personal life ==
Williams expressed interests outside of his music career, including surfing, snorkeling, motorcycling, and reading comics. He also described himself as engaging in "nerdy" hobbies such as playing video games and attempting to get into rock climbing.

In August 2019, Williams was present during the mass shooting in Dayton. He was at the Ned Peppers Bar, located in the city’s Oregon District, along with a friend. Williams later stated on social media that he had been on the back patio of the bar when the shooting began. Believing initially that the gunfire was coming from outside, he and others reentered the building to seek cover. The incident resulted in nine fatalities and at least 26 injuries.

Williams was in a relationship with a content creator, Hannah Ray, for 14 years — from May 22, 2011, until his death on May 22, 2025.

== Discography ==
=== With The Devil Wears Prada ===
==== Studio albums ====
- Dear Love: A Beautiful Discord (2006)
- Plagues (2007)
- With Roots Above and Branches Below (2009)
- Dead Throne (2011)
- 8:18 (2013)

==== EPs ====
- Zombie (2010)
- Space (2015)

==== Live albums ====
- Dead & Alive (2012)
