= Dead & Alive (The Devil Wears Prada album) =

Live album by The Devil Wears Prada
- Released: June 26, 2012
- Recorded: December 14, 2011
- Venue: The Palladium, Worcester, Massachusetts
- Genre: Metalcore
- Length: 59:39 (CD); 72:32 (DVD)
- Label: Ferret, Roadrunner (outside US)
- Producer: The Devil Wears Prada, Michael Thelin

The Devil Wears Prada chronology
| Dead Throne (2011) | Dead & Alive (2012) | 8:18 (2013) |

Dead & Alive is the first live album by American metalcore band The Devil Wears Prada. It was released on June 26, 2012, through Ferret Music. The album was recorded on December 14, 2011, in Worcester, Massachusetts on the Dead Throne US Tour. This is the last album to feature keyboard player James Baney, before he left the band on February 22, 2012. The album contains a DVD with the live show and also a CD album, which contains songs from their previous albums including the latest album, Dead Throne. To promote the album, the band released a video for "Vengeance" that was recorded live from the tour.

Professional ratings
Review scores
| Source | Rating |
|---|---|
| Absolute Punk | 80% |
| AllMusic | 3/5 stars |

== Track listing ==
All lyrics are written by Mike Hranica (except where noted); all music is composed by The Devil Wears Prada.

CD
| No. | Title | Writer(s) | Album | Length |
|---|---|---|---|---|
| 1. | "Dead Throne" | Mike Hranica, Andy Trick, Chris Rubey, Jeremy DePoyster, Daniel Williams, James Baney | Dead Throne | 3:20 |
| 2. | "Untidaled" | Hranica, Trick, Rubey, DePoyster, Williams, Baney | Dead Throne | 2:57 |
| 3. | "Escape" | Hranica, Trick, Rubey, DePoyster, Williams, Baney | Zombie EP | 4:28 |
| 4. | "Sassafras" | Hranica | With Roots Above and Branches Below | 3:13 |
| 5. | "Born to Lose" | Hranica, Trick, Rubey, DePoyster, Williams, Baney | Dead Throne | 3:36 |
| 6. | "Mammoth" | Hranica, Trick, Rubey, DePoyster, Williams, Baney | Dead Throne | 3:19 |
| 7. | "Kansas" (Instrumental) | Hranica, Trick, Rubey, DePoyster, Williams, Baney | Dead Throne | 3:41 |
| 8. | "Hey John, What's Your Name Again?" | Hranica | Plagues | 3:28 |
| 9. | "Vengeance" | Hranica, Trick, Rubey, DePoyster, Williams, Baney | Dead Throne | 2:51 |
| 10. | "Outnumbered" | Hranica, Trick, Rubey, DePoyster, Williams, Baney | Zombie EP | 4:25 |
| 11. | "Assistant to the Regional Manager" | Hranica | With Roots Above and Branches Below | 4:47 |
| 12. | "Dez Moines" | Hranica | With Roots Above and Branches Below | 4:09 |
| 13. | "Dogs Can Grow Beards All Over" | Hranica | Dear Love: A Beautiful Discord | 4:24 |
| 14. | "Chicago" | Hranica, Trick, Rubey, DePoyster, Williams, Baney | Dead Throne | 3:10 |
| 15. | "Constance" | Hranica, Trick, Rubey, DePoyster, Williams, Baney | Dead Throne | 3:15 |
| 16. | "Danger: Wildman" | Hranica | With Roots Above and Branches Below | 4:36 |
| Total length: | | | | 59:39 |

DVD
| No. | Title | Length |
|---|---|---|
| 1. | "Dead & Alive Live from Worcester, Massachusetts" (from the Dead Throne US Tour) | 1:12:32 |

== Personnel ==
The Devil Wears Prada

- Daniel Williams – drums
- Andy Trick – bass guitar
- Chris Rubey – lead guitar, backing vocals
- Jeremy DePoyster – rhythm guitar, clean vocals
- Mike Hranica – lead vocals, guitar (track 7)
- James Baney – keyboard, synthesizer, piano

Production

- Produced by The Devil Wears Prada & Michael Thelin
- Crew: James Barrett, Ben Wilcox, Dustin Derosier, Ben Gering, Filip Isard and Jeff Verne
- Engineered by Garrett Davis, Ben Wilcox, Jon Gering, Chris Rubey
- Assistant engineer by Brian Thomason
- Mixed by Garrett Davis, @ West Main
- Management by Randy Dease, Mark Mercado and John Youngman
- Filmed, Edited & photo by Jeremy DePoyster
- Composed by The Devil Wears Prada
- Back cover photo by Adam Elmakias
- Mastered by Troy Glessner, @ Spectre Mastering
- Package design by Mike Hranica and Chris Rubey
- Package layout by Alex Krizhner
- Booking by Dave Shapiro and Tom Taaffe (The Agency Group)
- Directed by Michael Thelin
- Lighting design by Jeff Verne

== Charts ==
| Chart (2012) | Peak position |
|---|---|
| Top Christian Albums | 7 |
| Hard Rock Albums | 22 |
| Independent Albums | 46 |
