= Transit Blues =

Studio album by The Devil Wears Prada
- Released: October 7, 2016
- Genre: Metalcore
- Length: 38:12
- Label: Rise
- Producer: Dan Korneff, The Devil Wears Prada

The Devil Wears Prada chronology
Space (2015)	Transit Blues (2016)	The Act (2019)

Singles from Transit Blues
- 1. "Daughter" Released: July 15, 2016; 2. "To the Key of Evergreen" Released: September 26, 2016

Transit Blues is the sixth studio album by American metalcore band The Devil Wears Prada. It was released on October 7, 2016, through Rise Records, their only album on the label since 2007's Plagues. For the album, Giuseppe Capolupo, drummer of Demise of Eros, Haste the Day and Once Nothing, stated he had recorded on Transit Blues, after Daniel Williams left the band. It is also the band's first album to feature Kyle Sipress on guitar.

== Style ==
Transit Blues is a metalcore album, with influences of southern rock and ambient music. The release has also been called "Not just another metalcore album" and regarded as more mature than the band's former "by-the-numbers metalcore" sound.

The album features numerous lyrics inspired by literature; "Praise Poison" references The Sound and the Fury by William Faulkner, "Daughter" references The Mandarins by Simone de Beauvoir, and "To The Key of Evergreen" references Lolita by Vladimir Nabokov.

== Reception ==
Professional ratings
Aggregate scores
Source	Rating
Metacritic	(80/100)
Review scores
Source	Rating
AllMusic	3.5/5 stars
Elite	3.5/5 stars
Exclaim!	8/10
Rock Sound	8/10 stars
Soundfiction	8.9/10 stars

According to the review aggregator Metacritic, Transit Blues received "generally favorable reviews" based on a weighted average score of 80 out of 100 from 5 critic scores.

== Track listing ==
No.	Title	Length
1.	"Praise Poison"	2:34
2.	"Daughter"	2:28
3.	"Worldwide"	3:28
4.	"Lock & Load"	3:19
5.	"Flyover States"	3:24
6.	"Detroit Tapes"	2:12
7.	"The Condition"	4:00
8.	"To the Key of Evergreen"	5:07
9.	"Submersion"	4:13
10.	"Home for Grave, Pt. II"	4:03
11.	"Transit Blues"	3:24
Total length:		38:12

== Personnel ==
All credits by AllMusic

The Devil Wears Prada

- Mike Hranica – lead vocals, additional guitars
- Jeremy DePoyster – clean vocals, rhythm guitar
- Andy Trick – bass guitar
- Kyle Sipress – lead guitar, backing vocals

Additional personnel

- Giuseppe Capolupo – drums
- Jonathan Gering – keyboards, synthesizer

Production

- Dan Korneff – producer, engineer, mixing
- The Devil Wears Prada – producer
- Nick Sferlazza – engineer
- Ted Jensen – mastering
- Ben Wilcox – demo engineer, rehearsal director
- Stephen Harrison – vocals
- Anthony Barlich – photography
- Jonathan Gering – composer
- Mike Hranica – art direction
- Jarryd Nelson – editing
- Alex Prieto – editing
- Micah Sedmak – art direction, design, layout

== Charts ==
Charts	Peak position
US Billboard 200	56
US Top Hard Rock Albums (Billboard)	4
US Independent Albums (Billboard)	13
US Top Rock Albums (Billboard)	7
