= At the Throne of Judgment =

American Melodic Death Metal band

- Also known as: At the Throne of Judgement
- Origin: Lebanon, Ohio, United States
- Genres: Deathcore melodic death metal
- Years active: 2005–2007, 2008–2009, 2012–2013
- Label: Rise (2006–2007)
- Members: Eric Kemp; Brad Weaver; Matt Creekmore; Roger Hensley
- Past members: James Ruehlmann; Adam McKibben; Keith Murphy; Branden "Jagursa" Hunter; Matt Smith; Cory Knight; Trevor Hinesley
- Website: Facebook

At the Throne of Judgment is an American deathcore band from Lebanon, Ohio, United States. The band formed in 2005, signing a deal with Rise Records the following year and released a full-length album titled The Arcanum Order in 2007 before disestablishing the same year. Following the band's break-up, they had a short reunion from 2008 to 2009 and even had plans to record a follow-up album titled Twilight Kings but disbanded again before its completion.

It was not until February, 2013 when the band's Facebook posted an album teaser for the Twilight Kings and new line-up confirming original guitarist Matt Creekmore & original drummer Roger Hensley had rejoined the band.

== History ==
=== Inception, The Arcanum Order, and break-up (2005–2007) ===
Formed in 2005, the band recorded a 5-song demo with producer/engineer Joey Sturgis (The Devil Wears Prada, Into The Catacombs, Every Bridge Burned, Before Their Eyes) of The Foundation Studios in Connersville, Indiana.

After the demo was recorded and released, they were signed by Oregon record label Rise Records in November 2006. The group released their debut full-length album named The Arcanum Order through the label in 2007. The release features three re-recorded versions of songs from the band's demo and like the demo, The Acanum Order was also produced by Sturgis.

The band began touring in May 2007 on the Rise Records tour. The Devil Wears Prada and Drop Dead Gorgeous were the headliners and Dance Gavin Dance was also featured. Before breaking up At the Throne of Judgment toured with such acts as Whitechapel, Winds of Plague, Born of Osiris, The Number 12 Looks Like You, See You Next Tuesday and others.

On December 12, 2007, the band was confirmed to be breaking up due to the member's desires to pursue college educations.

=== Reunion and Twilight Kings (2008–present) ===
In December 2008, At the Throne of Judgment announced that they would be playing the New Year's Eve show at The Attic Club in Kettering, Ohio, along with The Devil Wears Prada, Miss May I, and Lets Get It. At this point, the members were only a part-time band as a majority of them chose to finish college and pursue other career options.

On April 4, 2012, a Facebook page was made for the band. On February 9, 2013, the band posted an album teaser of "Twilight Kings" and a statement that said "To everyone that has been waiting for our studio footage, now is the time! We have been spending lots of time in Filthy Studios working on some new music. Shredbang!".

On September 30, 2013, a Facebook post revealed that the band will be taking a hiatus and will be "retreating to [their] cavernous castle to once again... write metal". They also indicated that they will release new music at a later time.

== Members ==
Present

- Eric Kemp - vocals (2005-2007, 2008–present)
- Matt Creekmore - guitar (2005-2007, 2013–present)
- Brad Weaver - guitar, bass (2005-2007, 2008–2009, 2012-present)
- Roger Hensley - drums (2005-2007, 2013–present)

Past

- Adam McKibben - bass
- James Ruehlmann - guitar
- Matt Smith - vocals
- Keith Murphy - drums
- Trevor Hinesly - bass
- Cory Knight - guitar
- Zach West - bass

== Discography ==
Albums

- The Arcanum Order (Rise Records, 2007)

Demos

- Demo (self-released, 2006)
