= 2025 San Diego Cessna Citation II crash =

2025 aviation accident in California

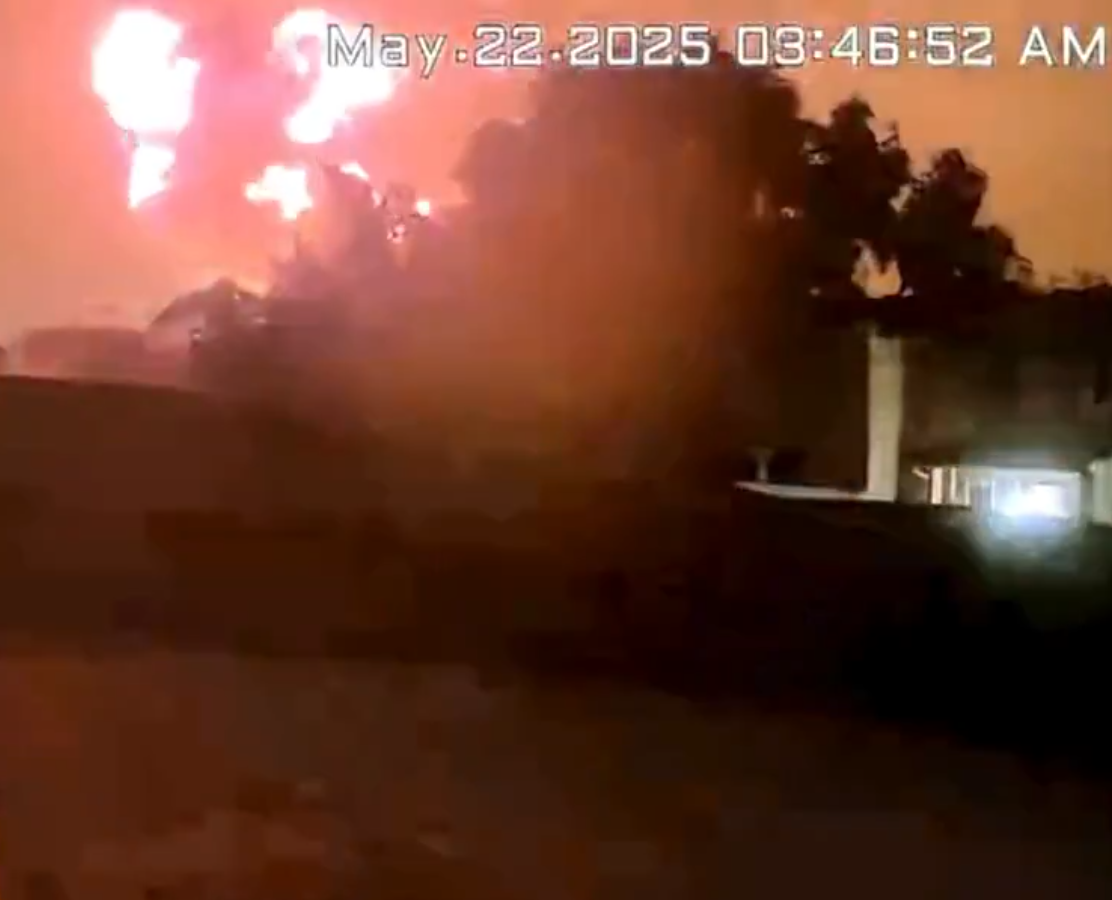
- A CCTV still of the explosion after the crash

Accident
- Date: May 22, 2025
- Summary: Crashed into a residential area, under investigation
- Site: Murphy Canyon, San Diego, California, U.S.; 32°48′12″N 117°06′22″W
- Total fatalities: 6
- Total injuries: 8

Aircraft
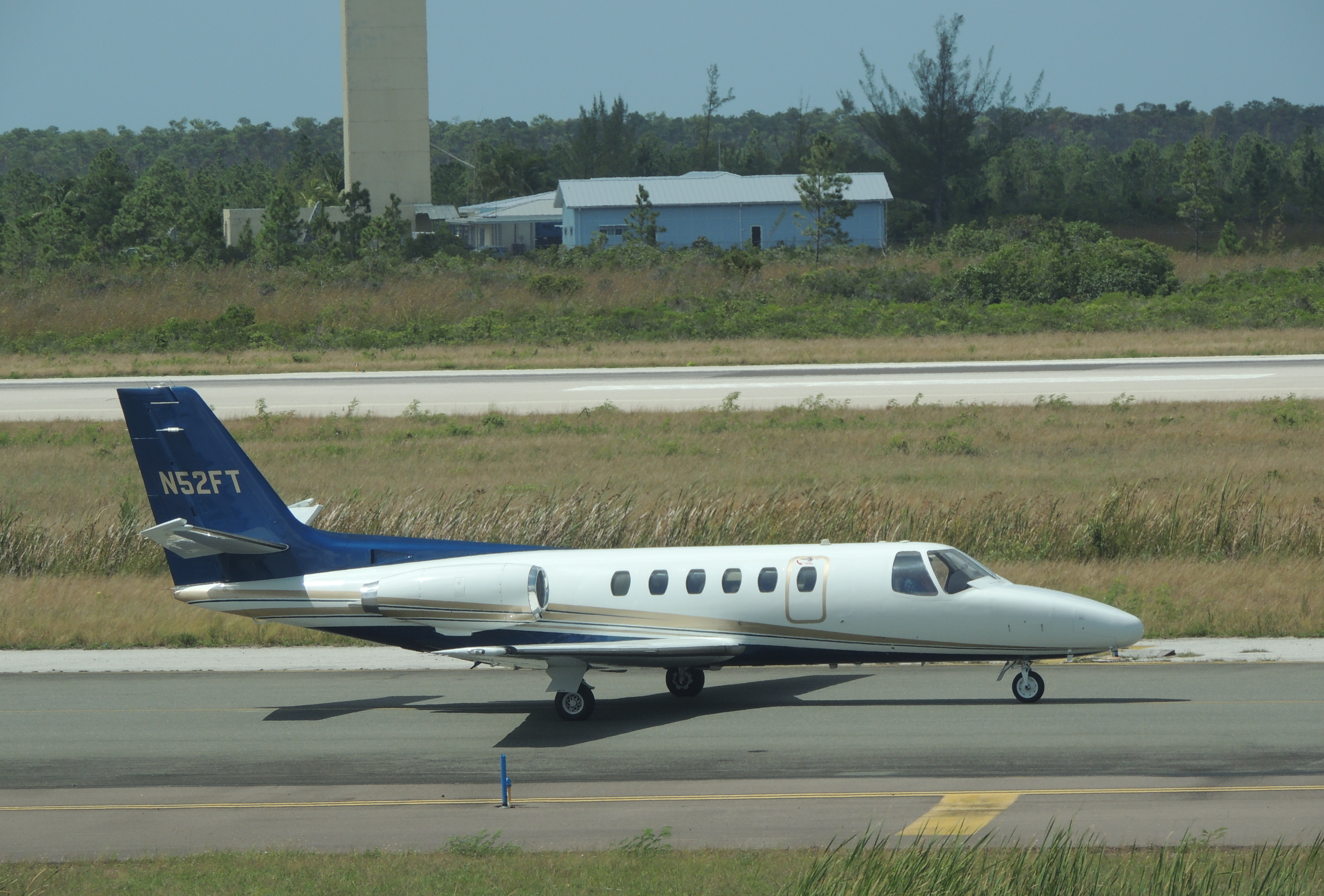
- The aircraft involved in the accident, seen in 2021 with a previous registration
- Aircraft type: Cessna Citation II
- Operator: Daviator LLC
- Registration: N666DS
- Flight origin: Teterboro Airport, Bergen County, New Jersey, U.S.
- Stopover: Colonel James Jabara Airport, Wichita, Kansas, U.S.
- Destination: Montgomery-Gibbs Executive Airport, San Diego, California, U.S.
- Occupants: 6
- Passengers: 5
- Crew: 1
- Fatalities: 6
- Survivors: 0

Ground casualties
- Ground injuries: 8

On May 22, 2025, a Cessna Citation II crashed in the Murphy Canyon neighborhood of San Diego, California, United States, killing all six people aboard the aircraft and injuring at least eight others on the ground. Ten homes were damaged in the crash, one of which was completely destroyed.

== Background ==
=== Aircraft and passengers ===
The Cessna Citation II is primarily used for business travel and can carry six to eight passengers, a pilot, and a co-pilot. According to Federal Aviation Administration (FAA) records, it was built in 1985 and was owned by Dave Shapiro. The registration of the plane was N666DS.

The FAA reported that six people were on board. The occupants of the plane were pilot Shapiro, who was a co-founder of Sound Talent Group; Emma Huke and Kendall Fortner, two employees of Sound Talent Group; photographer Celina Kenyon; Dominic Damian, a software engineer; and Daniel Williams, former drummer of The Devil Wears Prada, who had made several Instagram posts before the crash about getting on the plane.

=== Weather ===
Data from the National Weather Service reported that visibility at airports in the area was one-half statute mile at the time of the crash with low clouds, fog, and mist. After receiving the most recent weather information from air traffic control, indicating that the weather was near or below minimums at nearby airports, the pilot indicated his intent to continue with the approach. Under U.S. regulations for private (Part 91) flights, it is legal to initiate an instrument approach even when reported weather is below the published minimums for that approach, provided the pilot does not descend below those minimums without the required visual references.

=== Prior flight ===
The aircraft departed Teterboro Airport in New Jersey on the night of May 21, 2025. It made a fueling stop at the Colonel James Jabara Airport in Wichita, Kansas, for approximately an hour before flying to Montgomery-Gibbs Executive Airport in San Diego, California. Hours prior to the crash, equipment such as the runway approach lights and weather data systems was disabled at Montgomery-Gibbs by a power surge.

== Crash ==
The Citation was scheduled to land at 03:47 PDT. When it was 3 miles (4.8 km) from the airport, the pilot made a standard radio call on the Montgomery tower frequency, indicating that he was on final approach to runway 28R.

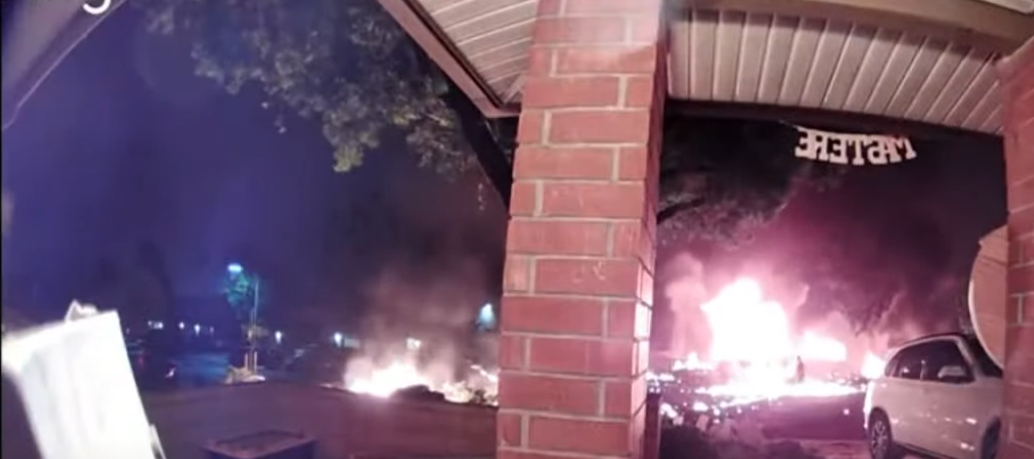
Fire at the crash site moments after the accident

The plane first struck powerlines two miles southeast of Montgomery-Gibbs, where fragments of the aircraft were found, then crashed into the Murphy Canyon neighborhood. Several vehicles and ten homes were damaged, with one house being completely destroyed, as were six vehicles. The homes affected by the crash were military housing. The FAA reported that the crash occurred at approximately 03:45 on May 22, 2025, with the crash being first reported two minutes later. Jet fuel was spread across the area. Over 50 police officers responded to the site within minutes of the crash and HAZMAT was dispatched.

The National Transportation Safety Board (NTSB) later stated that it believed that there were no survivors on the plane. There were no ground fatalities, though eight people suffered injuries; five people from one house were hospitalized for smoke inhalation, while another was hospitalized after trying to escape their house through a window. Two others suffered minor injuries and were treated at the scene. A temporary evacuation site was set up at Miller Elementary School, where almost 100 people were evacuated. Later, Hancock Elementary School, which is closer to the scene of the crash, was also put into use as an evacuation site.

== Investigation ==
The NTSB sent eight investigators along with representatives from the plane engine manufacturer and the airframe manufacturer to the crash site on the evening of the crash, intending to recover the wreckage to move it to a secure location on May 24. The team is working to locate a flight recorder from the crash scene. The FAA also initiated an investigation.

In June 2025, the NTSB released its preliminary report on the accident. The report stated that Shapiro was properly qualified for the flight and was aware that the weather data systems at Montgomery Gibbs were disabled. He and the controller also discussed diverting to another airport in case of a missed approach, but did not select an alternate. The aircraft's cockpit voice recorder (CVR) and FADEC units were also recovered.
