= Neither Storm nor Quake nor Fire =

Neither Storm Nor Quake Nor Fire

Studio album by Demise of Eros
- Released: August 22, 2006
- Recorded: 2006
- Genre: Metalcore
- Length: 41:42
- Label: Strike First Records
- Producer: Doug White

Demise of Eros chronology
Another Night of the Same Charade EP (2005)	Neither Storm Nor Quake Nor Fire (2006)

Professional ratings
Review scores
Source	Rating
Cross Rhythms	7/10
Indie Vision Music	4/5 stars

Neither Storm Nor Quake Nor Fire is the only album of metalcore band Demise of Eros. It was released on August 22, 2006.

== Critical reception ==
Josh from Indie Vision Music writes: "The band definitely has talent but need a guiding hand to direct their abilities into a smoother result. As of right now, the potential can be seen, but the band probably wont be able to stand out amongst the hordes of metalcore groups out there. I look at this album the same way I looked at War Of Ages’ debut. You could hear the overflowing potential of WOA but they needed to really clean up their sound and work out a few kinks, which they successfully did. Demise Of Eros, with the same work effort, have the same bright future ahead of them!"

== Track listing ==
No.	Title	Length
1.	"Overtaken"	3:55
2.	"Means To Grasp"	4:12
3.	"Thirst"	4:02
4.	"Engraved On My Palms"	3:53
5.	"Interlude"	1:59
6.	"Reach For The Sky, Punk"	4:19
7.	"Waking Eyes"	3:22
8.	"One Too Many Times"	3:22
9.	"Scream For Me, Brazil!"	2:00
10.	"Truth Unlived"	4:00
11.	"Of The Ages Past (Solaxative)"	6:37
Total length:		41:42

== Credits ==
Demise of Eros

- Darren Belajac - Vocals
- Steve Stout - Guitar, Vocals
- John Erickson - Guitar
- Will Curtis - Bass
- Joey Solak - Drums

Production

- Dave Quiggle - Artwork, Layout Design
- Doug White - Engineer, Producer, Impersonations
