= Dead Throne =

Studio album by The Devil Wears Prada
- Released: September 13, 2011
- Recorded: November 2010 – April 2011
- Studio: Zing Studios, Westfield, Massachusetts; Blacklodge Studios, Eudora, Kansas; The Foundation Recording Studios, Connersville, Indiana
- Genre: Metalcore
- Length: 40:49
- Label: Ferret, Roadrunner
- Producer: Adam Dutkiewicz, The Devil Wears Prada

The Devil Wears Prada chronology
Zombie (2010)	Dead Throne (2011)	Dead & Alive (2012)

Singles from Dead Throne
- 1. "Born to Lose" Released: June 15, 2011; 2. "R.I.T." Released: August 14, 2011; 3. "Mammoth" Released: September 27, 2012

Dead Throne is the fourth studio album by American metalcore band The Devil Wears Prada. It was released on September 13, 2011, through Ferret Music. Produced by Adam Dutkiewicz, the record was recorded in several studios across the United States from November 2010 – April 2011. The album is a follow-up to The Devil Wears Prada's 2009 album, With Roots Above and Branches Below. Much like their previous efforts the album's lyrics were penned by lead vocalist Mike Hranica, whose lyrical direction focused on anti-idolatry concepts. The band's musical style changed after the success of the Zombie EP; this led to the band's decision to fuse the melodic elements of their previous studio albums with the ferocity of Zombie.

== Background and recording ==
The band's previous approach to songwriting, which would involve all band members writing collaboratively, had not been used since Plagues. It is noted by guitarist Chris Rubey that about midway through the writing process of their third full-length With Roots Above and Branches Below, their songwriting style and process changed drastically. Vocalist Mike Hranica stated the album's lyrical themes are based on anti-idolatry. He also said it's the "heaviest and most aggressive album to date."

We aim to give listeners and fans something they can enjoy, but we'll also always make songs we personally stand behind. We'd write differently if we were purely trying to sell albums, that's just not how it works for us. No compromises.

— Mike Hranica

Hranica speaks on the evolution of the band as a whole: "Our early material was dumb, plain and simple, and moving away from that, I think we've grown into smarter, more creative riffs, along with easier to follow songs. It's things like that that mark the evolution of TDWP." The album also features the absence of clean vocal passages on select songs, a songwriting choice the band had not made since their debut. Dead Throne was recorded from November 2010 to April 2011, with the sessions taking place at Zing Studios in Westfield, Massachusetts, Blacklodge Studios in Eudora, Kansas and The Foundation Recording Studios in Connersville, Indiana.

== Composition ==
=== Influences, style and themes ===
Mike Hranica explained that Dead Throne did not need "to sound a certain way throughout." Rhythm guitarist Jeremy DePoyster's clean vocals are still contrasted with a wide array of screamed vocals, which are featured more prominently than clean singing. Lead guitarist and primary songwriter Chris Rubey stated that the musical direction of the album on the Zombie EP was "heavier, more sinister, and zombie-like. Those songs were written pretty much solely by me on my computer and that’s why they sound different. For Dead Throne we wanted to do that and obviously bring in some of the other elements people liked in Plagues.

While Zombie was centrally themed lyrically and musically around a specific topic, Dead Throne conveys a central message with common themes "revolving around idols." Hranica expands when asked about his lyrical themes, which have always been very abstract and metaphorical in order to draw out different meanings depending on the interpreter:

The record is mostly based on idolatry. There's a lot of different lyrical content. It's not a concept record, but a lot of it has to do with anti-idolatry... it's the idea of putting up our idols, heroes, and entities we worship onto a figurative throne. Those things won't stay up there, and they're not meant to be up there. That idea behind Dead Throne is making kings out of things that shouldn't be kings.

Hranica also stated that many of the album's negative themes were inspired from the ending of his five-year relationship.

== Critical reception ==
Professional ratings
Aggregate scores
Source	Rating
Metacritic	(76/100)
Review scores
Source	Rating
AbsolutePunk	90%
Allmusic	3.5/5 stars
Alter The Press!	(1.5/5)
Blare Magazine	4/4 stars
Christian Music Zine	(4.5/5)
Jesus Freak Hideout	4/5 stars
Revolver	3.5/5 stars
Review Rinse Repeat	4/5 stars

The album received generally positive reviews from music critics. At Metacritic, which assigns a normalized rating out of 100 to reviews from mainstream critics, the album received an average score of 76, based on 6 reviews, which indicates "generally favorable reviews". The album was credited for its more experimental and orchestral take on metalcore, and less produced and more violent sound. Ryan Williford of Audiopinions gave the album a 7.5 out of 10 describing the band's choice of producer, Adam Dutkiewicz as a wise move for the band. This is because Williford believes that Joey Sturgis, who produced all of their discography prior to Dead Throne, overproduces his work. He credited the record for its rawer and more natural sound. Drew Beringer of AbsolutePunk also favored Dead Throne for the variety on the record, particularly praising The Devil Wears Prada for their instrumental song "Kansas" and their evolution as songwriters. Jason Lymangrover on a review for Allmusic gave the album three and a half stars out of five, describing it as being "at its most technical and most brutal" and comparing it to "technical metalcore and European symphonic metal."

Wayne Reimer of Jesus Freak Hideout, appreciated the progression from The Devil Wears Prada's third studio album, With Roots Above and Branches Below to Dead Throne as well as crediting the band's drummer, Daniel Williams, for his performance on the record, praising his creativity in the songs and his lack of double bass pedal motions to fill his role. Reimer went as far to say "The tempo fluctuates effortlessly and fluidly throughout each track; this is not to be taken for granted." In Adrian Garza's review for Christian Music Zine (giving 4.5 out of 5) he praises the vocal performance of clean vocalist Jeremy DePoyster and musical development shown on the album: "Jeremy DePoyster has really stepped up his vocal game, the vocals sound so much less produced, in a good way. Aside from the more experimental tracks on the album, there aren’t really any crazy synthesizer sounds, now it’s mostly piano and strings."

Not all reviews were positive, however. Connor O’Brien of Alter the Press! gave the album 1.5 out of five, believing that the album shows no progression for the band, stating: "It seems that TDWP have evolved within their own distinction, yet are left seemingly years behind the rest of the genre." Ryan Williford of Audio Opinions alongside O'Brien sees it as only a "step in the right direction" saying, "Once they start writing something original will be the release that will excite everyone again."

In 2024, John Hill of Loudwire named it the best metalcore album of 2011.

== Commercial performance ==
Dead Throne is their highest charting release, peaking at No. 10 on the Billboard 200, selling 32,420 copies in its first week. It also topped the Billboard Christian Albums and Independent Albums chart, as well as peaking at No. 3 on the Rock Albums Chart and No. 40 on the 2011 Billboard year-end Hard Rock Albums chart. This is the last album to feature James Baney before he left the band on February 22, 2012. There is also a guest vocal appearance by Tim Lambesis on "Constance".

The album has sold 92,000 copies in the U.S.

== Track listing ==
All lyrics are written by Mike Hranica; all music is composed by The Devil Wears Prada.

No.	Title	Length
1.	"Dead Throne"	2:45
2.	"Untidaled"	2:55
3.	"Mammoth"	2:43
4.	"Vengeance"	3:02
5.	"R.I.T."	2:49
6.	"My Questions"	3:12
7.	"Kansas"	3:36
8.	"Born to Lose"	3:05
9.	"Forever Decay"	3:25
10.	"Chicago"	2:45
11.	"Constance"	3:19
12.	"Pretenders"	3:28
13.	"Holdfast"	3:45
Total length:		40:49

Notes

- The instrumental song "Kansas" has a spoken audio sample from Southern Baptist preacher Paul Washer.

== Personnel ==
The Devil Wears Prada

- Mike Hranica – lead vocals, additional guitars
- Chris Rubey – lead guitar, backing vocals
- Jeremy DePoyster – rhythm guitar, clean vocals
- Andy Trick – bass guitar
- James Baney – keyboard, synthesizer, piano
- Daniel Williams – drums

Production

- Produced by The Devil Wears Prada and Adam Dutkiewicz
- Engineered by Adam Dutkiewicz and Jim Fogarty
- Mixed by Adam Dutkiewicz
- Mastered by Tom Baker
- Synthesizer producer, keyboards by Joey Sturgis
- Additional vocal production by Jeremy McKinnon
- Booking by Dave Shapiro of The Agency Group
- Artwork by Dan Seagrave

== Charts ==
Chart performance
Chart (2011)	Peak position
Australian Albums (ARIA)	44
Canadian Albums (Nielsen SoundScan)	66
UK Albums (OCC)	166
UK Rock & Metal Albums (OCC)	8
US Billboard 200	10
US Independent Albums (Billboard)	1
US Indie Store Album Sales (Billboard)	5
US Top Christian Albums (Billboard)	1
US Top Hard Rock Albums (Billboard)	3
US Top Rock Albums (Billboard)	3
