= First Came the Law =

Studio album by Once Nothing
- Released: January 15, 2008
- Recorded: 2007
- Genre: Metalcore
- Length: 58:02
- Label: Solid State
- Producers: Jamie King, Once Nothing

Once Nothing chronology
Earthmover (2007)	First Came the Law (2008)

Professional ratings
Review scores
Source	Rating
DecoyMusic.com	link

First Came the Law is the first studio album by Once Nothing. The album was released on January 15, 2008.

== Track listing ==
1. The Intimidator - 4:11
2. Avoid Me Like the Plague - 4:07
3. Juliet or at Least What's Left of Her - 4:24
4. Gunfire is the Sound of Freedom - 4:44
5. The Dust of a Town - 3:36
6. My Sweet Medusa - 4:07
7. Columbus Wasn't Looking For America - 4:18
8. Then There Were Nine - 4:53
9. All My Heroes Are Cowboys - 4:51
10. The Truth About Me or Someone Like Me - 5:04
11. Whiskey Breath - 5:10
12. ...And Then Came Grace - 8:37

== Personnel ==
- Todd Lowry - vocals
- Josh Branas - rhythm guitar
- Dave Burkes - lead guitar
- Steve Lucarelli - bass
- Giuseppe "Joey" Capolupo - drums
- Recorded, Mixed, and Mastered by Jamie King
- Mastered by Troy Glessner at Spectre
- Art Direction & Design by Jordan Butcher
- Additional vocals Once Nothing, Geoff Jenkins

== Lyrical content ==
-The lyrics on "First Came The Law" are written by Todd. He writes about his personal experiences.

-"Juliet or at Least What's Left Of Her" is about Todd's touring in Alabama. He said he hadn't eaten and was dehydrated and Alabama was extremely hot. He passed out at a BP station.
