= Once Nothing =

American metalcore band

- Origin: Pittsburgh, Pennsylvania, U.S.
- Genres: Metalcore, southern metal, Christian metal
- Years active: 2000–2009, 2010, 2012–present
- Labels: Solid State, CI
- Members: Todd Lowry; Dave Burkes; Josh Branas; Steve Lucarelli; Giuseppe Capolupo
- Past members: Geoff Jenkins; Ryan Carroll; Kevin Hough; Jordan Tomb
- Website: Once Nothing on Facebook

Once Nothing is an American metalcore band from Pittsburgh, Pennsylvania, and was signed to Solid State Records. The band claims to be Christian, but not a "ministry band".

== History ==
Once Nothing was formed in early 2000 by Todd Lowry on vocals, Dave Burkes on bass guitar, Ryan Carroll on guitar and Kevin Hough on drums. Shortly after, guitarist Josh Branas was added and the quintet toured regionally until 2005, when Carroll and Hough left the band. Giuseppe Capolupo, previously of Demise of Eros, replaced Hough on drums. Burkes moved to guitar when Steve Lucarelli was added to the band to take over on bass guitar. The band continued to tour regionally and, in 2006, self-released an EP entitled Voice of the Paragon. They started touring more frequently and, in early 2007, announced they had signed with CI Records. In July 2007, they released another EP entitled Earthmover.

First Came the Law was the band's first and only release on Solid State Records. Released on January 15, 2008, the album was toured on for almost a year, though due to member changes and economic hard times, the band broke up before the end of the year.

In August 2008, Branas decided to leave the band, with guitarist Jordan Tomb taking his place. After several failed tours, bass guitarist Lucarelli and drummer Capolupo decided to leave the band. In February 2009, Lowry announced that the band was done with two farewell shows, one on April 4 at the Sterling Community Center in Sterling, Virginia, (with Kodiak and In Alcatraz 1962) and another on April 5 at Altabar in Pittsburgh, (with The Last Hope, Neocracy, Failure To Fall and Hyperion).

The April 4 concert had Branas and Burkes on guitars for every song, with Tomb playing for a handful. The band played an extra-long set list including "... And Then Came Grace" (one of the few times the song was ever played live) and "How to Build a Sandcastle" (which had not been played for several years). One song, "Whiskey Breath", was taken out of the set list due to noise curfew (despite the previous band, In Alcatraz 1962, having already cut two songs from their own set list to allow Once Nothing one more time).

The April 5 concert had the same line-up, but with the surprise addition of the former guitarist Carroll and the former drummer Hough appearing on "How to Build a Sandcastle".

Once Nothing reunited for two shows at the end of May 2010. On May 29, they played at The Champion Ship, in Harrisburg, with Lorna Shore and local acts. On May 30, they played in Pittsburgh at Altarbar with local acts.

On May 24, 2012, they announced a reformation. The band recorded their EP, The Indiana Sessions in 2013.

The band is coming back in 2016 and playing more shows next year. Due to Capolupo's commitment to The Devil Wears Prada, the band has been on hold. On December 18, 2021, the band performed a Christmas reunion show at Preserving Underground. In 2022 the band announced a "Party Time" reunion show being held at Penn Brewery on Jan 28, featuring opening acts Greywalker, Windchimes, and Casketmaker.

== Members ==
Current

- Todd Lowry – lead vocals (2000–2009, 2012–present)
- David Burkes – lead guitar (2005–2009, 2012–present), rhythm guitar (2000–2002), bass (2000–2005, 2009)
- Josh Branas – rhythm guitar (2002–2008, 2012–present)
- Giuseppe "Joey" Antonio Capolupo – drums (2005–2009, 2012–present) (Gypsy and His Band of Ghosts, Haste the Day, formerly of Demise of Eros)
- Steve Lucarelli – bass (2005–2009, 2012–present) (formerly of Terrible Things)

Former

- Geoff Jenkins – rhythm guitar/backing vocals (2007–2009) (formerly of Gwen Stacy)
- Jordan Tomb – rhythm guitar (2009)
- Ryan Carroll – lead guitar (2000–2005)
- Kevin Hough – drums (2000–2005)

Timeline

== Discography ==
EPs

- ...And the Blood of the Wicked Shall Flow Like a River (2003, self-released)
- A Reckoning (2005, self-released)
- Voice of the Paragon (2006, self-released)
- The City Is Surrounded – 2003–2006 Compilation (2006, self-released)
- Earthmover (2007, CI Records)
- The Indiana Sessions (2013, self-released)

Studio albums

- First Came the Law (2008, Solid State Records)
