= Giuseppe Capolupo =

American drummer

- Also known as: Gypsy; Joey
- Born: Giuseppe Antonio Capolupo
- Origin: Pittsburgh, Pennsylvania, U.S.
- Occupation: Drummer
- Years active: 2003–present
- Member of: Haste the Day Once Nothing The Devil Wears Prada
- Formerly of: Demise of Eros Spinach on Wednesdays Renfield Gypsy and His Band of Ghosts God Alone

Giuseppe Antonio Capolupo is an American drummer who typically performs metalcore. He has been in bands such as Renfield, Demise of Eros, Haste the Day and Once Nothing, as well as formed his own band, Gypsy and His Band of Ghosts. Capolupo joined The Devil Wears Prada as a fill-in drummer, with the eventual plan of becoming an official member.

== Background ==
Capolupo began his musical career in 2003, when he became the rhythm guitarist, and co-vocalist for Renfield. After which, he started to perform drums for Demise of Eros. In 2005, he departed from the band. Following his departure, he joined Once Nothing as their drummer. During the band's initial run, Capolupo recorded on Earthmover and First Came the Law. In 2008, the band disbanded and Capolupo moved to Chicago, to be in a relationship. In December 2008, Capolupo was hired by Haste the Day to perform drums after Devin Chaulk departed from the band. During his tenure with Haste the Day, he recorded on Attack of the Wolf King in 2010. In 2011, the band disbanded and the members went their separate ways. Capolupo formed his own project, Gypsy and His Band of Ghosts, which marked a departure from metalcore and focused on a folk rock style. He recorded an EP, Shortcuts, Backup Plans and Detours, and released it independently. Following the release of the EP, Capolupo reformed Once Nothing in 2012, alongside most of the final lineup and recorded The Indiana Sessions in 2013. In 2014, Haste the Day reunited and began to work on a new album, which came out the following year in 2015, titled Coward.

In 2016, it was announced that Daniel Williams of The Devil Wears Prada was departing from the band and that Capolupo was going to take over. The Devil Wears Prada had played some of their first shows with Demise of Eros and kept in contact with the members, including Capolupo. While Capolupo has not made an official member, He recorded on Transit Blues, the band's most recent release. Following joining the band, he joined vocalist Mike Hranica in his post-punk band, God Alone.

== Influences ==
Capolupo was highly influenced by several drummers, including Jojo Mayer, Thomas Lang, Virgil Donati, Carter Beauford, Akira Jimbo, Benny Greb, Elvin Jones, Tony Williams, and Dennis Chambers.

== Bands ==
Current

- Gypsy and His Band of Ghosts – vocals, lead guitars (2011–present)
- Haste the Day – drums (2008–2011, 2014–2016, 2023–present)
- The Devil Wears Prada – session drums (2016–2019), drums (2019–present)

Hiatus

- Once Nothing – drums (2005–2008, 2012–2016)

Former

- Demise of Eros – drums (2003–2005)

Live and Session

- God Alone – drums, piano (2018–present)

== Discography ==
Demise of Eros

- Demise of Eros (2004)

Once Nothing

- Earthmover (2007)
- First Came the Law (2008)
- The Indiana Sessions (2013)

Haste the Day

- Attack of the Wolf King (2010)
- Haste the Day vs. Haste the Day (2011)
- Coward (2015)
- Dissenter (2026)

Gypsy and His Band of Ghosts

- Shortcuts, Backup Plans and Detours (2012)

The Devil Wears Prada

- Transit Blues (2016)
- The Act (2019)
- ZII (EP) (2021)
- Color Decay (2022)
- Flowers (2025)

God Alone

- Bent Shoulders (2018)
- Milk Drinkers (2018)
