= The Arcanum Order =

Studio album by At the Throne of Judgment
- Released: July 24, 2007
- Recorded: April 2007
- Genre: Melodic death metal; deathcore
- Length: 35:55
- Label: Rise Records
- Producer: Joey Sturgis

At the Throne of Judgment chronology
Demo (2006)	The Arcanum Order (2007)

Professional ratings
Review scores
Source	Rating
Allmusic	3/5 stars
About.com	3.5/5 stars
AbsolutePunk	(84%)

The Arcanum Order is At the Throne of Judgment's first and only album, released on July 24, 2007 on Rise Records. It was recorded and produced by Joey Sturgis of The Foundation Studios in Connersville, Indiana. The lyrics deal with historical events that have happened in the past. Three of the songs on the album were re-recorded versions of songs on their debut demo.

== Track listing ==
1. "Cacophonous" - 1:05
2. "Sentinel" - 3:27
3. "Mariner's Cutlass" - 3:48
4. "Horus Rises" - 3:57
5. "Discarnate by Design" - 4:15
6. "Four Winds" - 1:17
7. "Celestial Scourge" - 3:19
8. "Martyrdom; Ruin of Gaia" - 3:30
9. "Tomb of the Thracians" - 3:03
10. "Delphic Star" - 2:54
11. "The Captive" - 3:49
12. "Outro" - 1:39

== Personnel ==
At the Throne of Judgement

- Eric Kemp - lead vocals
- Brad Weaver - guitars
- Adam McKibben - bass guitar
- James Ruehlmann - guitars
- Roger Hensley - drums

Production

- Produced by Joey Sturgis
