= Space (The Devil Wears Prada EP) =

EP by the Devil Wears Prada
- Released: August 21, 2015
- Genre: Metalcore; space rock
- Length: 19:32
- Label: Rise
- Producer: Dan Korneff

The Devil Wears Prada chronology
8:18 (2013)	Space (2015)	Transit Blues (2016)

Singles from Space
- 1. "Supernova" Released: June 18, 2015; 2. "Alien" Released: August 3, 2015

Space is the second EP by American metalcore band the Devil Wears Prada. The album was released on August 21, 2015, through Rise Records. It is the group's first release without guitarist Chris Rubey. It is also the band's second conceptual release, after the release of their concept EP Zombie EP, in which they embarked on a five-year anniversary tour earlier in 2015. This is the last release by the Devil Wears Prada to feature original drummer Daniel Williams after he departed with the band in July 2016 and later died in 2025.

== Composition ==
Vocalist Mike Hranica described the album as being very "thematic". Brian Leak of Alternative Press referred to the EP's sound as "spacecore".

"Planet A" is about the astronaut Elizabeth, who experiences a malfunction that sets off the events of the EP. "Asteroid" is credited in the album notes as "An Asteroid Towards Earth".

== Promotion and release ==
A music video was released for the track "Planet A", being uploaded to Rise's official YouTube channel on August 20, 2015. The EP was released the next day on August 21, 2015, through Rise Records, the group's first release on the label since 2007's Plagues. Hranica stated that the band felt confident in working with the label again.

Professional ratings
Review scores
Source	Rating
Alternative Press	3.5/5 stars
Exclaim!	6/10
HM	4/5 stars
Loudwire	Positive
Metal Injection	Recommended

== Track listing ==
All tracks are written by the Devil Wears Prada, Kyle Sipress and Jonathon Gering (Excluding "Supernova" which was written by TDWP, Sipress, Gering, and Chris Rubey).

No.	Title	Length
1.	"Planet A"	4:19
2.	"Alien"	2:41
3.	"Moongod"	3:48
4.	"Celestial Mechanics"	1:29
5.	"Supernova"	2:50
6.	"An Asteroid Towards Earth"	4:25
Total length:		19:32

== Personnel ==
The Devil Wears Prada

- Mike Hranica – lead vocals, additional guitars, art direction
- Jeremy DePoyster – guitars, vocals
- Andy Trick – bass
- Daniel Williams – drums

Additional personnel

- Kyle Sipress – additional guitars
- Jonathan Gering – keyboards, synthesizers
- Dan Korneff – engineering, mixing, production
- Ben Wilcox – rehearsals and demo engineering
- Alex Prieto, Matthew Kirby – additional engineering
- Ted Jensen – mastering
- Micah Sedmak – artwork, layout, art direction

== Charts ==
Chart performance for Space
Chart (2015)	Peak position
Australian Albums (ARIA)	47
US Billboard 200	32
US Independent Albums (Billboard)	2
US Top Hard Rock Albums (Billboard)	5
US Top Rock Albums (Billboard)	8
