= Joey Sturgis =

American record producer (born 1985)

- Born: Joseph Alan II Sturgis; January 3, 1985 (age 41); Connersville, Indiana
- Genres: Metal, rock, electronic
- Occupations: Composer, mastering engineer, mixing engineer, producer
- Instruments: Guitar, keyboard, personal computer, vocals, drums
- Years active: 2006–present
- Website: joeysturgis.com

Joey Sturgis (born January 3, 1985) is an American record producer and owner of The Foundation Recording Studio in Connersville, Indiana. Sturgis started recording in 2004 including producing the Asking Alexandria single "The Final Episode" which has gone on to earn an RIAA certified Gold Record. He also received RIAA-certified Gold Records for Asking Alexandria's "Not the American Average", "Moving On" and Of Mice & Men's "Second and Sebring". He has recorded over 100 albums in his career, and was known for doing a majority of the workload by himself in his early years, including engineering, mixing, mastering, and production.

Sturgis is also the founder and president of Joey Sturgis Tones, which are his own line of audio recording plugins. In 2015, he co-founded URM Academy, an online school for rock and metal mixing and production. He also co-founded Drumforge, a drum software program, and Riffhard, which is an online school for guitarists. He also started the Joey Sturgis Forum Podcast, which is now known as the URM Podcast.

== Production discography ==
Joey Sturgis production discography
- Studio albums: 63
- Compilation albums: 6
- EPs: 15
- Remix: 1

=== Studio albums ===
==== 2000s ====
Album	Released	Artist	Credit
Patterns of a Horizon	July 2005	The Devil Wears Prada	Engineer, mixing, producer
Dear Love: A Beautiful Discord	August 22, 2006	The Devil Wears Prada	Engineer, mixing, producer
Why Are We So Dead?	January 23, 2007	Kiss the Gunner	Audio production
Before Their Eyes	May 15, 2007	Before Their Eyes	Audio engineer, audio production
Against the Rest	May 29, 2007	Never Again	Audio engineer, engineer, mastering, mixing
Dear Brothers	July 20, 2007	Death Virginia	Mastering, mixing
The Arcanum Order	July 24, 2007	At the Throne of Judgment	Engineer, mastering, mixing, producer
Plagues	August 21, 2007	The Devil Wears Prada	Audio engineer, audio production, engineer, mastering, mixing, producer
Aun Aprendo	November 13, 2007	Every Bridge Burned	Mastering, mixing, producer
Changes	January 8, 2008	For the Fallen Dreams	Engineer, mastering, mixing, producer
Unbreakable	February 26, 2008	MyChildren MyBride	Audio production, orchestra production, piano programming, producer
Blessed Be Our Ever After	March 4, 2008	Burden of a Day	Engineer, mastering, mixing, producer
Armada on Mercury	March 18, 2008	Kingston Falls	Audio engineer, audio production, composer, mastering, mixing, producer
At Dagger's Drawn	April 29, 2008	Sea of Treachery	Engineer, keyboards, mastering, mixing, producer
Can't Fight Robots	June 24, 2008	Take It Back!	Engineer, mastering, mixing, producer
The Dawn of My Death	October 28, 2008	Before Their Eyes	Audio production, mastering, mixing, producer
Someday Came Suddenly	November 11, 2008	Attack Attack!	Audio engineer, audio production, drum programming, engineer, guitar, mastering, mixing, orchestra production, producer, sound effects
Kingdom of Might	January 6, 2009	Woe of Tyrants	Audio engineer, audio production, composer, engineer, guest artist, mastering, producer
Depravity	March 3, 2009	A Plea for Purging	Engineer, guest artist, mastering, mixing, producer, programming, vocals
Depths	March 10, 2009	Oceano	Engineer, keyboards, mastering, mixing, producer, programming
With Roots Above and Branches Below	May 5, 2009	The Devil Wears Prada	Audio engineer, audio production, engineer, mastering, mixing, producer
Apologies Are for the Weak	June 23, 2009	Miss May I	Audio production, composer, engineer, mastering, mixing, producer
Guardians	July 7, 2009	The Crimson Armada	Audio engineer, audio production, engineer, guest artist, mixing, producer, programming, remastering, sound effects, vocals
A Constant North	July 21, 2009	Rosaline	Producer
Relentless	July 21, 2009	For the Fallen Dreams	Engineer, mastering, mixing, producer
We All Have Demons	September 1, 2009	The Color Morale	Engineer, mastering, mixing, producer
Stand Up and Scream	September 15, 2009	Asking Alexandria	Engineer, mastering, mixing, producer
To Plant a Seed	November 3, 2009	We Came as Romans	Engineer, keyboards, mastering, mixing, producer, programming

==== 2010s ====
Album	Released	Artist	Credit
Untouchable	March 8, 2010	Before Their Eyes	Composer, engineer, instrumentation, mastering, mixing, producer
Of Mice & Men	March 9, 2010	Of Mice & Men	Mastering, mixing, producer
Inspired by the Threat of Failure	April 26, 2010	Us, From Outside	Engineer, mastering, mixing, producer
To Our Forefathers	May 11, 2010	I Am Abomination	Engineer, mastering, mixing, producer
Recover	May 18, 2010	Confide	Engineer, mastering, mixing, producer
Attack Attack!	June 8, 2010	Attack Attack!	Engineer, mastering, mixing, producer
Monument	August 16, 2010	Miss May I	Engineer, mastering, mixing, producer
No Secret Revealed	November 29, 2010	Affiance	Mastering
Speaker of the Dead	February 15, 2011	Emmure	Engineer, mastering, mixing, producer
The End of the World Party	February 22, 2011	I See Stars	Mastering
My Devil in Your Eyes	March 8, 2011	The Color Morale	Engineer, mastering, mixing, producer, vocals
Truth Is...	March 28, 2011	Ten After Two	Mastering
Reckless & Relentless	April 5, 2011	Asking Alexandria	Engineer, mastering, mixing, producer
Great Faith in Fools	May 13, 2011	The Air I Breathe	Mastering, mixing
The Flood	June 14, 2011	Of Mice & Men	Mastering, mixing, producer
Dead Throne	September 13, 2011	The Devil Wears Prada	Keyboards, synthesizer producer
Understanding What We've Grown to Be	September 13, 2011	We Came as Romans	Engineer, keyboards, mastering, mixing, producer, programming
Digital Renegade	March 13, 2012	I See Stars	Engineer, mastering, mixing, producer
Redemption	March 27, 2012	Before Their Eyes	Mastering
Slave to the Game	April 10, 2012	Emmure	Engineer, mastering, mixing, producer
The Future Again	July 17, 2012	A Hero A Fake	Mastering, mixing, producer
Polarities	July 31, 2012	Everyone Dies in Utah	Mastering
Death Is the Only Mortal	October 9, 2012	The Acacia Strain	Mastering
Pardon My French	April 29, 2013	Chunk! No, Captain Chunk!	Engineer, mastering, mixing, producer
Two-Faced Charade	April 30, 2013	Famous Last Words	Foley artists, keyboard engineer, keyboards, mastering, mixing, percussion, percussion engineer, producer
About That Life	June 25, 2013	Attila	Engineer, mastering, mixing, producer, programming, sound design, vocal editing, vocal producer
Yours To Take	July 9, 2013	These Hearts	Mastering
From Death to Destiny	August 5, 2013	Asking Alexandria	Engineer, producer, programming, sound design, vocal engineer, vocal producer
Hollow Bodies	August 19, 2013	Blessthefall	Producer
Tomorrow We Die Alive	August 20, 2013	Born of Osiris	Mastering, mixing
Collapse	September 16, 2013	Dangerkids	Mastering, mixing
What It Means to Be Defeated	October 29, 2013	Dayseeker	Mastering
New Demons	November 22, 2013	I See Stars	Producer
Faceless	March 7, 2014	Buried in Verona	Producer, engineer, mixing, mastering, vocals
Eternal Enemies	April 15, 2014	Emmure	Producer
The Resistance: Rise of The Runaways	July 22, 2014	Crown the Empire	Mastering
Exotype	October 7, 2014	Exotype	Producer, engineer, mixing, mastering
Beating a Dead Horse	May 26, 2015	Jarrod Alonge	Mastering
Metanoia	July 10, 2015	For All Eternity	Mastering
Conquer Divide	July 24, 2015	Conquer Divide	Producer
Fearless	July 24, 2015	Richy Nix	Mixing
Deathless	August 7, 2015	Miss May I	Producer
To Those Left Behind	September 18, 2015	Blessthefall	Producer
The Devil	October 2, 2015	Blue Stahli	Mixing, producer
The Young Souls	October 30, 2015	Myka Relocate	Producer
The Black	March 25, 2016	Asking Alexandria	Producer

=== EPs ===
Album	Released	Artist	Credit
This Is Your Way Out	May 1, 2007	Emarosa	Composer, engineer, lyricist, mastering, mixing, producer
Beyond the Unknown	May 8, 2007	From the Shallows	Audio production
The Second Coming	March 3, 2008	Eli	Producer
Face The Day	August 18, 2008	Callahan	Producer
Don't Even Say A Word	November 4, 2008	Run into The Shadows	Producer
Dreams	December 12, 2008	We Came As Romans	Producer
Jaw Dropper	January 14, 2008	I Am Abomination	Producer
Digital Spaces	August 4, 2009	Let's Get It	Audio production, engineer, mastering, mixing, producer
Now That We're Waiting	August 31, 2009	Settle The Sky	Engineer, mastering, mixing
Zombie	August 24, 2010	The Devil Wears Prada	Engineer, mastering, mixing, producer
The March Ahead	August 11, 2011	The March Ahead	Producer
This Is Just The Beginning…	May 8, 2012	Through Arteries	Producer
Proceedings	June 26, 2012	Tides Will Turn	Mastering

=== Compilations ===
Album	Released	Artist	Credit
Punk Goes Crunk	April 8, 2008	Punk Goes...	Engineer, producer
Punk Goes Pop 2	February 17, 2009	Punk Goes...	Engineer, producer
Punk Goes Pop 3	November 2, 2010	Punk Goes...	Engineer, mixing, producer
Total Breakdown	November 22, 2010	Various artists	Engineer, keyboards, mastering, mixing, producer, programming
The Filthiest Hits...So Far	August 26, 2011	Borgore	Engineer, mastering, mixing, producer
Rise 200	July 30, 2013	Various artists	Engineer

=== Remix ===
Album	Released	Artist	Credit
Stepped Up and Scratched	November 8, 2011	Asking Alexandria	Engineer, mastering, mixing, producer

== Entrepreneurship ==
=== Joey Sturgis Tones ===
Joey Sturgis Tones are audio plugins launched and created by Joey Sturgis. Sturgis began his journey with a background in computer science during high school combined with his ability to pick up any instrument he could get his hands on. This eventually became the catalyst for his passion in audio software creation. He programmed and designed his first plugin, "Gain Reduction" a compression plugin that was praised by producer Chris Lord-Alge at the NAMM Show in 2018. He has also released plugins in collaboration with Howard Benson, Rex Brown of Pantera, Misha Mansoor of Periphery, Jeff Loomis of Arch Enemy, Ben Bruce of Asking Alexandria, multi-platinum country producer Billy Decker and others. His plugins have been used on everything from metal, to country, to pop songs such as 10,000 hours by Dan + Shay and Justin Bieber.

=== Unstoppable Recording Machine ===
URM Academy is an online audio school created by Joey Sturgis, Joel Wanasek and Eyal Levi, which describes itself as "the world's best online music school for rock & metal producers". Through its program Nail The Mix, the platform offers monthly mixing sessions with professionally-recorded songs and livestream commentary from the producer who originally mixed them. The program has featured bands such as Lamb of God, Asking Alexandria, The Devil Wears Prada, Chelsea Grin, Born of Osiris, A Day to Remember, Opeth, Neck Deep, Papa Roach, Meshuggah, Periphery, Gojira, Spiritbox, Angels and Airwaves, Conquer Divide, Knocked Loose, Animals As Leaders etc. and producers such as Tom Lord-Alge, Andrew Wade, Tue Madsen, Devin Townsend, Logan Mader, Jens Bogren, Kane Churko, Machine, Daniel Braunstein, Dave Otero, Will Putney among others. Nail the Mix has won two "2 Comma Club" Awards from ClickFunnels for "entrepreneurs who have used ClickFunnels to grow their business to the 7-figure mark". The platform also offers a podcast, Q&As, lessons ("Fast Track") and, as part of its Enhanced subscription, "Mix Rescue", where students submit their own mixes to be critiqued and cleaned-up during a live broadcast.

=== Drumforge ===
Drumforge is a music software company founded by Joey Sturgis, Joel Wanasek and Joe Wohlitz that provides drum sample libraries and audio plug-ins. The company has released libraries by Taylor Larson, Luke Holland, Daniel Bergstrand, Matt Greiner and others.

=== Riffhard ===
Riffhard is an online guitar school created by Monuments guitarist John Browne, in partnership with URM Academy, and co-owned by Eyal Levi and Joel Wanasek, mainly dedicated to rhythm guitar.

=== Other projects ===
He also started the Joey Sturgis Forums Podcast, now known as the URM Podcast, which was said to "cover a range of music industry topics such as marketing, touring, mixing and producing"

Sturgis has been an active member of The Recording Academy since 2017, advocating for improving the rock and metal categories and encouraging more people to participate.

== Mentorship ==
Over the years, prior to starting URM Academy, Sturgis mentored a handful of up-and-coming producers who eventually gained notoriety, such as Nick Sampson, Nick Scott, Nick Matzkows, Landon Tewers, Johnny Franck and Caleb Shomo of Beartooth. He also mentored two-time Grammy-Nominated Tyler Smyth in his early days. Smyth started the band DangerKids and is now known for his work with I Prevail and Falling in Reverse.
