= Color Decay =

Studio album by The Devil Wears Prada
- Released: September 16, 2022
- Recorded: 2021–2022
- Genre: Metalcore
- Length: 44:30
- Label: Solid State
- Producer: Jonathan Gering

The Devil Wears Prada chronology
ZII (2021)	Color Decay (2022)	Flowers (2025)

Singles from Color Decay
- 1. "Sacrifice" Released: September 29, 2021; 2. "Watchtower" Released: February 3, 2022; 3. "Salt" Released: June 7, 2022; 4. "Time" Released: July 26, 2022; 5. "Broken" Released: September 13, 2022; 6. "Reaching" Released: March 16, 2023; 7. "Ignorance" Released: April 21, 2023

Deluxe edition cover
- Artwork used for the deluxe edition cover.

Color Decay is the eighth studio album by American metalcore band The Devil Wears Prada. It was released on September 16, 2022, through Solid State Records. The album was produced by Jonathan Gering. It is their first album to feature bassist Mason Nagy.

== Background and promotion ==
On September 29, 2021, The Devil Wears Prada released the first single "Sacrifice" along with an accompanying music video. On February 3, 2022, the band unveiled the second single "Watchtower" and its corresponding music video. On June 7, the third single "Salt" was released. At the same time, they announced the album itself, the album cover, the track list, and release date. On July 26, the band released the fourth single "Time" along with a music video. On September 13, three days before the album release, the band published the fifth and final single "Broken". On March 16, 2023, the band released the sixth single "Reaching" while also announcing the deluxe edition of the album which is set to be released on May 5, 2023. At the same time, the band officially revealed the album cover and the track list. On April 21, their seventh single, "Ignorance", was released.

== Critical reception ==
Professional ratings
Review scores
Source	Rating
AllMusic	4/5 stars
Distorted Sound	8/10
HM	4.5/5 stars
Louder Sound	4/5 stars
New Noise	4/5 stars
Rock 'N' Load	9/10
Wall of Sound	6.5/10

Color Decay received generally positive reviews from critics. AllMusic gave the album a positive review saying that "the band firing on all cylinders with a meaty, 12-song set that pairs unrelenting aggression with expansive arrangements and introspective lyrics." Distorted Sound scored the album 8 out of 10 and said: "Ultimately then, even if Color Decay did feel like a bit of a sure thing given the band's recent form, the delivery here is exquisite. This is everything one could ask of a modern metalcore record; hugely melodic and memorable and yet often just as searingly heavy, with all this elevated by an intense emotional resonance, it's yet another home run from a band who have kept in step with the evolution and growth of the genre in a manner that many others could only dream of." John Bacon of HM stated "An emotional work of art, Color Decay is a record for both diehard fans and those who are new to this scene." Louder Sound gave the album a positive review and stated: "After years of solid and consistent evolution, The Devil Wears Prada have nailed a sound that ticks all the boxes: thought-provoking, anthemic and belligerent, Color Decay might just be their finest hour."

New Noise gave the album 4 out of 5 and stated: "While not their best release, they certainly put their best foot forward on Color Decay, delivering many songs that fans expect, and some that they may not. I can't blame a band for trying new ideas and concepts, and The Devil Wears Prada incorporate them in a way that may not work out, but they certainly don't fail with experimenting. This album is heavy and explodes with emotion. It is certainly worth the 40-plus minutes you'll spend listening to it." Rock 'N' Load praised the album saying, "Color Decay is an incredibly strong album from a band that has reached the point in their career where they can have complete control of their sound. They've grown and matured as both musicians and people since their 2006 debut album, and this release is the encapsulation of all that grew into an incredible release filled with crushing instrumentals, great vocals and hope. Give it a spin!" Wall of Sound gave the album a score 6.5/10 and saying: "This album definitely showcases the band's diversity and musicianship. Color Decay can be massively heavy at times, super rock-y at others, and also very slow and melancholic. I think it's going to be divisive amongst fans, with the OGs liking the heavy tracks, and newer fans liking the more rock and melancholic flavoured tracks. Personally, as a fan of heavier music it makes me a little sad that a band that can write such unique and top-tier metal tracks (ala the recent ZII and half the tracks on this album) then writes half an album of mellow rock songs. If it were up to me, they would start a side project for the rock and melancholic tracks and stick to the heavy stuff for The Devil Wears Prada, or switch to EPs and really focusing in on one sound for each."

== Track listing ==
All tracks are written by Jonathan Gering and Mike Hranica, with additional co-writers listed.

Color Decay track listing
No.	Title	Co-writer(s)	Length
1.	"Exhibition"	Kyle Sipress	3:58
2.	"Salt"	Sipress	3:27
3.	"Watchtower"		2:48
4.	"Noise"	Lee Albrecht	3:42
5.	"Broken"	Sipress	3:48
6.	"Sacrifice"		4:07
7.	"Trapped"	Jeremy DePoyster	3:16
8.	"Time"		4:00
9.	"Twenty-Five"	Sipress	3:48
10.	"Fire"	DePoyster	3:36
11.	"Hallucinate"		3:33
12.	"Cancer"		4:23
Total length:			44:30

Deluxe edition bonus disc
No.	Title	Co-writer	Length
1.	"Reaching"	Bobby Lynge	3:25
2.	"Ignorance"	Sipress	3:14
3.	"Salt" (acoustic)	Sipress	3:25
4.	"Broken" (acoustic)	Sipress	3:39
5.	"Sacrifice" (acoustic)		3:16
6.	"Cancer" (acoustic)		3:03
7.	"Watchtower" (live in Anaheim)		2:53
8.	"Salt" (live in Pittsburgh)	Sipress	3:50
9.	"Sacrifice" (Ray Volpe remix)		4:06
10.	"Salt" (Fairlane remix)		3:28
Total length:			34:19

== Personnel ==
Credits adapted from AllMusic.

The Devil Wears Prada

- Mike Hranica – lead vocals, additional guitars
- Kyle Sipress – lead guitar, backing vocals
- Jeremy DePoyster – rhythm guitar, co-lead vocals
- Mason Nagy – bass
- Jonathan Gering – keyboards, synthesizers, programming, backing vocals
- Giuseppe Capolupo – drums

Backing vocalists

- Matt Mantooth and Terrence Vitali – backing vocals
- Juan Pardo – backing vocals

Additional personnel

- Jonathan Gering – production
- Sam Guaiana – additional production
- Alex Prieto – engineering
- Brendan Collins and Sam Madill – engineering assistant
- Matt Mantooth and Terrence Vitali – engineering assistant
- Anthony Salazar – drum technician
- Mike Kalajian – mastering
- Paul Koehler – management
- Matt Andersen and Dave Shapiro – booking
- Adam Skatula – A&R
- Harry Vincent – cover art
- Jim Hughes – layout
- Anthony Barlich – photography
