= ZII =

EP by The Devil Wears Prada
- Released: May 21, 2021
- Genre: Metalcore
- Length: 20:38
- Label: Solid State
- Producer: Mike Hranica; Kyle Sipress; Jeremy DePoyster; Jonathan Gering

The Devil Wears Prada chronology
The Act (2019)	ZII (2021)	Color Decay (2022)

Singles from ZII
- 1. "Termination" Released: April 23, 2021; 2. "Nightfall" Released: May 14, 2021

ZII (or Zombie II) is the third EP by American metalcore band The Devil Wears Prada. The EP, a sequel to 2010's Zombie, was released on May 21, 2021, through Solid State Records and is the band's first release with bassist Mason Nagy.

== Background and promotion ==
On March 31, 2021, the band released a teaser video titled "Upset the Sickness" via Solid State's YouTube channel. The EP was officially announced on April 7, along with the track listing and artwork. Lead vocalist Mike Hranica stated that while Zombie was "about how to fend off the apocalypse," ZII will be about "hopelessness against the horde." Additionally, ZII was inspired by the COVID-19 pandemic.

"Termination" was released as the EP's lead single on April 23. "Nightfall" was released as the second single on May 14. A music video was released for "Forlorn" on May 21, the same day as the EP's release.

In the lead up to the release, the band hosted a livestream on May 15, 2021, which they called an "Undeadstream", where they performed the EP in full.

Professional ratings
Review scores
Source	Rating
AllMusic	3.5/5 stars
Dead Press!	8/10 stars
Distorted Sound	8/10
Metal Injection	4/5 stars
Rock 'N' Load	10/10
Wall of Sound	8.5/10

== Track listing ==
All lyrics are written by Mike Hranica and Jonathan Gering; all music is composed by The Devil Wears Prada.

ZII track listing
No.	Title	Length
1.	"Nightfall"	4:28
2.	"Forlorn"	4:00
3.	"Termination"	3:21
4.	"Nora"	3:54
5.	"Contagion"	4:54
Total length:		20:38

== Personnel ==
The Devil Wears Prada

- Mike Hranica – lead vocals, production
- Kyle Sipress – lead guitar, backing vocals, production
- Jeremy DePoyster – rhythm guitar, clean vocals, production
- Mason Nagy – bass
- Jonathan Gering – keyboards, synthesizer, programming, backing vocals, production
- Giuseppe Capolupo – drums

Production

- Josh Barber – engineering, additional guitar tracking
- Alex Prieto – mixing
- Brendan Collins – mix assistant, digital editing
- Kevin McCombs – additional engineering
- Mike Kalajian – mastering
- Anthony Barlich – photography
- Micah and Luke Seedamk – layout and design

== Charts ==
Chart performance for ZII
Chart (2021)	Peak position
US Billboard 200	110
US Independent Albums (Billboard)	15
US Top Hard Rock Albums (Billboard)	4
US Top Rock Albums (Billboard)	16
