= The Act (album) =

Studio album by The Devil Wears Prada
- Released: October 11, 2019
- Studio: Woolly Mammoth Studios
- Genre: Metalcore; indie rock; hard rock; electronica
- Length: 44:55
- Label: Solid State
- Producer: Sonny DiPerri; The Devil Wears Prada

The Devil Wears Prada chronology
Transit Blues (2016)	The Act (2019)	ZII (2021)

Singles from The Act
- 1. "Lines of Your Hands" Released: August 23, 2019; 2. "Please Say No" Released: September 13, 2019; 3. "Chemical" Released: September 27, 2019

The Act is the seventh studio album by American metalcore band The Devil Wears Prada. It was released on October 11, 2019, through Solid State Records. The album was produced by the band's keyboardist Jonathan Gering. It is the band's final album with founding bassist Andy Trick before his departure in September 2020.

== Composition ==
Vocalist Mike Hranica mentioned the band scrapped 60 songs they had developed before settling with the 12 that make up the album. Hranica stated "We wanted to do something that actually tests the boundaries. You don't see that in rock, and there's so little invention in rock these days." The band was heavily inspired by the album Hiss Spun by Chelsea Wolfe when writing the album.

Professional ratings
Review scores
Source	Rating
AllMusic	4.5/5 stars
Exclaim!	3/5 stars
JesusFreakHideout	4.5/5 stars
Indie Vision Music	5/5 stars
Distorted Sound	4.5/5 stars
KillYourStereo	4/5 stars
HM	3.5/5 stars
Dead Press!	4.5/5 stars

== Track listing ==
All lyrics are written by Mike Hranica & Jonathan Gering; all music is composed by Hranica, Gering and Kyle Sipress, except where noted.

No.	Title	Music	Length
1.	"Switchblade"		2:53
2.	"Lines of Your Hands"		4:10
3.	"Chemical"	Gering; Sipress	3:50
4.	"Wave of Youth"	Jeremy DePoyster; Gering	3:51
5.	"Please Say No"		3:19
6.	"The Thread"	Gering; Hranica	4:48
7.	"Numb"	DePoyster; Gering; Sipress; Hranica	4:21
8.	"Isn't It Strange?"		2:55
9.	"Diamond Lost"	DePoyster; Gering; Sipress; Hranica	3:32
10.	"As Kids"		3:41
11.	"Even Though"		4:05
12.	"Spiderhead"		3:30
Total length:			44:55

== Personnel ==
All credits by AllMusic.

The Devil Wears Prada

- Mike Hranica – lead vocals, additional guitars
- Jeremy DePoyster – clean vocals, rhythm guitar, lead vocals on "Chemical"
- Kyle Sipress – lead guitar, backing vocals
- Andy Trick – bass
- Jonathan Gering – keyboards, synthesizer, programming, backing vocals, production
- Giuseppe Capolupo – drums

Additional musicians

- Sierra Kay – vocals on "Lines of Your Hands"

Additional personnel

- The Devil Wears Prada – production
- Sonny DiPerri – production, mixing
- Tom Baker – mastering
- Luke Sedmak – art design, layout
- Dan Seagrave – paintings

== Charts ==
Charts	Peak position
US Billboard 200	70
US Top Hard Rock Albums (Billboard)	3
US Independent Albums (Billboard)	4
US Top Rock Albums (Billboard)	9
US Christian Albums (Billboard)	3
