= Flowers (The Devil Wears Prada album) =

Studio album by The Devil Wears Prada
- Released: November 14, 2025
- Recorded: 2025 (Note: "Ritual" was recorded and released in 2024, a year before the rest of the album.)
- Genres: Metalcore; post-hardcore
- Length: 42:20
- Label: Solid State
- Producer: Jonathan Gering

The Devil Wears Prada chronology
Color Decay (2022)	Flowers (2025)

Singles from Flowers
- 1. "Ritual" Released: March 8, 2024; 2. "For You" Released: April 22, 2025; 3. "Where the Flowers Never Grow" Released: August 26, 2025; 4. "Wave" Released: August 26, 2025; 5. "So Low" Released: September 14, 2025; 6. "Eyes" Released: October 1, 2025; 7. "Everybody Knows" Released: October 23, 2025; 8. "Cure Me" Released: November 16, 2025; 9. "All Out" Released: March 13, 2026; 10. "When You're Gone" Released: May 19, 2026

Professional ratings
Review scores
Source	Rating
Blabbermouth.net	8.5/10
Distorted Sound	7/10
Kerrang!	3/5
New Noise Magazine	4/5 stars
Wall of Sound	8.5/10

Flowers is the ninth studio album by American metalcore band The Devil Wears Prada. It was released on November 14, 2025, through Solid State Records. It is their final album to feature bassist Mason Nagy, having departed from the band in July 2025 and their first to feature explicit language.

== Background and promotion ==
On March 8, 2024, The Devil Wears Prada released the first single "Ritual". Over a year later, on April 16, 2025, the band unveiled the second single "For You" and its corresponding music video. On August 21, the band released double singles, "Where the Flowers Never Grow" and "Wave", while officially announcing the album itself, the album cover, the track list, and release date. On September 11, the band released the fifth single "So Low" along with a music video. On October 1, the band published the sixth single "Eyes". On October 23, the band released the seventh single "Everybody Knows". Finally, on November 16, two days after the album's release, the eighth single, "Cure Me", was released.

== Composition ==
Flowers shows a more melodic direction for the band than their previous albums, with rhythm guitarist/clean vocalist Jeremy DePoyster having his vocals brought to the forefront in many songs, while a few tracks have the usual screamed vocals from lead vocalist Mike Hranica, such as "All Out," "So Low", and the bonus hidden track "Play the Old Shit". Hranica explained that the band's songwriting process has remained consistent for this album as it had with their earlier ones and "serves the song best. With the songwriting, what the goal is, what the intent is, and when it comes to laying out songs. Whether it's something that I had an instrumental given to me, and I wrote a vocal to it, then [keyboardist Jonathan Gering] and I figure out where Jeremy goes, or Jeremy and Jon wrote something and then I put my part in. It's always very seamless for Jon and I just to be looking at the song and holding a physical piece of paper with the lyrics printed out and say 'that’s Jeremy. That’s the both of us. The bridge is Mike. This and that.'"

DePoyster stated that "Where The Flowers Never Grow" is "about a conceptual place in your mind that’s deserted and barren – no life can grow there. It's the pits of depression and anxiety; the bleak parts of existence. It's the first song on the record, and it was designed that way, introducing the idea that this is what the record is about. It’s about the place I’ve been stuck in since I got home from the best show of my life. The high is gone, and now I have to deal with this." "For You" was written as a "love story unravelling through the eyes of someone hopelessly devoted to a partner who can never truly give back. It’s the sound of desperation meeting blind loyalty – a crushing, cinematic anthem for the heartbroken. This is The Devil Wears Prada at our most expansive, with our biggest chorus to date and a fearless step into the next evolution of our sound. We’re not just pushing boundaries – we’re redefining them."

Hranica wrote "All Out" "about a relationship with someone we both know from our past, feeling like everything was aligned, and then the betrayal of that. The concept is basically, 'Really? I thought we were doing this together, and we're clearly not.' After he wrote it, he read it back and was like, 'I don't know why I wrote that, I just did.'" "Ritual" was written "about the cliché that if you just go along with what you’re supposed to do, everything will be fine. It's a myth, and it's not fine at all. You have to forge your own path. It’s almost like an Orwellian, dystopian computer voice saying, 'Give up on your dreams.' It even speaks to some online communities and comment sections that go, 'Oh, you want to do something new? No, you’re useless. Just recreate the same thing over and over for my pleasure.' It’s like, no, we're human beings with different wants and needs."

== Track listing ==
Flowers track listing
No.	Title	Writer(s)	Length
1.	"That Same Place"	Bobby Lynge; Jonathan Gering	0:58
2.	"Where the Flowers Never Grow"	Lynge; Gering; Jeremy DePoyster	4:27
3.	"Everybody Knows"	DePoyster; Gering; Lucky West	3:19
4.	"So Low"	Dalton Diehl; Kevin Gruft; Mike Hranica; DePoyster	2:59
5.	"For You"	Austin Coupe; Joshua Landry; DePoyster; Gering; Hranica	2:48
6.	"All Out"	Gering; Hranica	3:21
7.	"Ritual"	DePoyster; Gering; Hranica; Tyler Smyth	3:48
8.	"When You're Gone"	DePoyster; Gering; Hranica; Kevin McCombs; Marshall Gallagher	3:36
9.	"The Sky Behind the Rain"	Emma Boster; Gering; Gallagher	1:06
10.	"The Silence"	DePoyster; Gering; Rachel Kanner; Oscar Neidhardt	2:54
11.	"Eyes"	Colin Brittain; DePoyster; Gering; Hranica	4:07
12.	"Cure Me"	Coupe; DePoyster; Gering; Landry; Hranica	2:50
13.	"Wave"	Coupe; DePoyster; Gering; Landry; Hranica	2:48
14.	"My Paradise"	Lynge; DePoyster; Gering; Hranica	3:23
Total length:			42:24

Physical edition bonus hidden track
No.	Title	Writer(s)	Length
15.	"Play the Old Shit"	Lynge; DePoyster; Gering; Hranica	3:50
Total length:			46:14

== Personnel ==
Credits adapted from Tidal.

=== The Devil Wears Prada ===
- Mike Hranica – lead vocals, additional guitars
- Jeremy DePoyster – guitars, backing vocals
- Kyle Sipress - lead guitar (Note: Despite being credited for playing guitar on the album, Kyle Sipress said that he "didn't participate in this record" and was only playing guitar in live performances. Because of this, guitars in the album are mostly performed by Jeremy DePoyster.)
- Mason Nagy – bass
- Jonathan Gering – keyboards, synthesizers, piano, programming
- Giuseppe Capolupo – drums

=== Production ===
- Jonathan Gering – production
- Zakk Cervini – mixing, mastering

== Charts ==
Chart performance for Flowers
Chart (2025)	Peak position
UK Album Downloads (Official Charts)	52
US Top Current Album Sales (Billboard)	37
