= The Devil Wears Prada (band) =

American metalcore band

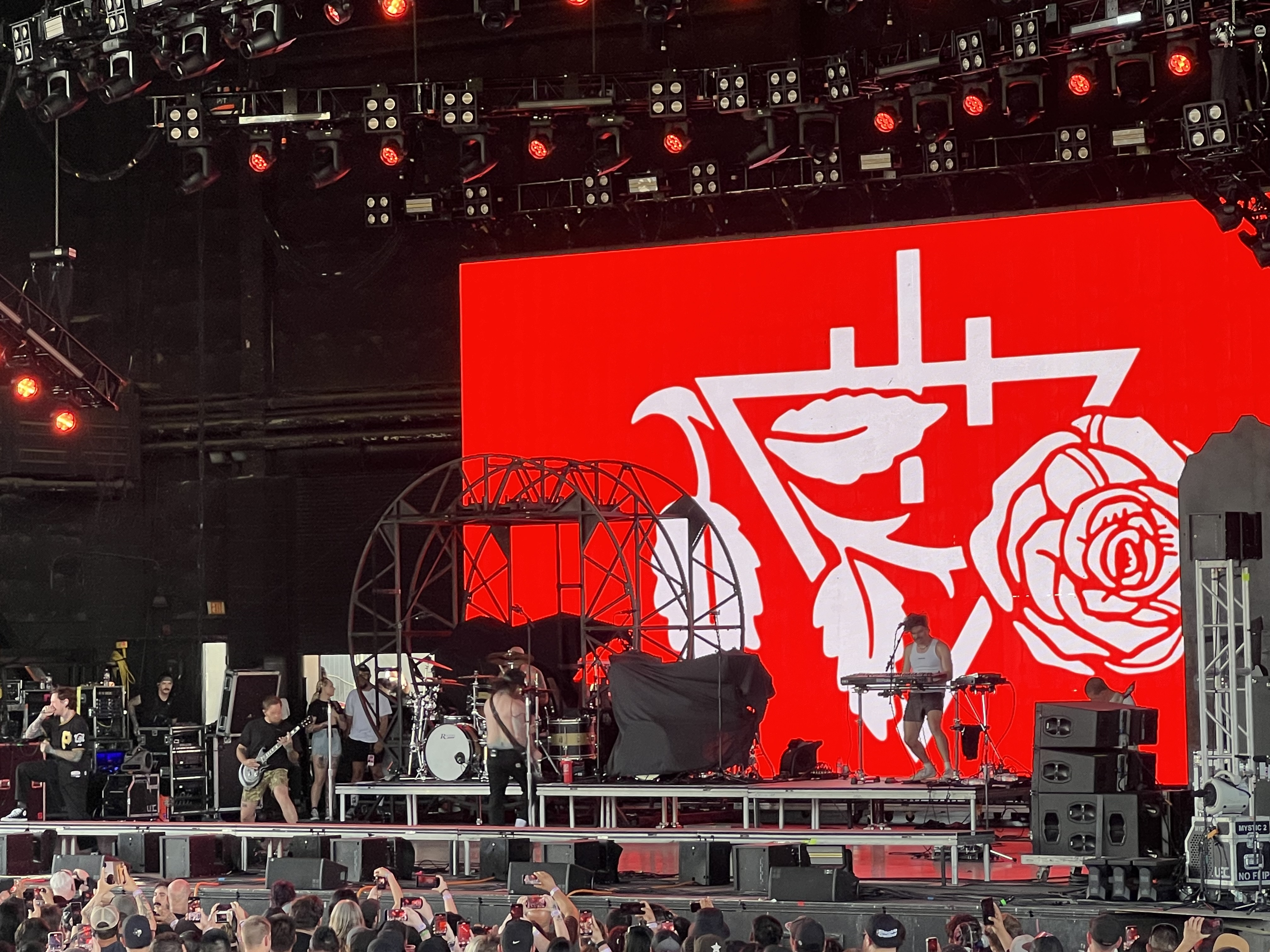
- The Devil Wears Prada performing at a 2025 Summer of Loud event in Phoenix, Arizona

Background information
- Origin: Dayton, Ohio, U.S.
- Genres: Metalcore; screamo; Christian metal (early)
- Years active: 2005–present
- Labels: Rise; Ferret; Warner Music; Roadrunner; Solid State
- Members: Jeremy DePoyster; Mike Hranica; Kyle Sipress; Jonathan Gering; Giuseppe Capolupo
- Past members: James Baney; Chris Rubey; Andy Trick; Daniel Williams; Mason Nagy
- Website: tdwpband.com

The Devil Wears Prada is an American metalcore band from Dayton, Ohio, formed in 2005. They derived their band name from the novel of the same title. At one time known as a Christian metalcore band, it consists of members Mike Hranica (vocals, additional guitar), Jeremy DePoyster (rhythm guitar, vocals), Kyle Sipress (lead guitar, backing vocals), Mason Nagy (bass), Jonathan Gering (keyboards, backing vocals), and Giuseppe Capolupo (drums).

To date, the group has released nine studio albums: Dear Love: A Beautiful Discord (2006), Plagues (2007), With Roots Above and Branches Below (2009), Dead Throne (2011), 8:18 (2013) Transit Blues (2016), The Act (2019), Color Decay (2022), and Flowers (2025).

== History ==
=== Formation and Dear Love: A Beautiful Discord (2005–2006) ===
The Devil Wears Prada was founded during 2005 in Dayton, Ohio; they derived their band name from the story of the same title. Being founded with all Christian members and maintaining a theme that represents their religion, the group played their first show in 2005 with a fill-in bassist and only one guitarist. Rhythm guitarist Jeremy DePoyster and bassist Andy Trick joined the band soon afterward. They continued playing at local areas in Dayton before recording their demo later in the year, which was titled Patterns of a Horizon.

One year after the group recorded their demo and trialed for record labels, Rise Records took the band in with a contract. The band was unsatisfied with the demo, so they re-recorded all of the tracks from the demo for their debut full-length album, Dear Love: A Beautiful Discord. The album was recorded with Joey Sturgis at The Foundation Recording Studio in Connersville, Indiana, and it was released on August 22, 2006. The record's final track features guest vocals courtesy of Cole Wallace, who was formerly part of the band Gwen Stacy. With the release of the album, the band then began touring in multiple areas throughout the country, most notably at 2006's Cornerstone Festival after being recognized as a newer key musical group to Christian metal.

=== Plagues (2007–2008) ===
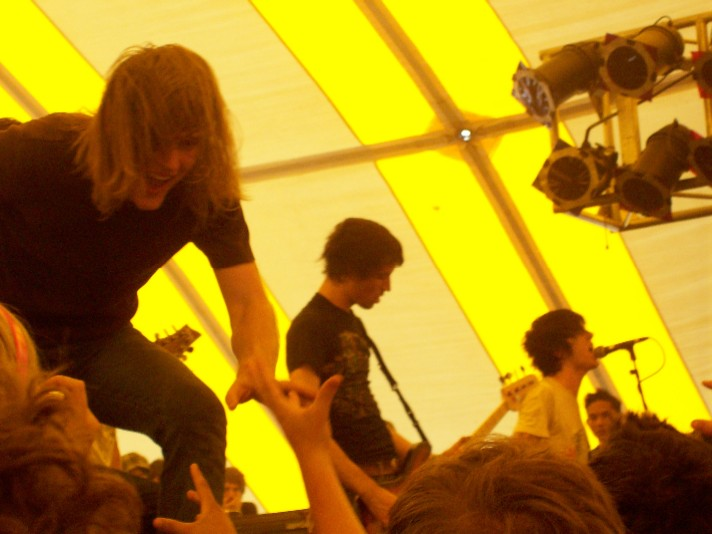
The Devil Wears Prada performing at Cornerstone Festival, a Christian music festival

With Dear Love released at the end of the summer of 2006, The Devil Wears Prada already had songs for their second album prepared by winter of the same year. With a recording duration lasting from that time and leading into spring of 2007, the band's second album, Plagues met its completion by the summer and was released on August 21, 2007. The demo version of their song "HTML Rulez D00d" was placed on the band's Myspace profile on January 1, 2007, for promotion of the record and on July 11, AbsolutePunk began to stream their song "Don't Dink and Drance", which led to further exposure for the band.

The songs from the album "HTML Rulez D00d" and "Hey John, What's Your Name Again?" were released as the album's two singles, both of which spawned music videos that aired on television channels such as MTV and Fuse. Plagues peaked at No. 57 on the Billboard 200 on September 8, 2007, and has been considered a great success since its original release, selling more than 30,000 copies more than their debut album, Dear Love: A Beautiful Discord. It was re-released on October 28, 2008, in a digipak form that includes a DVD in which features the music videos for album's two singles as well as footage of The Devil Wears Prada playing at 2008's Warped Tour and Ultimatour. Later in the year, the band was interviewed by East Coast Romper, and stated that their primary influences were Underoath and Still Remains. The band recorded a cover of the rap song "Still Fly", originally written and performed by Big Tymers, the cover song was released on the compilation album Punk Goes Crunk.

=== With Roots Above and Branches Below (2008–2010) ===
The Devil Wears Prada began writing and recording their third album With Roots Above and Branches Below after attending 2008's Warped Tour. Prior to recording and production of it, vocalist Mike Hranica stated, "Expect a much heavier and more epic record." Keyboardist James Baney also announced that their new album would be more mechanical, but would still contain their same distinct style, whereas drummer Daniel Williams claimed that the new album would be "crazier and wilder" than their previous albums. In autumn 2008, they debuted a song off of the upcoming record while on tour with Underoath, The Famine, Saosin, P.O.S, and Person L. The Devil Wears Prada performed with A Day to Remember, Sky Eats Airplane and Emarosa. They also performed at 2009's Warped Tour to promote the release of With Roots Above and Branches Below. On March 13, the group released a song from the album prior to its release entitled "Dez Moines". Also before the release, the purchaser was given the option to receive several pre-ordered packages. One deal that features the album, a DVD and a shirt also includes a card with a code that let the purchaser download "Dez Moines", and "Assistant to the Regional Manager". The band launched their official website and released With Roots Above and Branches Below both on May 5, 2009. The sales of the album have been very satisfactory, which brought it to position No. 11 on the Billboard 200 for top albums upon its release. The song "Dez Moines" was released as downloadable content for the video game Guitar Hero World Tour on May 7, as well as the song "Hey John, What's Your Name Again?" was released as downloadable content for Rock Band and Rock Band 2 on June 30, 2009.

As well as performing at the main stage of Warped Tour 2009, The Devil Wears Prada played at the iMatter Festival in Elmira, New York. On June 13, they performed the song "Danger: Wildman" for the first time in concert. Vocalist Mike Hranica managed a clothing company called Shipshape Roolz Clothing in which he sponsored and endorsed bands. A fraction of Shipshape's scale money was donated to charities such as Skate 4 Cancer. As of September 29, 2009, the clothing line was shut down and its online store changed its name to Traditiona, due to "legal issues". From November 23 to December 21, 2009, the band toured with All That Remains and from February 4 to March 21, 2010, they were included on a tour headlined by Killswitch Engage and opened by Dark Tranquillity.

At the beginning of 2010, it was announced that The Devil Wears Prada were voted as 2009's Band of the Year by readers of Alternative Press and appeared on the cover. On February 12, 2010, the group confirmed the production for the "Assistant to the Regional Manager" music video, this led to its release on April 6, 2010, where it was premiered on Headbangers Ball.

=== Zombie EP and Dead Throne (2010–2013) ===
In an interview at the beginning of April with Lucy Alberts of Alternative Press, the band revealed that they were recording an EP before they begin their Back to the Roots Tour. The EP was described as a "fun" release with "brutal" songs in the vein of what will eventually become the band's forthcoming studio album. The band's Back to the Roots Tour was presented by Rockstar. Mike Hranica stated, "One of the primary elements of the Back to the Roots Tour is playing a few Dear Love songs that we have not played in a long time, and probably will not play again or anytime soon." On June 11, it was announced that they have completed the recording of the EP, the title for it was revealed as being Zombie and was released on August 23. After the completion and announcement of the EP, the band began their Back to the Roots Tour on June 25 as they planned.

By January 2011, Hranica revealed in an interview with Tim Karan what the band's ideas and plans for their fourth full-length studio album would be. His comments were placed within comparison to their latest release (the Zombie EP and described that the record is "a more heavy-focused sound from us. We think it would be smart to push that beefy, heavy songwriting [from Zombie] into the new full-length...but with a strong blend of what we usually do with melody." The album was confirmed to not be a concept album — like their previous work on the Zombie EP — but would have an overall theme, focused on anti-idolatry, which, according to Hranica, "has been weighing on me lately."

The album's name was revealed to be Dead Throne, and was released on September 13, 2011, through Ferret Music. It has since become a critical and commercial success, where it peaked at number 10 on the Billboard 200, selling 32,420 copies within its first week. Dead Throne also topped the Christian and Independent album charts, as well as peaking at number 3 on the Rock and Hard Rock album charts.

The band was confirmed for the Mayhem Festival tour at the beginning of 2012, with Slayer, Slipknot and As I Lay Dying. During this tour on February 22, 2012, keyboard player James Baney left the band. The band released a CD/DVD album titled Dead and Alive on June 26, 2012.

=== 8:18 (2013–2015) ===
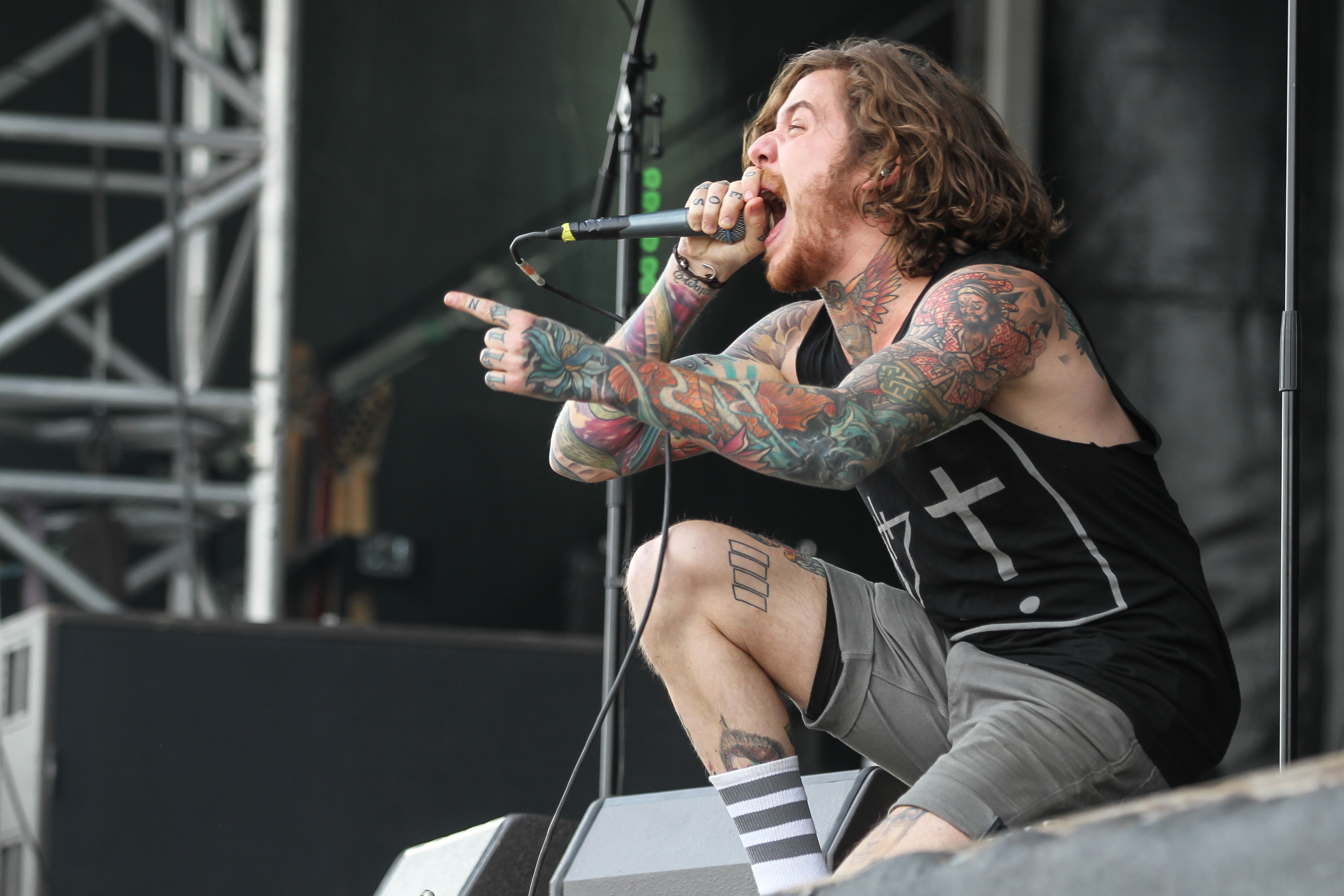
Vocalist Mike Hranica in 2013

On January 25, 2012, Mike Hranica announced in an interview with Noisecreep that the band was working on their fifth album and that the album would be darker than Dead Throne and lyrically more sad and miserable. Hranica also stated that guitarist Chris Rubey has come up with material that is absolutely relentless. Hranica went on to comment that he is very excited on the keyboard parts they've been working on since James Baney's departure, describing them as "very dark and intense".

On February 20, 2013, the band announced that guitarist Chris Rubey missed the band's immediate touring with As I Lay Dying to tend to his newborn child. Samuel Penner of For Today and In the Midst of Lions was Rubey's temporary replacement.

It was revealed on the band's Facebook that the title of the new album would be 8:18, which was released on September 17, 2013.

=== Label changes, line-up instability and Transit Blues (2015–2018) ===
On March 7, 2015, the band resigned to Rise Records. Ten days later, they announced the departure of founding guitarist Chris Rubey, and that they will be releasing a new EP titled Space. The band will also be releasing a 7" vinyl on Record Store Day titled South of the City via Atlantic/Roadrunner. On March 14, the band embarked on a tour for the five-year anniversary of their EP Zombie. The band performed "Supernova", a song off Space, and released it on June 18; this was followed by another song, titled "Alien", on August 4. Before the EP was released, Hranica announced they had a new guitarist named Kyle Sipress, the band's former guitar tech. The Space EP itself was released on August 21. On July 2, 2016, the band parted ways with drummer Daniel Williams.

July 18, 2016, Giuseppe Capolupo, drummer of Demise of Eros, Haste the Day and Once Nothing, stated he had recorded on Transit Blues. The band's sixth studio album Transit Blues was released October 7, 2016. When asked about adding Giuseppe Capolupo as an official member, Hranica stated, "I totally perceive it being a permanent replacement if things go well." In 2017, the band embarked on a tour with Anthrax and Killswitch Engage, called the "Killthrax Tour". On September 24, 2018, they signed with Solid State Records.

=== New releases, death of Daniel Williams, and Mason Nagy's departure (2019–present) ===
In 2019, Gering and Capolupo joined the band as official members. They proceeded to join in recording their new album, with Gering providing songwriting and production duties, alongside producer Sonny DiPerri.

On September 23, 2020, the band released an episode of their podcast (The Prada Pod) in which they discussed bassist Andy Trick's departure from the band and his replacement, former touring bassist Mason Nagy. On April 7, 2021, the name, artwork, and track listing for a new EP, ZII, were announced. A sequel to 2010's Zombie, it is about hopelessness and was partially inspired by the COVID-19 pandemic.

On June 7, 2022, the band announced that their eighth studio album Color Decay would be released on September 16.

On March 4, 2024, the band released the song "Ritual". On April 18, 2025, the band released another single, "For You". The band performed at the Sonic Temple music festival in Columbus, Ohio the following month in May.

On May 22, 2025, founding drummer Daniel Williams was killed in a private plane crash in San Diego. The band confirmed his death later that day in a statement, saying: "No words. We owe you everything. Love you forever." Jeremy DePoyster said: "This hurts really bad. Rest easy boys. I love you. We’ll see each other again." Hours prior to the crash, Williams had posted pictures of himself in the cockpit of the plane to Instagram. One of the captions read: "Hey. Hey... you... Look at me... I’m the (co)pilot now." Despite this, Williams's father confirmed that he did not hold a pilot's license and was not piloting the plane. The plane was owned by Sum 41 agent Dave Shapiro, who was also killed in the crash. The resulting fires resulted in the evacuation of approximately 100 residents in the area, and authorities said it was a "miracle" that no fatalities occurred on the ground. A week prior to his death, Williams had accepted a position at Apple Inc. after eight years of working for GoPro.

On July 31, 2025, bassist Mason Nagy announced he had departed the band.

On August 21, 2025, the band released double singles, "Where The Flowers Never Grow" and "Wave", while officially announcing their ninth album called Flowers which was released on November 14, 2025.

The band announced their first UK headlining tour in December 2025. They also announced the Flowers Spring 2026 US headlining tour, with support from Four Year Strong, Split Chain, and I Promised the World.

In June 2026, the band rereleased 2005 demo Patterns of a Horizon on cassette in collaboration with Fantasy Initiative, a multidiscliplinary art publisher based in Columbus, Ohio.

== Musical style, themes and influences ==
In their early years, the band and their works were described by some sources as metalcore, screamo Christian hardcore, and Christian metal. Additionally, Loudwire stated that the band has also been classified under several other "all-encompassing" labels such as "myspace-core" and "scene-core," due to the band's popularity with listeners who the publication described as "the scene kids of Myspace." They were among the first prominent metalcore bands to incorporate electronic elements into their music in the 2000s.

According to Audio Ink Radio, "by fusing the finest elements of American metal-core and European melodic metal, Dayton, Ohio's the Devil Wears Prada are living the heavy music dream: delivering metal with a slight facelift to the next generation of headbangers." The band members' beliefs, and the themes in their music, also led to their genre being described as "Christian metalcore".. Their early lyrical themes were based around Christianity, with their fourth album, Dead Throne, following a theme based mostly around anti-idolatry. Their EPs Zombie and ZII were based around a zombie apocalypse, while Space was about an astronaut in space. Later themes include romance, heartbreak, depression, grief, and other personal themes. Mike Hranica has been widely praised for his poetic lyrics.

Despite speculations that the band named themselves after the film of the same title, the band was in actuality formed before the film was released. They have explained that their band name is based on an anti-materialistic mindset and derived their name from the novel The Devil Wears Prada. At the time of naming the band, the members assumed that the novel included anti-materialism as its moral, until later discovering that the novel did not feature this as its message at all. Despite making this mistake, the band members refused to change the name and decided that they would create a new, non-materialistic definition indicating that at the Last Judgment, God will not look at people's possessions.

In 2021, Sipress stated in a Reddit AMA in response to a question as to whether they still considered their music to be Christian-based that "we have not promoted the band a [sic] being Christian for a looong time. Most of us aren't Christians, but we do aim at writing music that is fun to play!".

The Devil Wears Prada have cited influences including As I Lay Dying, Underoath, Norma Jean, Slayer, Metallica, Pantera, Van Halen, Killswitch Engage, the Bled, Fugazi, Linkin Park, Black Flag and Minor Threat. On With Roots Above and Branches Below (2009), they began to take influences from Meshuggah, Born of Osiris, Slipknot and Darkest Hour.

== Band members ==
Current

- Jeremy DePoyster – rhythm guitar, co-lead vocals (2005–present)
- Mike Hranica – lead vocals (2005–present); additional guitars (2011–present)
- Kyle Sipress – lead guitar, backing vocals (2015–present)
- Jonathan Gering – keyboards, synthesizers, programming, backing vocals (2019–present; session musician 2012–2019)
- Giuseppe Capolupo – drums (2019–present; session musician 2016–2019)

Former

- James Baney – keyboards, synthesizers, programming (2005–2012)
- Chris Rubey – lead guitar (2005–2015); backing vocals (2011–2015)
- Daniel Williams – drums (2005–2016; died 2025)
- Andy Trick – bass (2005–2019)
- Mason Nagy – bass (2019–2025; session musician 2018)

Former touring musicians

- Samuel Penner – lead guitar (2013)

Timeline

== Discography ==
Studio albums

- Dear Love: A Beautiful Discord (2006)
- Plagues (2007)
- With Roots Above and Branches Below (2009)
- Dead Throne (2011)
- 8:18 (2013)
- Transit Blues (2016)
- The Act (2019)
- Color Decay (2022)
- Flowers (2025)
