= 8:18 =

Studio album by The Devil Wears Prada
- Released: September 17, 2013
- Studios: Glow in the Dark Studios, Atlanta, Georgia and Zing Studios, Westfield, Massachusetts
- Genre: Metalcore
- Length: 43:39
- Label: Roadrunner
- Producers: Matt Goldman, Adam Dutkiewicz

The Devil Wears Prada chronology
Dead & Alive (2012)	8:18 (2013)	Space (2015)

Singles from 8:18
- 1. "Martyrs" Released: July 30, 2013; 2. "Home for Grave" Released: July 30, 2013; 3. "First Sight" Released: August 29, 2013; 4. "Sailor's Prayer" Released: June 12, 2014; 5. "War" Released: December 17, 2014

8:18 is the fifth studio album by American metalcore band The Devil Wears Prada. The album was released on September 17, 2013, through Roadrunner Records. It is the first album without founding keyboardist James Baney, and the final album with founding members Chris Rubey and Daniel Williams. It topped the Christian charts and came in at No. 20 and No. 6 on the Billboard 200 and rock charts respectively, selling 16,000 copies in the first week.

== Composition ==
The band maintains their metalcore sound throughout the album, although the track "Care More" has industrial influence. Artist Direct has also noted sounds influenced by hardcore punk and heavy metal, and Ultimate Guitar described the album as melodic metalcore. The title is an allusion to Romans 8:18.

== Critical reception ==
Professional ratings
Review scores
Source	Rating
About.com	4/5 stars
Allmusic	3.5/5 stars
Alternative Press	4/5 stars
HM	4/5 stars
Melodic	3.5/5 stars

At Alternative Press, Scott Heisel proclaimed it to be an excellently "solid record". At HM, they affirmed this was "a refreshing work of self-awareness". Alternative Press premiered the album in its entirety via their website on September 10, 2013 to promote the release. Allmusic's Jason Lymangrover said the songs were "more visceral and accomplished than prior outings" and called the title track, Care More, and In Heart as the Allmusic track picks.

== Commercial performance ==
The album was also released in high resolution (48 kHz/24bit) on HDtracks.com. In its first week of release, the album debuted at No. 20 on the Billboard 200, No. 1 on Top Christian Albums chart and No. 6 on the Top Rock Albums chart, selling 16,000 copies. It also came in at No. 2 on the hard rock charts behind Avenged Sevenfold's Hail to the King. In its second week, the album fell to No. 105 on the Billboard 200, selling 3,000 copies and its third week, the album fell to No. 169 and sold 2,000 copies. As of October 2016, the album has sold 50,000 copies in the US.

== Track listing ==
No.	Title	Length
1.	"Gloom"	3:45
2.	"Rumors"	3:02
3.	"First Sight"	3:34
4.	"War"	3:02
5.	"8:18"	2:13
6.	"Sailor's Prayer"	3:52
7.	"Care More"	3:15
8.	"Martyrs"	3:28
9.	"Black & Blue"	3:48
10.	"Transgress"	3:35
11.	"Number Eleven"	3:15
12.	"Home for Grave"	3:25
13.	"In Heart"	3:27
Total length:		43:39

Japanese bonus tracks
No.	Title	Length
14.	"Sailor's Prayer" (Chris Rubey Remix)	3:23
15.	"Number Eleven" (Jonathan Gering Remix)	3:45

== Personnel ==
The Devil Wears Prada

- Daniel Williams – drums
- Andy Trick – bass guitar
- Chris Rubey – lead guitar, backing vocals
- Jeremy DePoyster – clean vocals, rhythm guitar, lead vocals and piano on "Care More"
- Mike Hranica – lead vocals, additional guitars

Production

- Produced by Matt Goldman & Adam Dutkiewicz, at Glow in the Dark Dark Studios, Atlanta, Georgia and Zing Studios, Westfield, Massachusetts
- Engineered by Matt Goldman & Matt McClellan
- Mixed by Dan Korneff
- Mastered by Ted Jensen
- Keyboards and synthesizer by Jonathan Gering
- A&R by Dave Rath
- Management by Chris Brown, Randy Dease, Mark Mercado & John Youngman (Fly South Music Group)
- Booking by Dave Shapiro & Tom Taaffe (The Agency Group)
- Art direction by Mike Hranica
- Design & layout by Micah Sedmak
- Cover art & photo by Daniel Hojnacki

== Charts ==
Chart (2013)	Peak position
UK Rock & Metal Albums (Official Charts)	17
US Billboard 200	20
US Top Christian Albums (Billboard)	1
US Top Hard Rock Albums (Billboard)	2
US Top Rock Albums (Billboard)	6
US Indie Store Album Sales (Billboard)	20
