= Demise of Eros =

American metalcore band

- Origin: Pittsburgh, Pennsylvania, United States
- Genres: Metalcore, Christian metal
- Years active: 2003–2006
- Label: Strike First Records
- Past members: Darren Belajac; Steve Stout; John Erickson; Will Curtis; Joey Solak; Chris Urbanek; Giuseppe Capolupo

Demise of Eros was a metalcore band from Pittsburgh, Pennsylvania that formed in late 2003. The band signed to Strike First Records, a subsidiary of Facedown Records. The band disbanded in 2006.

== Biography ==
The band formed with Vocalist Darren Belajac, Guitarists John Ericson and Steve Stout, Bassist Chris Urbanek, and Drummer Giuseppe "Gypsy" Capolupo.

The band signed to Strike First Records and released their first album Neither Storm Nor Quake Nor Fire on August 22, 2006.

They were named one of The Daily News in Tune Magazine's "IT Bands" of 2005, were declared by WXDX FM 105.9 as "the best metal band ever to come out of Pittsburgh", and toured with notable acts such as War of Ages, Twelve Gauge Valentine, Unearth, Terror, Haste the Day, Remembering Never, The Acacia Strain, God Forbid, Bury Your Dead, August Burns Red, and Symphony in Peril.

The band disbanded in late 2006, citing that many of them did not want to tour for the rest of their lives and that "This decision had not been reached due to any personal antipathy on anyone's part."

== Name ==
Contrary to what one may believe, Demise of Eros does not mean 'the death of love.' As stated on their Myspace and Purevolume:

"In Greek mythology, Eros is the god of romantic love. "This god can all too often serve as something like an idol in peoples' lives," Darren said. "Eros leads us to believe that it is the ultimate good in human life. Sometimes overtly, and almost always subconsciously, our culture praises this love as that which will bring ultimate happiness and fulfillment. But the god becomes a demon if it doesn't submit to Love Himself. Romantic love is great, but it has to keep its place in the scale of loves.

Therefore, Demise of Eros is not the desire for the abolition of romantic love. Rather, their music is the artistic representation of what's possible if this idol is not allowed to keep us from the love that can make us the kind of people we are meant to be and the kinds of people the worlds needs for change. While band members don't seek to impose their intellectual will on anyone, they simply hope to open a new avenue of thinking."

== Members ==
Last Known Line-up

- Darren Belajac – vocals (2003–2006)
- Will Curtis – bass (2006)
- Joey Solak – drums (2005–2006)

Former Members

- Chris Urbanek – bass (2003–2006)
- Giuseppe Capolupo – drums (2003–2005)
- Steve Stout – lead guitar, backing vocals (2003–2006)
- John Erickson – rhythm guitar (2003–2006)

Touring Members

- Chris Arnold – lead guitar, backing vocals (2006)
- Joel Cunningham – rhythm guitar (2006)

Timeline

== Discography ==
EPs

- Demise of Eros EP (2004)
- Another Night of the Same Charade EP (2005)

Studio albums

- Neither Storm Nor Quake Nor Fire (2006)
