= Dear Love: A Beautiful Discord =

Studio album by The Devil Wears Prada
- Released: August 22, 2006
- Studio: The Foundation Recording Studios, Connersville, Indiana
- Genre: Metalcore; Christian metal
- Length: 39:55
- Label: Rise
- Producer: Joey Sturgis

The Devil Wears Prada chronology
Patterns of a Horizon (2005)	Dear Love: A Beautiful Discord (2006)	Plagues (2007)

Professional ratings
Review scores
Source	Rating
Absolute Punk	(90%)
AllMusic	3.5/5 stars
Jesus Freak Hideout	4/5 stars

Dear Love: A Beautiful Discord is the debut studio album by American metalcore band The Devil Wears Prada. It was released on August 22, 2006 through Rise Records. The album includes re-recorded versions of all tracks from the band's demo Patterns of a Horizon, and two original tracks, "Texas is South" and "Dogs Can Grow Beards All Over".

Stewart Mason of Allmusic described The Devil Wears Prada as "fairly wide-ranging in its influences", in their take on the metalcore genre, comparing James Baney's keys to European symphonic metal, while describing Jeremy DePoyster's clean vocals as emo-tinged. He also remarked the album's sound and arrangements to be an improvement over the debut, rendering the demo only essential for "completists".

== Track listing ==
All lyrics are written by Mike Hranica; all music is composed by The Devil Wears Prada.

No.	Title	Length
1.	"The Ascent"	1:10
2.	"Gauntlet of Solitude"	2:42
3.	"Dogs Can Grow Beards All Over"	3:29
4.	"And the Sentence Trails Off..."	4:13
5.	"Rosemary Had an Accident"	5:10
6.	"Redemption"	0:52
7.	"Swords, Dragons & Diet Coke"	4:06
8.	"Who Speaks Spanish, Colon Quesadilla"	3:58
9.	"Texas Is South"	6:08
10.	"Modeify the Pronunciation"	4:35
11.	"Salvation"	3:36
Total length:		39:55

== Personnel ==
The Devil Wears Prada

- Mike Hranica – lead vocals
- Chris Rubey – lead guitar
- Jeremy DePoyster – rhythm guitar, clean vocals
- Andy Trick – bass guitar
- James Baney – keyboards, synthesizer, additional clean vocals on "Swords, Dragons & Diet Coke"
- Daniel Williams – drums

Production

- Kris Crummett – mastering
- Joey Sturgis – producer, engineer, mixing
- Brad Filip – design, layout design
