= Zombie (EP) =

EP by the Devil Wears Prada
- Released: August 23, 2010
- Recorded: May–June 2010
- Studio: Foundation Recording Studio
- Genre: Metalcore
- Length: 22:50
- Label: Ferret
- Producer: Joey Sturgis

The Devil Wears Prada chronology
With Roots Above and Branches Below (2009)	Zombie (2010)	Dead Throne (2011)

Zombie is the first EP by American metalcore band the Devil Wears Prada. It was released on August 23, 2010. The band announced they would tour in support of the EP's five year anniversary, where they will play the EP in its entirety.

A sequel EP, titled ZII, was released on May 21, 2021.

== Background and recording ==
The planning and writing for Zombie began before the summer of 2010. In June it was confirmed that the recording of it was completed and the band then thereafter embarked on their Back to the Roots Tour. Upon its original announcement, frontman Mike Hranica described it as being a "fun" release with "brutal" songs. Its general concept concerns the story of a relentless zombie apocalypse due to Hranica's strong interest on the subject.

== Composition ==
The band's metalcore musical style evolved considerably after the release of With Roots Above and Branches Below. Taking note of the EP's speedier approach, The Devil Wears Prada stated that Zombie has the "fastest music they've ever written" and even admitted that it draws a strong influence from the likes of Slayer and Hatebreed. It is also the first release by the band that does not feature humorous song titles.

== Critical reception ==
Professional ratings
Review scores
Source	Rating
AbsolutePunk	(88%)
AllMusic	3.5/5 stars
Audio Opinions	4.5/5 stars
Blare Magazine	4/5 stars
Double Dance	4.5/5 stars
Jesus Freak Hideout	4.5/5 stars
Ultimate Guitar Archive	(8.1/10)

Critically, reception to Zombie has been met with positive reviews and ratings. Upon the EP's release, it debuted at number 10 on the Billboard 200 and number 2 on the Independent Albums. The EP was praised for its notice of the band's overall performance along with many critics enjoying its concept.

AllMusic praised the group's musicianship expressing enjoyment over the array of influenced entwined with the EP's eerie concept. Dom Wyatt of Dead Press! stated "[The EP] kind of takes me back a good five or six years in the underground metal scene where it was commonplace to use movie sound bites mid-song, albeit this time they use a feigned public service announcement at the start of track three, ‘Outnumbered’. The main track that stands-out is ‘Anatomy’, if not for the vicious breakdown but for the opening riff with the synth intertwined."

== Track listing ==
All lyrics are written by Mike Hranica; all music is composed by The Devil Wears Prada.

No.	Title	Length
1.	"Escape"	4:45
2.	"Anatomy"	3:46
3.	"Outnumbered"	4:54
4.	"Revive"	4:53
5.	"Survivor"	4:32
Total length:		22:50

== Personnel ==
Credits for Zombie EP adapted from AllMusic.

The Devil Wears Prada

- Mike Hranica – lead vocals
- Chris Rubey – lead guitar
- Jeremy DePoyster – rhythm guitar, clean vocals
- Andy Trick – bass
- James Baney – synthesisers, keyboards
- Daniel Williams – drums

Production

- Joey Sturgis – production, engineering, mastering, mixing
- Tim Brennan – A&R
- Adam Elmakias – photography
- Sons of Nero – layout
- Eric Rushing – management
- Dave Shapiro – booking

== Charts ==
Chart (2010)	Peak position
Billboard 200	10
Billboard Digital Albums	10
Billboard Independent Albums	2
Billboard Rock Albums	2
