= With Roots Above and Branches Below =

Studio album by the Devil Wears Prada
- Released: May 5, 2009
- Recorded: January – March 2009
- Studio: The Foundation Recording Studios, Connersville, Indiana
- Genre: Metalcore
- Length: 40:17
- Label: Ferret
- Producer: Joey Sturgis

The Devil Wears Prada chronology
Plagues (2007)	With Roots Above and Branches Below (2009)	Zombie (2010)

With Roots Above and Branches Below is the third studio album by American metalcore band the Devil Wears Prada. The album was released on May 5, 2009, through Ferret Music. It charted at No. 11 on the Billboard 200, selling 31,000 in its first week.

With Roots Above and Branches Below is now considered a landmark in the metalcore genre. Alternative Press Magazine said the album was "the epitome of 2009 metalcore". Many later bands would emulate the album's sound. Revolver stated that "at the time, nothing else sounded quite like it — and then everything did."

== Background and recording ==
The Devil Wears Prada began writing for With Roots Above And Branches Below after attending 2008's Warped Tour. They started performing "I Hate Buffering" for live audiences for the remainder of the tours they were on that year. They began production and recording of the album during early 2009, while so, vocalist Mike Hranica stated "We're really excited for this album. It's definitely going to be darker, heavier, and more epic. Expect a much heavier, more metal record." Drummer Daniel Williams stated that the new album would be "wilder and crazier" with songs that would features new elements such as choruses, and James Baney stated that the album would be more mechanical, but that it would still contain their same distinct style.

== Music and lyrics ==
Revolver said that the music on With Roots Above and Branches Below is "way fucking heavier" than the music on Plagues. The album's style is considered to be "darker" than on previous releases. Alternative Press categorized the album as metalcore and scene music.

Some of the album's song titles contain apparently random references to things like Scientology and the US sitcom The Office. AllMusic opined that the song titles gave the impression that the songs themselves "aren't really about anything."

== Promotion and release ==
The first material released from the album was the song "Dez Moines". It was uploaded to the band's MySpace profile on March 13, 2009, and was released as a free download for fans. On the band's co-headlining US tour with A Day to Remember, Emarosa and Sky Eats Airplane, they offered fans special download cards for the songs "Dez Moines" and "Assistant to the Regional Manager".

"Dez Moines" is also available as downloadable content for the video game Guitar Hero World Tour and was released on May 7, 2009, as a part of the Ferret/Metal Blade Records Pack.

With Roots Above and Branches Below was released on May 5, 2009, through Ferret Music. The album was released in two editions; a standard version and a deluxe CD/DVD version. The deluxe CD/DVD includes the disc and a DVD that contains a making of the album that also premiered online. There are some clips that were deleted after being presented for a short time online that are also featured on the DVD. The album cover artwork was illustrated by Dan Seagrave, who is well known for his work for metal acts including Morbid Angel, Suffocation and Demon Hunter.

The music video for the song "Danger: Wildman" was released on August 4, 2009, and the video for "Assistant to the Regional Manager" was released April 6, 2010.

== Critical reception ==
Professional ratings
Review scores
Source	Rating
AbsolutePunk.net	(80%)
AllMusic	3.5/5 stars
DecoyMusic	3.5/4 stars
FemaleFirst	5/5 stars
Jesus Freak Hideout	4.5/5 stars

The album entered the Billboard 200 at number 11 with sales of 31,000 in the first week, making it the band's most successful album at the time of its release. The album also peaked at number one on the Billboard Top Independent Albums, Top Hard Rock Albums, and Christian Albums charts.

== Track listing ==
All lyrics are written by Mike Hranica; all music is composed by the Devil Wears Prada

No.	Title	Length
1.	"Sassafras"	3:16
2.	"I Hate Buffering"	3:05
3.	"Assistant to the Regional Manager"	3:37
4.	"Dez Moines"	4:04
5.	"Big Wiggly Style"	4:13
6.	"Danger: Wildman"	4:01
7.	"Ben Has a Kid"	3:57
8.	"Wapakalypse"	3:44
9.	"Gimme Half"	4:21
10.	"Louder Than Thunder"	2:37
11.	"Lord Xenu"	3:26
Total length:		40:17

== Personnel ==
The Devil Wears Prada

- Mike Hranica - lead vocals
- Chris Rubey - lead guitar
- Jeremy DePoyster - rhythm guitar, clean vocals, lead vocals on track 10
- Andy Trick - bass
- James Baney - keyboards, synthesizer, piano
- Daniel Williams - drums, percussion

Production

- Engineered, mixed and mastered by Joey Sturgis
- Produced by the Devil Wears Prada and Joey Sturgis
- A&R by Carl Severson
- Illustrations by Dan Seagrave
- Layout by Sons of Nero

== Charts ==
Chart (2009)	Peak position
US Billboard 200	11
US Top Christian Albums	1
US Top Hard Rock Albums	1
US Top Independent Albums	1
