= Plagues (album) =

Studio album by The Devil Wears Prada
- Released: August 21, 2007
- Recorded: Late 2006 – Early 2007
- Studios: The Foundation Recording Studios, Connersville, Indiana
- Genres: Metalcore, screamo
- Length: 37:48
- Label: Rise
- Producer: Joey Sturgis

The Devil Wears Prada chronology
Dear Love: A Beautiful Discord (2006)	Plagues (2007)	With Roots Above and Branches Below (2009)

Re-release cover
- The cover for the re-release of Plagues

Plagues is the second studio album by American metalcore band The Devil Wears Prada. It was released on August 21, 2007, through Rise Records and was re-released on October 28, 2008, with bonus content.

== Background and recording ==
The recording sessions for Plagues began during winter of 2006 after Joey Sturgis was selected to produce the album. The album's title is a reference to the plagues mentioned in the Book of Revelation. Lead vocalist Mike Hranica considered it to be "very visually appealing", although not as important as the meaning placed behind it. The recording was completed in spring 2007 and the album was released on August 21, 2007.

Plagues was re-released on October 28, 2008. The bonus content for the re-release includes an alternative cover, booklet art and a DVD which has footage of The Devil Wears Prada playing at Ultimatour and Warped Tour in 2008. It also includes the music videos for "Hey John, What's Your Name Again?" and "HTML Rulez D00d". Some of the pre-ordered versions of Plagues included a darker booklet that was signed by all the band members and a white disc, as opposed to the standard version which has a black disc and a lighter booklet.

The song "Hey John, What's Your Name Again?" is available as downloadable content for the Rock Band series of video games. The song "HTML Rulez D00d" is also available as downloadable content only for Rock Band 2 and Rock Band 3 via the Rock Band Network.

== Composition ==
About.com referred to the album as incorporating "the usual metalcore style and constant breakdowns with synths and some rock elements that add a little twist to The Devil Wears Prada's sound."

== Critical reception ==
Professional ratings
Review scores
Source	Rating
About.com	3.0/5 stars
AllMusic	2.5/5 stars
AbsolutePunk	(80%)
Rocklouder	4/5 stars
Sputnikmusic	2/5 stars
Jesus Freak Hideout	3.5/5 stars

The album has received mostly positive reviews since its release. Scott Fryberger of Jesus Freak Hideout said the song titles were "catchy, interesting, and sometimes funny" and praised the religious lyrics in "HTML Rulez D00d" and "Hey John, What's Your Name Again?" while also highlighting the self-loathing of "Reptar, King of the Ozone." Fryberger concluded his review by stating "the hardcore fan will find an album that was well worth their time, and an album they will want to listen to again and again."

A more mixed review came from AllMusic's Eduardo Rivadavia, who criticized the album's off-topic song titles. Rivadavia compared the album to the band's debut, stating "the youthful sextet shifted a respectable amount of units with their first CD, 2006's Dear Love: A Beautiful Discord, and therefore saw no reason to tarry, nor alter their spastic screamo/metalcore formula while recording [their] sophomore outing" and "as a result, typical new offerings like 'Number Three, Never Forget' and 'Hey John, What's Your Name Again?' jostle the usual conflicting tendencies toward downtuned brutality and soaring harmonies, topped with alternately growled or clean-sung vocals to match each occasion -- but attempt nothing that TDWP influences like Norma Jean, Haste the Day, and the similarly synthesizer-addled Still Remains haven't already explored more extensively and effectively." Sputnikmusic criticised the album's heavy sections and Hranica's vocals but praised the more melodic sections of the album, namely the keys.

== Commercial performance ==
Plagues peaked at #57 on the Billboard 200 on September 8, 2007. The album has been a great success since its original release, selling 30,000 more copies than their first album, Dear Love: A Beautiful Discord.

== Track listing ==
No.	Title	Length
1.	"Goats on a Boat"	4:23
2.	"Number Three, Never Forget"	3:41
3.	"HTML Rulez D00d"	3:56
4.	"Hey John, What's Your Name Again?"	3:46
5.	"Don't Dink and Drance"	2:59
6.	"You Can't Spell "Crap" Without "C""	3:30
7.	"This Song Is Called"	4:25
8.	"Reptar, King of the Ozone"	3:10
9.	"The Scorpion Deathlock"	3:50
10.	"Nickels Is Money Too"	4:08
Total length:		37:48

South Korean edition bonus tracks
No.	Title	Length
11.	"Modeify the Pronunciation"	4:35
12.	"Salvation"	3:36
Total length:		43:59

Re-release DVD
No.	Title	Length
1.	"Warped Tour"
2.	"Ultimatour"	47:07
3.	"Hey John, What's Your Name Again?" (music video)	3:49
4.	"HTML Rulez D00d" (music video)	3:43

== Personnel ==
The Devil Wears Prada

- Mike Hranica – unclean vocals
- Jeremy DePoyster – rhythm guitar, clean vocals
- Chris Rubey – lead guitar
- Andy Trick – bass guitar
- James Baney – keyboard, piano
- Daniel Williams – drums

Production

- Joey Sturgis – engineering, mixing, mastering and production
- Chris Rubey – layout and design
- Dan Mumford – layout and design (re-release cover)
- Eric Rushing – management

Additional musicians

- Craig Owens of Chiodos
- Cole Wallace of Gwen Stacy
