= Stephen Keech =

American musician (born 1986)

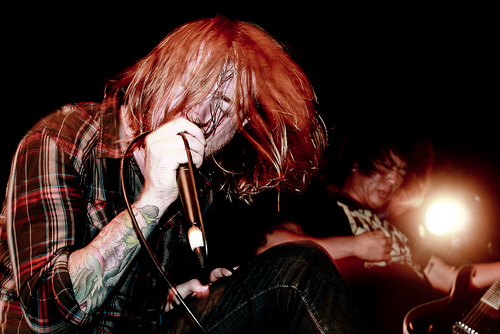
- Keech (and Dave Krysl) with Haste the Day in 2007

Background information
- Born: Stephen Albert Joseph Keech; December 14, 1986 (age 39); Grand Prairie, Texas, US
- Genres: Christian metal, heavy metal, metalcore
- Occupations: Musician, producer, songwriter
- Instruments: Vocals, bass
- Years active: 2002–present
- Member of: Haste the Day
- Formerly of: New Day Awakening, As Cities Burn
- Website: stephenkeech.com

Stephen Albert Joseph Keech is an American musician. He spent his early years as the vocalist and songwriter for the metalcore band Haste the Day. He was also the vocalist for New Day Awakening and bassist for As Cities Burn.

== History ==
In 2002, Keech started his musical career with the band New Day Awakening, for whom he provided vocals. The band recorded an EP, titled: Plague: Hysteria in 2005, but disbanded in 2006.

In 2007, Keech was asked to fill-in Haste the Day after original vocalist Jimmy Ryan left the band on a European tour with The Juliana Theory. Initially, Keech declined as he had been dedicated to New Day Awakening's career, before being convinced by his friends and family. Keech's previous band had performed with Haste the Day before when they came through Denver. The band recorded a Split EP with From Autumn to Ashes, titled Stitches/Deth Kult Social Club in 2007, before recording Keech's HTD debut, Pressure the Hinges. Keech wrote three songs for his debut with Haste the Day, including "The Minor Prophets".

In 2008, the band parted ways with lead guitarist Jason Barnes for no longer being a Christian, who was also the band's lead songwriter at the time. The band approached Dave Krysl (ex-New Day Awakening) to join as touring lead guitarist, with Keech most of the guitars for the record and Randy Vanderbilt (ex-Scarlet) performing the parts. The band recorded Dreamer in 2008, before Brennan Chaulk and Devin Chaulk left the band.

With the Chaulk brothers departure, Krysl became an official member, with Murphy and Keech hiring guitarist Scotty Whelan (ex-Phinehas) and drummer Giuseppe Capolupo (ex-Demise of Eros, Once Nothing) to round out the lineup. This new lineup recorded Attack of the Wolf King and eventually disbanded in 2011.

In 2012, former label mates, As Cities Burn, hired Keech to be their touring bassist. In 2014, Haste the Day reunited to record Coward, which was produced by Keech and released in 2015. The band also played a series of album release shows in support of Coward. On August 3, 2016, As Cities Burn added Keech to the official lineup. On August 17, 2016, two weeks later, the band announced they would be disbanding. As Cities Burn reunited in 2017, with Keech performing with the band until their final set at Furnace Fest 2023. In early 2023, Haste the Day announced a reunion for Furnace Fest, which featured Keech on vocals, the Chaulk brothers in their respective roles, Murphy on bass, and Krysl and Whelan reprising their roles as guitarists. Once Furnace Fest ended, Devin Chaulk stepped down as drummer for Capolupo to return. The band continued throughout 2023 with dates in Indianapolis, New York, and California.

== Personal life ==
Keech was raised by a pastor. Keech currently resides in East Nashville with his wife. Since Haste the Day disbanded, Keech spent time interning under producer Paul Moak. He has since opened his own studio, and has worked with artists such as Brandon Heath, The Ember Days, Haste The Day, Tenth Avenue North, Bandit, Veridia, Cardboard Kids, Wall of Ears, Bones Owens, and Copper Fox.

== Bands ==
Current

- Haste the Day – Vocals (2007–2011, 2014–2016, 2023–present)
- Keech (Solo) – Vocals (2012–present)

Former

- New Day Awakening – Vocals (2002–2006)
- As Cities Burn – Bass (2012–2013, 2015–2016, 2017–2023)

== Discography ==
Haste the Day

- Stitches/Deth Kult Social Club (2007; Split EP with From Autumn To Ashes)
- Pressure the Hinges (2007)
- Dreamer (2008)
- Attack of the Wolf King (2010)
- Coward (2015)
- Dissenter (2026)

Keech

- ! (2012)

New Day Awakening

- Plague: Hysteria (2005)

As Cities Burn

- Scream Through the Walls (2019)
