= Out of the Dust (disambiguation) =

Out of the Dust is a 1997 children's novel by Karen Hesse. The phrase may also refer to:

- Out of the Dust, American Christian band
- "Out of the Dust", a song by Phinehas from the album The Last Word Is Yours to Speak
