= Cult Fiction =

Studio album by Spitfire
- Released: April 29, 2008
- Recorded: July 9, 2007 at Trax East
- Genres: hardcore punk experimental metal
- Label: Goodfellow Records
- Producer: Eric Rachel

Spitfire chronology
| Self-Help (2006) | Cult Fiction (2008) |

Professional ratings
Review scores
| Source | Rating |
|---|---|
| AbsolutePunk | (8.2/10) |
| Metal Review | (8.3/10) |
| Blistering.com | 8/10 stars |
| Allmusic | 3.5/5 stars |
| The Metal Minute | 4/5 stars |
| Scene Point Blank | (5.8/10) |
| Lords of Metal | 9/10 stars |
| Maelstrom | 8/10 stars |
| Hardrock Haven | (6.3/10) |
| To Many Voices | 9/10 stars |

Cult Fiction is the third studio album by Virginia-based metalcore band Spitfire. It is the follow-up to the band's 2006 album Self-Help. The title of the album seems to be a reference to a previous work by Jon Spencer's first band, Scarlet, titled "Cult Classic".

== Writing and recording ==
Spitfire had this to say about the writing process: "We are writing what is turning out to be the darkest, heaviest, and most diverse record any of us have ever written. Our approach to this record is to saturate it with more emotion than we ever have put into our music before."

== Release and distribution ==
Cult Fiction was released in the United States on April 29, 2008, by hardcore indie label Goodfellow Records. The album was released in both digital download and digipak CD format.

== Reception ==
The album has been generally well received by critics. Joshua of Maelstrom lauded the visceral nature of the album, claiming "Cult Fiction rips all sorts of new orifices in the most uncomfortably delicious of ways". Complimenting the track Apnea 1 (Segue 1) Sasha Horn of Metal Review states "If I had three minutes and thirteen seconds left until the end of the world by tsunami, I'd take my ghetto-blaster with me to the end of a pier, turn this up on ten, close my eyes, and let the waves separate me". The album artwork and packaging has also received considerable attention: "the performances, songs, and even the CD’s packaging-about Cult Fiction indicates it’s a first-class effort" states Zak Brown of Blistering.com, noting "The album’s artwork is truly part of the listening experience...".

== Legacy ==
Was born. Started cult. Fulfilled prophecy. Died with dignity.

== Track listing ==
| No. | Title | Length |
|---|---|---|
| 1. | "Arrhythmia Drift" | 3:46 |
| 2. | "Chemo Therapist" | 3:35 |
| 3. | "Apnea 1" | 3:13 |
| 4. | "Crossed" | 2:59 |
| 5. | "Mother Earth In Labor" | 2:39 |
| 6. | "Dawn Patrol" | 1:52 |
| 7. | "The Animal Kingdom Of Heaven's Gate" | 1:16 |
| 8. | "Track Marxist" | 4:39 |
| 9. | "Brain Debris" | 3:00 |
| 10. | "Pro-Life" | 3:13 |
| 11. | "Meth Monster" | 3:39 |
| 12. | "Meat Maker" | 6:04 |
| 13. | "Apnea 2" | 1:32 |
| 14. | "In Vitro" | 4:11 |
| 15. | "Ω" | 4:15 |

== Personnel ==
- Matt Beck - guitar
- Chris Raines - drums
- Jon Spencer - vocals
- Dan Tulloh - guitar
