= Gwen Stacy (band) =

American metalcore band

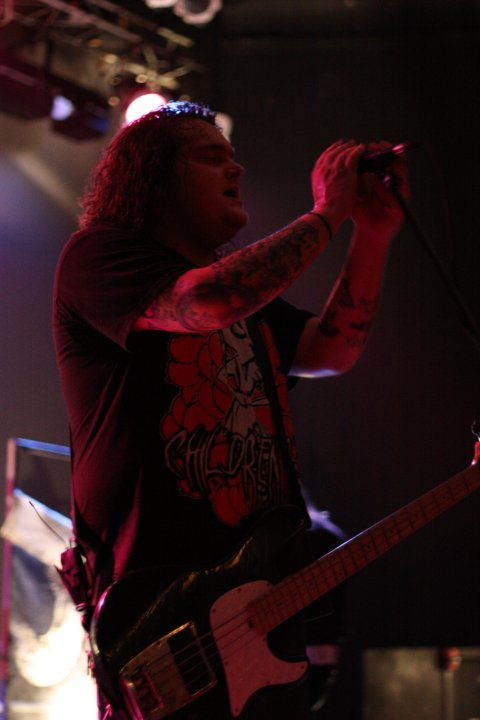
- Brent Schindler performing with Gwen Stacy in June 2010

Background information
- Origin: Indianapolis, Indiana, U.S.
- Genres: Christian metal; Christian hardcore; metalcore; post-hardcore; emo
- Years active: 2004–2010; 2014
- Labels: Ferret; Solid State
- Past members: Brent Schindler; Geoff Jenkins; Patrick Meadows; Matt Strahl; Brett Sibley; Chris Suter; Josh Rickard; Jake Brewster; Dustin Joseph; Cole Wallace; TJ Sego; Bobby Oakley; Robby Pannett

Gwen Stacy was an American metalcore band from Indianapolis, Indiana, active between 2004 and 2010. Their name came from the character Gwen Stacy, who appeared in the comic book The Amazing Spider-Man as the girlfriend of Peter Parker. The band announced a reunion in April 2014.

== History ==
=== Formation and early years (2004–2008) ===
Gwen Stacy formed in December 2004 by founding members Brent Schindler and T. J. Sego along with previous members Chris Suter and Josh Rickard. After several member changes the band was probably best recognized with members Cole Wallace, Brent Schindler, T.J. Sego, Patrick Meadows, and Mike Bryant. In 2007 Gwen Stacy signed to Ferret Records and released their first full-length album, The Life I Know, on February 5, 2008. The album received mixed to negative reviews; Alternative Press gave it 1.5/5 stars, saying that "they make Avenged Sevenfold seem like progressive luminaries", while allmusic.com gave them 2.5/5 stars, saying that "they're a passable metal band, having obviously done their homework and modeled their chops after hardcore's heaviest hitters."

=== Lineup changes and A Dialogue (2009) ===
In a blog posted by Gwen Stacy, during late December the band announced that Geoff Jenkins, guitarist previously of the band Once Nothing would become the band's new vocalist. In this time, Gwen Stacy did a headlining tour with Our Last Night, Vanna, and In Fear and Faith, a trip to Europe with Poison the Well and 36 Crazy Fists from March to April, a tour with Eyes Set to Kill, and a headlining run with support from Ice Nine Kills and Stray from the Path in the fall of 2009. Guitarist, Jordan Tomb, also a previous band member of Once Nothing then accompanied Gwen Stacy for their 2009 tour.

Gwen Stacy went into the studio in mid May with Andreas Magnusson, whose previous work includes Haste the Day's album Dreamer and Oh, Sleeper's record When I Am God, among others. The record was released on October 20, 2009. JesusFreakHideout scooped that the next album was to be called A Dialogue, correlating with the October 20 release through Solid State Records. The band issued a press release stating that the new album was indeed called A Dialogue and would be released on October 20 through Solid State Records.

In September 2009, the band recorded their first video from A Dialogue in an abandoned neighborhood in Bensenville, IL to the song "The First Words". Then on October 15, 2009, the band recorded a second video for the song "A Dialogue". Both videos were directed by Jeremy E. Jackson, who also did their video for "The Fear in Your Eyes". The main protagonist in both videos is ex-founding member Chris Suter.

Gwen Stacy kicked off the fall of 2009 with a tour with Ice Nine Kills (Ferret Music) and Stray from the Path (Sumerian Records). They then opened for Haste The Day with support from Amarna Reign on a short run in December.

=== Departure of TJ and breakup (2010) ===
Original drummer and one of the founding members of Gwen Stacy decided to leave the band in late May 2010 to pursue school and other interests. In early June, they attained members Brett Sibley, who would replace TJ on drums and Matt Strahl (both formerly of the band Venable), who would finally take the position as a permanent second guitarist. They then set out to tour with Inhale Exhale and This or the Apocalypse as the new lineup. Gwen Stacy also toured with A City Serene and Lower Definition on the No Bummer Summer tour in July. September 2 kicks off the start of a mini-tour with another Indianapolis based band, Amarna Reign. As of November 7, 2010, Gwen Stacy officially announced they were splitting up via the band's Myspace. They played their last show at Rhino's in Bloomington, IN on November 20, 2010.

=== Reunion and other projects (2014–present) ===
In April 2014, the band announced that the original lineup would be reuniting for a show at the Irving Theater in Indianapolis, Indiana on June 14 with friends Deadera, Once Nothing and SpeedGod. The band also launched an indiegogo account to fund the show. Members of the band have stated via social media that this is a "one time event" and that they have no intention of continuing the band after the show.

Longtime guitarist Patrick Meadows joined local Indiana band Barricades as their guitarist in 2015.

== Members ==
Final lineup

- Geoff Jenkins – lead vocals (2008–2010, 2014), rhythm guitar (2008–2010)
- Brent Schindler – bass, clean vocals (2004–2010, 2014)
- Patrick Meadows – lead guitar (2006–2010, 2014), rhythm guitar (2005–2006)
- Brett Sibley – drums (2010, 2014)
- Matt Strahl – rhythm guitar (2010, 2014)

Former

- Cole Wallace – lead vocals (2005–2008)
- Chris Suter – lead vocals, rhythm guitar (2004–2005)
- Josh Rickard – lead guitar (2004–2006)
- T. J. Sego – drums (2004–2008)
- Bobby Oakley – lead vocals (2008), rhythm guitar (2007–2008)
- Alex Sanchez – drums (2008–2010)

Timeline

== Discography ==
=== Studio albums ===
Date of release	Title	Label
February 5, 2008	The Life I Know	Ferret Music
October 20, 2009	A Dialogue	Solid State Records

=== Expanded plays ===
Date of release	Title	Label
November 20, 2005	...I Believe in Humility	Self-released
2006	Demo	Self-released

=== Singles ===
- "A Dialogue" (2009)

=== Video albums ===
- A Dialogue with Gwen Stacy: The DVD (2009)

== Music videos ==
- "The Fear in Your Eyes" The Life I Know
- "The First Words" A Dialogue
- "A Dialogue" A Dialogue
