= Dark Flag =

Studio album by Phinehas
- Released: November 17, 2017
- Recorded: 2017
- Studios: Casualty Studios; Glow in the Dark Studios, Atlanta, Georgia, U.S.
- Genres: Metalcore; Christian metal; srscore
- Length: 43:58
- Label: Solid State
- Producers: Matt Goldman; Daniel Gailey

Phinehas chronology
Fight Through the Night (2016)	Dark Flag (2017)	The Fire Itself (2021)

Singles from Dark Flag
- 1. "Dark Flag" Released: September 29, 2017; 2. "Know Death; Know Forever" Released: October 13, 2017; 3. "Hell Below" Released: October 27, 2017

Dark Flag is the fourth studio album by American metalcore band Phinehas. The album was released on November 17, 2017, through Solid State Records, the band's first release through the label. It was produced by Matt Goldman and Daniel Gailey, the band's guitarist.

== Composition ==
Dark Flag is a concept album about human rights abuse in North Korea. Originally, the band recorded the album in four with Sean McCulloch on vocals, Daniel Gailey on guitar, Bryce Kelley on bass, and Lee Humerian on drums. However, Humerian left the band during production of the record while they were also on tour. Gailey produced the album with Matt Goldman (Underoath, Copeland, The Chariot). Track 10, "Communion for Ravens", features guest vocals from Jimmy Ryan of Haste the Day.

Professional ratings
Review scores
Source	Rating
Alternative Press	4/5 stars
Indie Vision Music	Highly recommended
Jesus Freak Hideout	4/5 stars
New Noise Magazine	4/5 stars

== Track listing ==
All lyrics are written by Sean McCulloch; all music is composed by Phinehas.

No.	Title	Length
1.	"Dark Flag"	4:11
2.	"Burning Bright"	4:26
3.	"I Saw the Bombs Fall"	3:33
4.	"The 38th Parallel"	2:11
5.	"Hell Below"	3:36
6.	"A War That Never Ends"	3:20
7.	"Break the Earth"	4:24
8.	"My Rosary"	3:27
9.	"The Arduous March"	1:26
10.	"Communion for Ravens" (featuring Jimmy Ryan of Haste the Day)	3:36
11.	"Meaningless Names"	4:38
12.	"Know Death; Know Forever"	5:06
Total length:		43:58

== Personnel ==
Phinehas

- Sean McCulloch – lead vocals, artwork
- Daniel Gailey – guitars, backing vocals, engineering, mixing, production
- Bryce Kelley – bass, backing vocals
- Lee Humerian – drums, backing vocals (left during production)

Additional musicians

- Jimmy Ryan of Haste the Day – guest vocals on track 10, "Communion for Ravens"
- Luke Conway – additional vocals
- Lauren Gailey – additional vocals
- Alex Garmon – additional vocals
- Keifer Johnson – additional vocals
- Parry Kitt – additional vocals
- Joshua Landry – additional vocals
- Ben White – additional vocals
- Dustin Williams – additional vocals

Additional personnel

- Matt Goldman – production, vocal engineering
- Nicholas Morzov – drum engineering
- Troy Glessner – mastering
- Scott Baldwin Lee – vibe mastering
- Adam Skatula – A&R
- Jim Hughes – layout
- Sarah McCulloch – photography

== Charts ==
Chart (2017)	Peak Position
U.S. Billboard Hard Rock Albums	20
U.S. Billboard Independent Albums	18
U.S. Billboard Top Christian Albums	11
