= Defining Moments =

Defining Moments may refer to:

- "Defining Moments", a song by Phinehas from the 2021 album The Fire Itself
- "Defining Moments", the third episode of the fourth season of Sex and the City
- Defining Moments (film), a film starring Burt Reynolds
- Defining Moments, a line of Air Jordan shoes produced by Nike
