= Dream Thief =

Dream Thief may refer to:

- "Dream Thief", a song by Phinehas from the 2021 album The Fire Itself
- The Dream Thief, a series of novels by Wim Gijsen

- Iskander the Dream Thief, the first installment in the series

- The Dream Thief, an album featuring jazz band leader Shai Maestro
- The Dream Thief: An Extraordinary Horatio Lyle Mystery, a novel by Catherine Webb
- The Dream Thief, a theatrical play by Robert Schenkkan
- Abadazad: The Dream Thief, a novel by J. M. DeMatteis
- "The Dream Thief", an episode of Hello Kitty and Friends
- "Beheeyem, Duosion, and the Dream Thief!", an episode of Pokémon the Series: Black & White
