= Reckoner (album) =

Studio album by Trenches
- Released: January 1, 2022
- Genre: Metalcore; death metal; post-metal; sludge metal
- Length: 36:36
- Producer: Joel David Lauver

Trenches chronology
The Tide Will Swallow Us Whole (2008)	Reckoner (2022)

Professional ratings
Review scores
Source	Rating
Metal Injection	8/10

Reckoner is the second and final album by American band Trenches. It is their first album since The Tide Will Swallow Us Whole from 2008.

== Track listing ==
1. "The Wrecking Age" – 2:00
2. "Horizons" – 3:08
3. "Ties That Bind" – 1:27
4. "The Raging Sea" – 1:53
5. "The Death of All Mammoths" – 3:52
6. "Lenticular Clouds" – 4:33
7. "Eclipse" – 2:45
8. "Empires" – 4:40
9. "Stillness" – 5:53
10. "Reckoner" – 4:18
11. "Remnants" – 2:07

== Credits ==
Trenches

- Jimmy Ryan – lead vocals
- Joel David Lauver – guitars, keyboards, programming, backing vocals
- Carey Joseph Stilts – guitars
- Ross Montgomery – guitars
- Bill Scott – bass
- Dyllen Nance – drums

Production

- JP Leindecker – art direction
