= Attack of the Wolf King =

Studio album by Haste the Day
- Released: June 29, 2010
- Recorded: February–April 2010
- Studio: Azmyth Recording, Richmond, Virginia
- Genre: Metalcore, Christian metal
- Length: 38:25
- Label: Solid State
- Producer: Andreas Lars Magnusson

Haste the Day chronology
Dreamer (2008)	Attack of the Wolf King (2010)	Coward (2015)

Professional ratings
Review scores
Source	Rating
AllMusic	2.5/5 stars
Alternative Press	3.5/5 stars
Jesus Freak Hideout	4.5/5 stars
DecoyMusic	4/5 stars
IndieVisionMusic	9/10 stars
Rock Sound	8/10 stars
The New Review	4/5 stars

Attack of the Wolf King is the fifth studio album from Haste the Day. The album was released on June 29, 2010 through Solid State Records. A song from the album, entitled "Travesty" was released on the band's MySpace on May 4. Lyrics for "Travesty" were released on May 21, 2010 on the band's Facebook. The song "Dog Like Vultures" has been played live since early April and debuted April 8 in Evansville, IN. This is the first album to feature new members, Dave Krysl, Giuseppe Capolupo, and Scott Whelan. On the CD's release day, the band played a show in Bloomington, IN, where they performed an extended setlist with all the former members of the band, playing songs from the That They May Know You EP through Attack of the Wolf King. On June 8 the band released the song "Wake Up The Sun" on their Myspace.

On August 10, 2010, CI Records released a 7-inch vinyl single of "Travesty" with two other tracks from the album. The release was limited to 1000 copies on swirl colored vinyl.

== Track listing ==
No.	Title	Length
1.	"Wake Up the Sun"	3:23
2.	"Dog Like Vultures"	3:46
3.	"The Quiet, Deadly Ticking"	2:49
4.	"Travesty"	3:59
5.	"Merit for Sadness"	3:12
6.	"The Un-Manifest"	3:15
7.	"The Place Where Most Deny" (featuring Micah Kinard of Oh, Sleeper)	3:58
8.	"White As Snow"	4:40
9.	"Crush Resistance"	3:16
10.	"Walk With a Crooked Spine"	3:41
11.	"My Name Is Darkness"	2:25
Total length:		38:25

Deluxe Edition bonus tracks
No.	Title	Length
12.	"Meet Me Halfway" (Black Eyed Peas cover)	4:05
13.	"Blue 42" (Live in Auckland, New Zealand)	6:46
14.	"Pressure the Hinges" (Live in Cape Town, South Africa)	4:40

== Personnel ==
Haste the Day

- Stephen Keech – lead vocals
- Michael Murphy – bass guitar, vocals
- Dave Krysl – lead guitar
- Scott Whelan – rhythm guitar, vocals
- Giuseppe "Gypsy" Capolupo – drums, percussion

Former members

- Brennan Chaulk - rhythm guitar, vocals
- Matt Marquez - drums
- Blake Martin - rhythm guitar

Guest vocals

- Micah Kinard of Oh, Sleeper

Production

- Andreas Lars Magnusson – producer and engineering
- Brian "Bone" Thorburn – producer and engineering (Meet Me Half Way only)
- Jason Suecof – mixing
- Recorded at Azmyth Recording (Andreas' Home Studio), Richmond, Virginia
- Recorded at Threshold Studios (Bone's Home Studio), Indianapolis, Indiana (Meet Me Half Way only)
- Jon Dunn – A&R
