= 38th parallel =

38th parallel may refer to:

- 38th parallel north, a circle of latitude in the Northern Hemisphere
  - This line of latitude was used as the pre-Korean War boundary between North Korea and South Korea; see Division of Korea
  - The term may also refer to the current border between the Koreas, the Korean Demilitarized Zone
- 38th parallel south, a circle of latitude in the Southern Hemisphere
- 38th parallel structures, a series of circular depressions roughly on the 38th parallel north
- 38th Parallel (band), a short-lived Christian rap-rock band that formed in 2000
- "The 38th Parallel", a song by Phinehas from the 2017 album Dark Flag
