= Coward (Haste the Day album) =

Studio album by Haste the Day
- Released: May 18, 2015
- Studio: Dirty Denim Studio, Nashville, Tennessee; Threshold Studios, Indianapolis, Indiana
- Genre: Metalcore, Christian metal, hard rock
- Length: 41:31
- Label: Solid State
- Producer: Stephen Keech

Haste the Day chronology
Attack of the Wolf King (2010)	Coward (2015)	Dissenter (2026)

Coward is the sixth studio album from Haste the Day. Solid State Records released the album on May 18, 2015. The album was released following the band's successful funding campaign via the crowdfunding website IndieGoGo, to which fans contributed more than twice the band's original goal. Coward is unique in that it features contributions from every member throughout the band's career, and is the first studio album to feature original vocalist Jimmy Ryan since the band's 2005 release When Everything Falls.

== Critical reception ==
Professional ratings
Review scores
Source	Rating
Alternative Press	3.5/5 stars
HM Magazine	4/5 stars
Indie Vision Music	4/5 stars
Jesus Freak Hideout	3.5/5 stars
Jesus Wired	9.5/10 stars
New Noise Magazine	3/5 stars

Awarding the album three and a half stars from Alternative Press, Tyler Sharp writes, "Coward tends to lack an overall sense of cohesion, creating a slight disconnect for the listener, yet doesn’t hold the band back from creating arguably some of their most profound material to date, in bouts of progressive, titan metalcore." Timothy Estabrooks, giving the album three and a half stars for Jesus Freak Hideout, writes, "Unfortunately, the results are as mixed as the band itself ... Foundationally, Coward is as solid as you would expect from a veteran band." Indicating in a four star review by HM Magazine, Taylor Boyce says, "It's as aggressive as any of their previous releases, and their keen ability to craft well-written songs with an ear for the listener solidifies this release...and the band...as true marks of talent."

Rating the album four stars at Indie Vision Music, Brody Barbour describes, "With multiple listens, however, I soon discovered this album plays out best as a greatest hits album, with all the best parts of Haste the Day placed within." Jesse Striewski, awarding the album three stars by New Noise Magazine, says, "Like any Haste The Day album, this won’t appeal to everyone; but those who have been waiting for these guys to release new music should be able to appreciate it." Assigning the album nine and a half stars at Jesus Wired, Topher P. states, "Coward is still a phenomenal effort with minimal flaws, if any at all."

== Track listing ==
No.	Title	Length
1.	"Begin"	3:20
2.	"Take"	2:27
3.	"World"	3:43
4.	"Coward"	3:05
5.	"Lost"	3:27
6.	"Reconcile"	3:55
7.	"Shadow" (featuring Janell Belcher of The Ember Days)	3:32
8.	"Fail"	4:00
9.	"Accept"	4:24
10.	"Secret"	3:56
11.	"Gnaw"	5:42
Total length:		41:31

== Personnel ==
=== Haste the Day ===
- Stephen Keech – unclean vocals on all tracks except "Take" and "Accept"
- Jimmy Ryan – unclean vocals on "Take," "Shadow," "Fall" and "Accept"
- Brennan Chaulk – guitar, clean vocals
- Scott Whelan – guitar
- Dave Krysl – guitar
- Jason Barnes – lead guitar on "Accept"
- Mike Murphy – bass, backing vocals
- Giuseppe Capolupo – drums, percussion
- Devin Chaulk – drums on "Accept"

=== Additional musicians ===
- Vocals by Janell Belcher of The Ember Days
- Background vocals by Colin Baney, Marcus Baney, David Dove, Ryan Green, Corey Joseph, Stephen Keech, Jeff Keys, Jedidiah Lachmann, Sam Lowell, Logan Mackenzie and Alex Ramirez

=== Production ===
- Producer – Stephen Keech
- Recording – Dirty Denim Studio, Nashville, TN / Threshold Studios, Indianapolis, IN
- Engineer – Jason Belcher, Seiji Itaru Inouye, Lane Johnson, Stephen Keech and Brian Thorburn
- Mixing – Matt Goldman at Glow in the Dark, Atlanta, GA
- Mastering – Sam Moses
- Management – Mark LaFay

=== Artwork and design ===
- Artwork – Ryan Scott
- Cover photo – Marcus Baney

== Chart performance ==
Chart (2015)	Peak position
US Billboard 200	105
US Top Christian Albums (Billboard)	2
US Top Hard Rock Albums (Billboard)	7
US Independent Albums (Billboard)	13
US Top Rock Albums (Billboard)	16
