= The Life I Know =

Studio album by Gwen Stacy
- Released: February 5, 2008
- Genre: Metalcore, post-hardcore
- Length: 44:28
- Label: Ferret
- Producer: Brian McTernan; Paul Leavitt; Gwen Stacy

Gwen Stacy chronology
| Demos 2006 (2006) | The Life I Know (2008) | A Dialogue (2009) |

Professional ratings
Review scores
| Source | Rating |
|---|---|
| AbsolutePunk.net | 75% |
| AllMusic | 2.5/5 stars |
| Alternative Press | 1.5/5 stars |
| Jesus Freak Hideout | 2.5/5 stars |
| Punk News | 2/5 stars |

The Life I Know is the second studio album by metalcore band Gwen Stacy. The album was released on February 5, 2008 through Ferret Music.

The Life I Know was re-released on April 3, 2009 featuring the ...I Believe in Humility EP as bonus tracks.

== Track listing ==
All tracks are written by Gwen Stacy, except where noted.

| No. | Title | Length |
|---|---|---|
| 1. | "The Path to Certainty" | 3:01 |
| 2. | "I Was Born with Two First Names" | 4:00 |
| 3. | "Challenger Pt. 2" | 3:22 |
| 4. | "If We Live Right, We Can't Die Wrong" | 4:13 |
| 5. | "What Will Happen If I Hit Enter" | 3:25 |
| 6. | "The Fear in Your Eyes" | 3:34 |
| 7. | "Playing God Is Playing for Keeps" | 2:58 |
| 8. | "Falling from the Fence" | 3:18 |
| 9. | "Sleeping in the Train Yard" | 7:17 |
| 10. | "Gone Fishing. See You in a Year" | 4:48 |
| 11. | "Paved Gold with Good Intentions" | 2:53 |
| 12. | "I'll Splatter You Like Jackson Pollock" | 3:39 |
| Total length: | | 44:28 |

Special edition bonus tracks
| No. | Title | Writer(s) | Length |
|---|---|---|---|
| 13. | "Intro" | Gwen Stacy, Josh Rickard | 0:20 |
| 14. | "The Way It Should Be" | Gwen Stacy, Rickard | 3:07 |
| 15. | "All Those Who Are Flawless, Raise Your Hand (or Don't)" | Gwen Stacy, Rickard | 4:15 |
| 16. | "Hey God, This Song's for You. I Hope You Like It" | Gwen Stacy, Rickard | 4:50 |
| 17. | "Jeremiah Buys a Field" | Gwen Stacy, Rickard | 4:24 |
| 18. | "Haven't Felt Too Well in a While" | Gwen Stacy, Rickard | 3:25 |
| 19. | "Hoy Empezamos una Vida Nueva" | Gwen Stacy, Rickard | 8:32 |

== Personnel ==
Gwen Stacy

- Cole Wallace – lead vocals
- Patrick Meadows – guitar
- Brent Schindler – bass, clean vocals
- T. J. Sego – drums, programming

Additional

- Brian McTernan – producer
- Paul Leavitt – producer, engineer, mixing
- Gwen Stacy – producer
- Michael Fossenkemper – mastering
- Sons of Nero – artwork, concept, design
- Nicholas Routzen – photography
