= Thegodmachine =

Studio album by Phinehas
- Released: July 19, 2011 (physical); September 30, 2011 (digital)
- Studio: Relic Recordings, Whittier, California
- Genre: Metalcore; Christian metal
- Length: 49:40
- Label: Red Cord
- Producer: Jeff Darcy; Phinehas

Phinehas chronology
Phinehas (2009)	Thegodmachine (2011)	The Bridge Between (2013)

Singles from Thegodmachine
- 1. "I Am the Lion" Released: December 6, 2011; 2. "Crowns" Released: April 17, 2012; 3. "My Horses Are Many" Released: October 19, 2012

Thegodmachine is the debut studio album by American metalcore band Phinehas. The band was signed to the independent Christian metal label, Red Cord Records, shortly after the album's production was finished. The album was physically released on July 19, 2011, and was later digitally released on September 30, 2011. It was produced by the band themselves and Jeff Darcy.

== Promotion and release ==
The album received a physical release on July 19, 2011 and later a digital release on September 30. A music video was released for the song "I Am the Lion" on December 6. The video was directed by Josiah Bultima under the Red Epic moniker. "Crowns" was released as the second video from the album on April 17, 2012. The music video was directed by John Mediana. The third and final music video released from the album was "My Horses Are Many"; the video was released on October 19 and was directed by the band. The video shows the band at a mini-golf course in Wichita Falls, Texas on a day off from touring.

Acoustic versions of "A Pattern in Pain", "Crowns" and "The Wishing Well" were released on the EP The Bridge Between.

Professional ratings
Review scores
Source	Rating
Indie Vision Music	5/5 stars
Ultimate Guitar	9.7/10
Under the Gun	9/10

== Track listing ==
All lyrics are written by Sean McCulloch; all music is composed by Phinehas.

No.	Title	Length
1.	"Thegodmachine: The Speaking Stone"	1:22
2.	"Bad Blood"	3:36
3.	"A Pattern in Pain"	5:16
4.	"I Am the Lion" (re-recorded version; original version from Phinehas)	4:52
5.	"From One End of the Sky to the Other"	4:28
6.	"Legacy" (instrumental)	0:58
7.	"Crowns"	4:02
8.	"The Wishing Well"	4:31
9.	"My Horses Are Many"	3:28
10.	"Grace Disguised by Darkness" (re-recorded version; original version from Phinehas)	5:38
11.	"Pendulum"	2:54
12.	"Thegodmachine: The Rider"	6:36
13.	"That I May Love You" (instrumental)	1:52
Total length:		49:40

== Personnel ==
Credits adapted from AllMusic.

Phinehas

- Sean McCulloch – lead vocals, additional guitars
- Jason Combs – lead guitar, engineering
- Dustin Saunders – rhythm guitar
- Scott Whelan – rhythm guitar, backing vocals (left during production)
- Ryan Estrada – bass
- Lee Humerian – drums, backing vocals, additional guitars

Additional musicians

- Thomas Cho – additional guitars and vocals
- Bryce Adkins – additional vocals
- Mike Ruffino – additional vocals

Additional personnel

- Jeff Darcy – engineering, mixing, mastering, additional guitars and vocals, production
- Phinehas – production
- Mitchell Levine – management
- Trent Tieso – artwork, direction
