= Pressure the Hinges =

Studio album by Haste the Day
- Released: March 20, 2007
- Genres: Metalcore, Christian metal
- Length: 48:16
- Label: Solid State
- Producer: Garth Richardson

Haste the Day chronology
When Everything Falls (2005)	Pressure the Hinges (2007)	Dreamer (2008)

Alternative cover
- special edition cover

Professional ratings
Review scores
Source	Rating
AllMusic	3.5/5 stars
Jesus Freak Hideout	4.5/5 stars
Power of Metal	94/100
Type 3 Media	6/10 stars

Pressure the Hinges is the third album from Christian metalcore band Haste the Day. This is the band's first album with Stephen Keech as lead vocalist. The album was released on March 20, 2007, through Solid State Records.

Along with the regular version of Pressure the Hinges, a deluxe version of the album was also released. The deluxe version includes a DVD which includes live footage, including the band just hanging out, and working on their new album. It also includes footage of a show with their new vocalist, Stephen Keech, as well as their original singer Jimmy Ryan's last show with the band. The bonus DVD also includes all of the band's current music videos, for "The Closest Thing to Closure", "American Love", and "When Everything Falls". And finally, three bonus songs are included on the album, along with the 13 other tracks.

The album debuted at number 89 on the U.S. Billboard 200, selling about 10,000 copies in its first week.

A music video had been produced for the song "Stitches", which was released on a 7-inch split with From Autumn to Ashes.

== Track listing ==
Standard edition
No.	Title	Length
1.	"Eye of the Needle"	1:18
2.	"Pressure the Hinges"	4:11
3.	"The Minor Prophets"	4:17
4.	"The Oracle"	3:31
5.	"White Collar"	4:27
6.	"Needles"	4:18
7.	"Janet's Planet"	4:29
8.	"Servant Ties"	4:12
9.	"Stitches"	4:11
10.	"Vertigo"	2:51
11.	"Akeldema"	2:49
12.	"Eremus"	1:30
13.	"Chorus of Angels"	6:12

Bonus songs included on the special edition
No.	Title	Length
14.	"In Memory" (album version)	4:07
15.	"Sea of Apathy" (demo) (original version of "White Collar")	4:14
16.	"Chorus of Angels" (demo)	5:40

Bonus songs included on the special edition DVD

1. "Intro"
2. "Pre-Show"
3. "Fallen" (live)
4. "The Perfect Night" (live)
5. "Closest Thing to Closure" (live)
6. "Walk On" (live)
7. "Blue 42" (live)
8. "When Everything Falls" (live)
9. "The After Show"
10. "Blue 42" (live)
11. "Booked Early Checked In"
12. "In the Studio"
13. "Candid Camera"
14. "Backup Vocals"
15. "Untitled"
16. "Happy Birthday"
17. "The Perfect Night" (live)
18. "Pressure the Hinges" (live)
19. "The After Show"
20. "Credits"
21. "When Everything Falls" (music video)
22. "Closest Thing to Closure" (music video)
23. "American Love" (music video)
24. "Intro"
25. "One Life to" live" (live)
26. "Ros King" (live)
27. "Fallen" (live)
28. "Myspace Rumors"
29. "Walk On" (live)
30. "An Honest Confession" (live)
31. "Haste the Day"
32. "American Love" (live)
33. "Blue 42" (live)
34. "Outro"

== Credits ==
Haste the Day

- Stephen Keech – lead vocals
- Brennan Chaulk – clean vocals, rhythm guitar
- Jason Barnes – lead guitar
- Michael Murphy – bass guitar, backing vocals
- Devin Chaulk – drums, clean vocals

Production

- Garth Richardson - producer, mixing
- Ben Kaplan - engineering, mastering
