= Phinehas (EP) =

EP by Phinehas
- Released: December 15, 2009
- Genre: Metalcore; Christian metal
- Length: 21:59
- Label: Self-released
- Producer: Phinehas

Phinehas chronology
Phinehas (2009)	Thegodmachine (2011)

Phinehas is the eponymous debut EP by American metalcore band Phinehas. It was released on December 15, 2009, independently by the band. The EP was produced by the band themselves. This is the band's last release with lead guitarist and founding member Glenn Gizzi, marking the departure of the band's last original member.

== Promotion and release ==
The EP was self-released on December 15, 2009. A music video was produced for the song "Well If the Earths Are Stopped, Then the Fox Faces the Hounds" and was directed by Ricky Norris. "I Am the Lion" and "Grace Disguised by Darkness" were re-recorded for the band's debut Thegodmachine. The tracks "Well If the Earths Are Stopped, Then the Fox Faces the Hounds" and "Panhammer" were later re-recorded for the EP The Bridge Between. "The Jungle" is the only song in the EP that was never re-recorded.

== Track listing ==
No.	Title	Length
1.	"Well If the Earths Are Stopped, Then the Fox Faces the Hounds"	4:04
2.	"The Jungle"	4:22
3.	"Panhammer"	3:41
4.	"I Am the Lion"	4:55
5.	"Grace Disguised by Darkness"	4:54
Total length:		21:59

== Personnel ==
- Sean McCulloch – lead vocals
- Glenn Gizzi – lead guitar, backing vocals
- Scott Whelan – rhythm guitar, backing vocals
- Ryan Estrada – bass
- Lee Humerian – drums, backing vocals
