= The Bridge Between (EP) =

EP by Phinehas
- Released: January 22, 2013
- Genres: Metalcore; Christian metal; acoustic
- Length: 26:59
- Label: Red Cord
- Producer: Phinehas

Phinehas chronology
| Thegodmachine (2011) | The Bridge Between (2013) | The Last Word Is Yours to Speak (2013) |

Singles from The Bridge Between
- 1. "Enkindler" Released: December 20, 2012

The Bridge Between is the second EP by American metalcore band Phinehas. The EP features re-recorded versions of songs from their debut self-titled EP, acoustic renditions of songs from the debut studio album Thegodmachine and new tracks "David and the Gate" and "Enkindler". It was released January 22, 2013, through Red Cord Records and was produced by the band themselves.

Professional ratings
Review scores
| Source | Rating |
|---|---|
| Indie Vision Music | 4/5 stars |
| The Tacoma Ledger | 9/10 |

== Track listing ==
| No. | Title | Length |
|---|---|---|
| 1. | "Panhammer" (re-recorded version; original version from Phinehas) | 3:24 |
| 2. | "Well If the Earths Are Stopped, Then the Fox Faces the Hounds" (re-recorded version; original version from Phinehas) | 3:51 |
| 3. | "David and the Gate" | 4:27 |
| 4. | "A Pattern in Pain" (acoustic version) | 3:35 |
| 5. | "Enkindler" | 3:44 |
| 6. | "Crowns" (acoustic version) | 3:59 |
| 7. | "The Wishing Well" (acoustic version; featuring Ann Marie Flathers) | 3:56 |
| Total length: | | 26:59 |

== Personnel ==
Phinehas

- Sean McCulloch – lead vocals
- Jason Combs – guitars
- Bryce Kelley – bass, backing vocals
- Lee Humerian – drums, backing vocals, piano on track 4

Additional musicians

- Ann Marie Flathers – guest vocals and piano on track 7

Additional personnel

- Phinehas – production
- Jeff Darcy – engineering, mixing, mastering
- Trent Tieso – artwork
