= Haste the Day =

American metalcore band

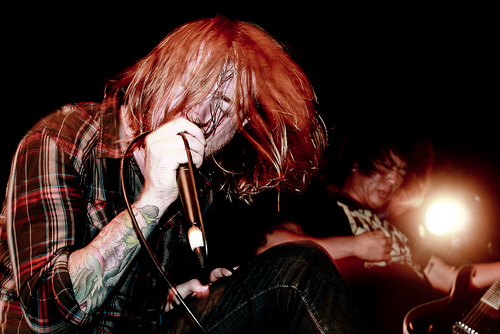
- Vocalist Stephen Keech and guitarist Dave Krysl in 2007 on the Solid State Tour

Background information
- Origin: Carmel, Indiana, U.S.
- Genres: Metalcore, Christian metal
- Years active: 2001–2011, 2014–2016, 2023—present
- Label: Solid State
- Members: Stephen Keech; Brennan Chaulk; Scott Whelan; Dave Krysl; Mike Murphy; Giuseppe Capolupo
- Past members: Jason Barnes; Devin Chaulk; Jimmy Ryan

Haste the Day is an American metalcore band formed in Carmel, Indiana in 2001 and signed to Solid State Records. Their name is derived from a lyric in the hymn "It Is Well with My Soul" by Horatio Spafford. The band released an EP titled That They May Know You, in 2002, followed by five studio albums: Burning Bridges (2004), When Everything Falls (2005), Pressure the Hinges (2007), Dreamer (2008), and Attack of the Wolf King (2010). The group disbanded in March 2011 but reformed in 2014 and released their sixth album, Coward, in 2015. Their seventh and latest album, Dissenter, was released in May 2026.

== History ==
Haste the Day formed in 2001 in Carmel, Indiana. The name was discovered by Devin Chaulk who read it from the hymn "It Is Well with My Soul." The band originally started out as a three-piece including: Brennan Chaulk (guitar/vocals), Devin Chaulk (drums/vocals), and Mike Murphy (bass/vocals). Six months after forming, the band added longtime friend Jason Barnes to the group as a second guitarist. In 2002, the band recruited Jimmy Ryan as their lead vocalist who was member of the death metal band Upheaval from 1997 until 1999. According to Ryan, he met Barnes at a bible study and recognized him, which led to the invitation to join the band. In the summer of 2002, the band self-produced their first EP, That They May Know You with the song "Substance" acting as the lead single. A year later Haste the Day signed with Tooth & Nail Records subsidiary Solid State Records.

After signing to Solid State, Haste the Day went on to record their debut album, Burning Bridges which was released on March 9, 2004, in the band's old high school cafeteria at Carmel High School. The band made two music videos for the songs "The Closest Thing To Closure" and "American Love". After a year, Haste the Day released When Everything Falls. The album hit stores on June 28, 2005. A music video was made for the title track. The band toured heavily in support of this album and gained worldwide recognition.

In late 2005, Jimmy Ryan announced his decision to leave Haste the Day. Soon thereafter he got married, accepted a position at Tooth & Nail Records, and started a new band called Trenches. His last show with Haste the Day was in the band's hometown of Indianapolis on December 30, 2005, although he came on stage for a song during their show at the Napalm & Noise Tour on November 28, 2009, in Indianapolis and at their final show in Indianapolis on March 11, 2011.

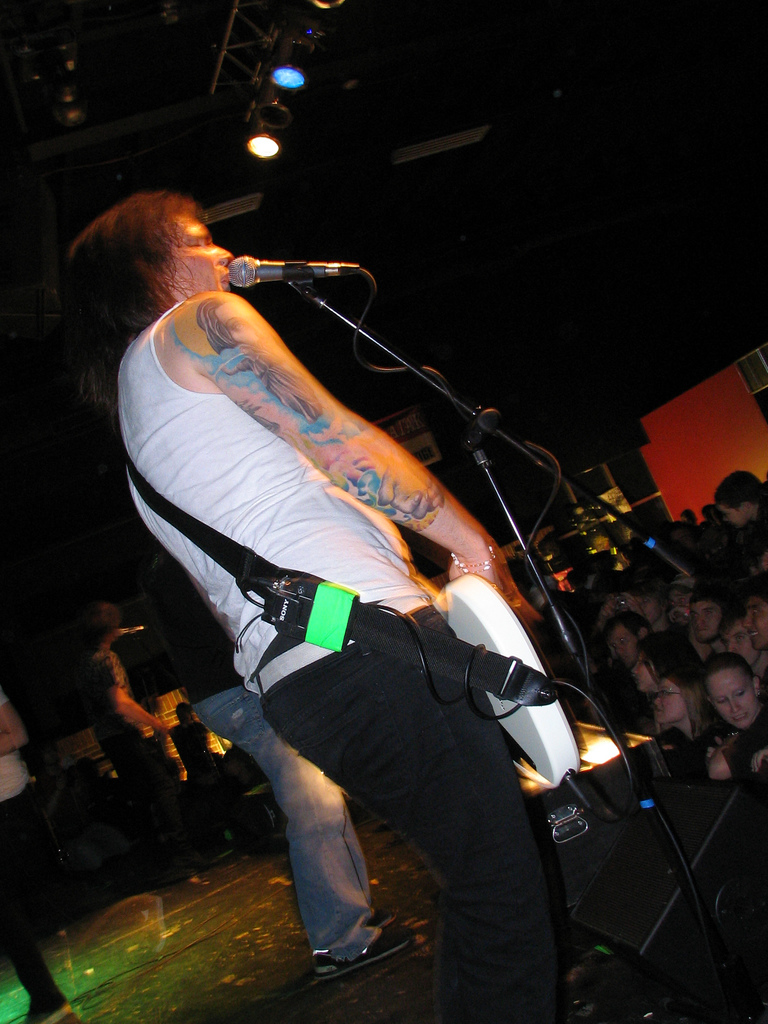
Haste the Day in 2007

The remaining members continued on for the European tour with The Juliana Theory, accompanied by Stephen Keech of Denver-based Christian metal band New Day Awakening. On February 23, 2006, Haste the Day stated in a press release that they had officially made Keech their new permanent singer.

Haste the Day released a DVD as part of the special edition of their third full-length album Pressure the Hinges. The DVD features all of the band's current music videos, live footage including Jimmy Ryan's last show, a show with Stephen Keech from The Truth Tour (w/ Bleeding Through, Between the Buried and Me, and Every Time I Die), and behind the scenes antics (such as prank OnStar calls). The DVD was produced by Full Lock Media.

After releasing Pressure the Hinges and finishing up the 12 Days of Christmas tour with Calico System, Heavy Heavy Low Low and Flee the Seen, the band began another tour with From Autumn to Ashes and Maylene and the Sons of Disaster.

The band spent the summer of 2007 on the Vans Warped Tour followed by a month on the road with Atreyu. Haste the Day finished off 2007 with a full national tour with As I Lay Dying before taking some time off for Christmas. In January 2008, Haste the Day went on a full American tour with Scary Kids Scaring Kids, Drop Dead, Gorgeous and fellow Indianapolis band, Gwen Stacy.

Haste the Day was featured on the album It's a Punk Rock Christmas. as the song "O come, O come, Emmanuel" was covered and released on the album.

On July 17, 2008, the band announced that guitarist Jason Barnes was asked to step down from Haste the Day because he is no longer of the Christian faith. The band went on to state that they would not be replacing him, but would instead have Dave Krysl, a friend of the band, take on full-time touring guitar duties. On August 12, 2008, a new song entitled "68" was posted on their Myspace page.

From October to November 2008, Haste the Day performed on Norma Jean's "The Anti–Mother Tour". The tour also included several bands on Solid State Records such as The Showdown, Mychildren Mybride, Children 18:3, and Oh, Sleeper.

On October 14, 2008, Haste the Day's fourth studio album Dreamer was released on Solid State Records. The album, being the first to not feature Barnes, saw a lead guitar performance by former Scarlet and Spitfire guitarist Randy Vanderbilt. The band announced that the 12 Days of Christmas tour would mark the final shows that drummer Devin Chaulk would play with the band, as he felt that he was being called to depart. Chaulk explained in an interview that his decision weighed on him to leave to focus on his new marriage at the time and to avoid holding the band back. On December 20, 2008, the band played their last show with Devin Chaulk in Indianapolis. Giuseppe Capolupo, formerly of Demise of Eros and Once Nothing, took his place on drums soon after.

On February 24, 2009, the music video for their single "Mad Man" appeared on their MySpace profile. The band began touring on the Saints and Sinners Tour along with Brokencyde, Senses Fail and Hollywood Undead on February 27, 2009. In May 2009, they participated in a six-show tour in South Africa, with their first show on May 8 in Johannesburg, and ending the tour in Cape Town on May 16. Partially through the 2009 Scream the Prayer Tour, Brennan Chaulk left the band because of personal reasons and to pursue writing Christian worship music. Mike Murphy became the only original member of Haste the Day. Although no specific announcement was made, touring lead guitar player Dave Krysl (ex–New Day Awakening) became a full-time member after the Scream the Prayer Tour. Blake Martin of A Plea for Purging was asked to fill the position of rhythm guitar that Chaulk had left vacant. The band later would get Scott Whelan, formerly of Phinehas, as their permanent new guitarist.

Haste the Day recorded their fifth album Attack of the Wolf King at Andreas Magnusson's studio in Richmond, Virginia, and the album was released on June 29, 2010. The first single, "Travesty" was released to their MySpace profile on May 4, 2010. On June 29, 2010, Haste the Day celebrated the release of Attack of the Wolf King in Bloomington, Indiana, which the original lineup (Jimmy, Brennan, Jason, Mike and Devin) coming back to perform on stage for the first time since December 2005, playing songs from the band's first three releases. The most recent Haste the Day lineup played the newer songs. The show was filmed for a DVD release. Haste the Day headlined a tour to support the album's release with MyChildren MyBride and Upon a Burning Body. Attack of the Wolf King was released on June 29, 2010. Haste the Day played on the Glamour Kills Stage on the Vans Warped Tour, followed by the Destabilize North America Tour with Enter Shikari in October through November.

The band announced their break-up on November 22, 2010. According to Keech, after he had joined the band, he, Murphy, and the band's manager Mark Lafay, made an agreement that if one of them were to leave, the band would cease. Lafay made the decision to leave the management industry, which led to the band disbanding out of respect for the agreement, as well as accepting that the band would have ended eventually. Lafay clarified the comment about his willingness to continue with the band until he could find a replacement manager, however, he stated he believed that the members were ready to move on with their life. The next day, November 23, the first three full-length albums were re-released in one package entitled Concerning the Way It Was. Their farewell tour was during February–March 2011, with support from MyChildren MyBride, The Chariot and A Plea for Purging. At their final show in Indianapolis on March 11, 2011, the original lineup performed the song "Substance".

The band released a live CD and DVD album, Haste the Day vs. Haste the Day, on September 13, 2011. It features the original band members and the final line-up of the band performing at their show in Bloomington, Indiana on June 29, 2010. The band released a picture on January 20, 2014, of a date-stamped white board reading "setlist" and on January 29, 2014, a new band website was created to allow visitors to sign up for email updates.

On February 14, 2014, it was announced that Haste the Day would reform for one night on May 2, 2014, with its original lineup to celebrate the 10th anniversary of the album Burning Bridges. The band later announced that they would be recording a new album with some of the original members and some of the Attack of the Wolf King line-up. Vocalist Stephen Keech was announced to produce the album, with Matt Goldman doing the mixing. Another announcement set the album's release by Solid State Records on May 19, 2015. According to a photo posted May 28, 2015, by the band on their Facebook page, the album "Coward" was fiftieth overall on Billboard charts, second on Christian charts, seventh on Hard Rock charts, sixteenth on Rock charts, and seventh on the Internet overall.

On February 3, 2023, it was announced the band would reunite for the first time in seven years to play the 2023 Furnace Fest. Afterwards, on August 13, 2024, via email newsletter the band announced they are working on a new album. On October 18, 2024, the band released the first single for the upcoming album, Burn, alongside its music video. The band eventually stated that the album, titled Dissenter, would be released on May 1, 2026.

== Band members ==
Current members

Name	Instrument	Years	Other projects
Stephen Keech	lead vocals	2006–2011, 2014–2016, 2023–present	New Day Awakening, As Cities Burn
Brennan Chaulk	rhythm guitar, clean vocals	2001–2009, 2014–2016, 2023–present	Beyond Oceans
Scott Whelan	guitar, backing vocals	2009–2011, 2014–2016, 2023–present	Phinehas, Sleep Still
Dave Krysl	lead guitar	2009–2011, 2014–2016, 2023–present	New Day Awakening
Mike Murphy	bass, backing vocals	2001–2011, 2014–2016, 2023–present	
Giuseppe "Joey" Antonio Capolupo	drums, percussion	2009–2011, 2014–2016, 2023–present	Once Nothing, Demise of Eros, Gypsy and his band of Ghosts, The Devil Wears Prada

Former members

Name	Instrument	Years	Other projects
Jimmy Ryan	lead vocals	2002–2005, 2014–2016, 2023	Trenches, Upheaval
Devin Chaulk	drums, percussion, clean vocals	2001–2008, 2016, 2023	
Jason Barnes	lead guitar	2001–2008, 2016	Beyond Oceans

Touring musicians

Name	Instrument	Years	Other projects
Matt Marquez	drums	2008–2009	Norma Jean, Heartist, Nevea Tears
Blake Martin	rhythm guitar	2009	A Plea for Purging

== Discography ==
Studio albums

Year	Title	Label	Chart peaks						
Year	Title	Label	US	US Heat	US Rock	US Hard Rock	Christian	Independent	Album Sales
2004	Burning Bridges	Solid State Records	—	—	—	—	—	—	—
2005	When Everything Falls	Solid State Records	175	6	—	—	5	—	—
2007	Pressure the Hinges	Solid State Records	89	—	—	—	3	—	89
2008	Dreamer	Solid State Records	68	—	—	—	3	—	68
2010	Attack of the Wolf King	Solid State Records	74	—	19	7	3	—	74
2015	Coward	Solid State Records	105	—	16	7	2	13	53
2026	Dissenter	Solid State Records	—	—	—	—	—	—	—

Extended plays

- That They May Know You (2002)

Compilation albums

- Concerning the Way It Was (2010)
- Best of the Best (2012)
- The Ultimate Playlist (2016)

Live albums

- Haste the Day vs. Haste the Day (2011)

Singles

- "Long Way Down" (2005)
- "Stitches" / "Deth Kult Social Club" (2007; Split 7" with From Autumn To Ashes)
- "Mad Man" (2008)
- "Travesty" (2010)
- "World" (2015)
- "Burn" (2024)
- "Shallows" (2026)
- "Oblivion" (2026)

Music videos

- "The Closest Thing To Closure" (2004)
- "American Love" (2004)
- "When Everything Falls" (2005)
- "Stiches" (2007)
- "Mad Man" (2008)
- "Burn" (2024)
- "Liminal" (2026)
