= Till the End (album) =

Studio album by Phinehas
- Released: July 10, 2015
- Genre: Metalcore; Christian metal
- Length: 42:01
- Label: Artery

Phinehas chronology
The Last Word Is Yours to Speak (2013)	Till the End (2015)	Fight Through the Night (2016)

Singles from Till the End
- 1. "Dead Choir" Released: May 4, 2015; 2. "Tetelestai" Released: June 9, 2015; 3. "White Livered" Released: July 13, 2015

Till the End is the third studio album by American metalcore band Phinehas. The album was released on July 10, 2015, through Artery Recordings and is the band's only album through the label. The album debuted at no. 2 on the Billboard Top Christian Albums chart.

== Background and promotion ==
At the end of 2014, Phinehas announced they would begin working on their third studio album after concluding their tour for The Last Word Is Yours to Speak. On February 17, 2015, the band announced they had signed to Artery Recordings after their previous label, Red Cord Records, dissolved into Victory Records. On May 4, Phinehas released the first single "Dead Choir" and announced the album itself along with the release date. On June 9, the band released the live music video for the song "Tetelestai". On July 13, three days after the album's release, the band unveiled a music video for the third single, "White Livered".

Professional ratings
Review scores
Source	Rating
Artistdirect	Recommended
New Noise	3/5 stars

== Track listing ==
No.	Title	Length
1.	"Dead Choir"	3:32
2.	"White Livered" (featuring Dominic Dickinson of Affiance)	3:04
3.	"Truth Be Told"	3:40
4.	"Non"	1:27
5.	"Forever West"	3:30
6.	"Tetelestai"	3:48
7.	"Coup de Grâce"	2:54
8.	"Omnis"	1:28
9.	"Seven"	6:42
10.	"Iliaster (More Than Skin)"	3:24
11.	"Evening Gray and Morning Red"	3:19
12.	"Moriar"	1:49
13.	"Till the End"	3:19
Total length:		42:01

== Personnel ==
Phinehas

- Sean McCulloch – lead vocals
- Daniel Gailey – guitars, backing vocals
- Bryce Kelley – bass, backing vocals
- Lee Humerian – drums, backing vocals

Additional musicians

- Dominic Dickinson of Affiance – guest guitar on track 2

== Charts ==
Chart (2015)	Peak Position
U.S. Billboard Hard Rock Albums	5
U.S. Billboard Independent Albums	12
U.S. Billboard Top Album Sales	89
U.S. Billboard Top Christian Albums	2
U.S. Billboard Top Rock Albums	21
