= Conditions (band) =

American rock band

- Origin: Richmond, Virginia
- Genres: Punk rock, post hardcore, pop punk
- Years active: 2006–2014; 2018–Present
- Label: Good Fight Music Entertainment One
- Past members: Brandon Roundtree; Alex Howard; Corey Thomas; Ryan Tinsley; Jason Marshall; Joshua Thomas; Dave Haygood; Riley Emminger

Conditions is an American rock band from Richmond, Virginia.

Conditions was founded in 2006 by members of the previous local bands Motion Picture Demise, Race the Sun, Scarlet and Forever in a Day (FIAD). The group released its first recorded material in 2007 and played Bamboozle and Warped Tour that same year.

The group signed with Good Fight Music and released their debut full-length, Fluorescent Youth, in September 2010. This album drew comparisons to bands such as Anberlin, Ivoryline, and Saosin. Their sophomore effort, Full of War, followed in March 2013. On November 7, 2013, the band announced on their Facebook page that they were breaking up. Later on July 12, 2014, the band played their farewell show and officially broke up.

On September 4, 2015, the band reunited to play a five-year anniversary show at the Canal Club in Richmond, Virginia.

On April 15, 2016, the band announced through Twitter and Facebook that they would be performing three shows on June 9, 10, and 11 in Philadelphia, New York City and RVA respectively.

On April 27, 2018, the band announced on their Facebook page that they were in a studio in Baltimore for the weekend and were going to "see what happens". Also, they noted they wanted to visit Brazil. This recording session lead to the release of the single, "Give It All."

In 2020, the band released a 10-year anniversary edition of their album, Fluorescent Youth, which features an additional two bonus tracks.

In August 2025, the band announced a reunion show at Canal Club in Richmond, Virginia, supported by American Dream Machine and The Fan, to celebrate the 15th anniversary of Fluorescent Youth.

On November 7, 2025, Conditions released a new single, "Belong Forever".

== Members ==
Last known lineup

- Brandon Roundtree – lead vocals (2006–present) (ex-Scarlet)
- Alex Howard – guitar, vocals (2006–present) (Touring bassist for Jelly Roll, former guitarist for Sleeping with Sirens)
- Corey Thomas – bass guitar (2009–present)
- Ryan Tinsley – drums (2006–present)
- Jason Marshall – guitar, vocals (2006–2012, 2015–present)

Former

- Joshua Thomas – bass guitar (2006–2007)
- Dave Haygood - guitar (2006–2007)
- Riley Emminger – bass guitar (2007–2009)

== Discography ==
Albums

- Fluorescent Youth (Good Fight Music, 2010) U.S. Billboard Heatseekers #42
- Full of War (Good Fight Music, 2013) U.S. Heatseekers #13
- Missing Hours (Good Fight Music, 2014)

EPs

- Conditions EP (Self-released, 2008)
- You Are Forgotten EP (Self-released, 2009)
- 2009 Digital EP (Self-released, 2009)
