= Dreamer (Haste the Day album) =

Studio album by Haste the Day
- Released: October 14, 2008
- Recorded: April–June 2008, Azmyth Recording (Indianapolis, Indiana)
- Genre: Metalcore
- Length: 38:01
- Label: Solid State
- Producer: Andreas Lars Magnusson

Haste the Day chronology
Pressure the Hinges (2007)	Dreamer (2008)	Attack of the Wolf King (2010)

Alternative Cover
- Digital re-release cover

Professional ratings
Review scores
Source	Rating
411mania	8/10 stars
AbsolutePunk	61%
Alt Press	2/5 stars
Decoy Music	2/5 stars
Jesus Freak Hideout	4.5/5 stars

Dreamer is the fourth studio album by Christian metalcore band Haste the Day. The album was released on October 14, 2008 through Solid State Records. A song from the album, entitled "68" was released on the band's MySpace on August 1. A second new song, the second track off the album entitled "Mad Man," was made available for download on iTunes September 9. The third song Haste the Day has announced the release of is "Haunting," which was posted on the band's Myspace on September 6, 2008. The final track on the album, "Autumn" is a short acoustic re-recording of a track originally from Haste the Day's first release That They May Know You. They released a music video for the song Mad Man on February 24, 2009. This is the last album to feature Devin Chaulk, Brennan Chaulk and Jason Barnes (although Jason Barnes went uncredited; he had been fired from the band earlier in the year after having decided to become an atheist).

The album sold 7,700 copies in the United States in its first week of release to debut at position No. 68 on the Billboard 200 chart.

On March 2, 2010, the album was released digitally with new artwork and two acoustic bonus tracks.

== Track listing ==
No.	Title	Length
1.	"68"	3:25
2.	"Mad Man"	3:32
3.	"Haunting"	4:01
4.	"Resolve"	2:55
5.	"An Adult Tree"	5:10
6.	"Babylon"	3:29
7.	"Invoke Reform"	3:03
8.	"Sons of the Fallen Nation"	3:20
9.	"Labyrinth"	2:35
10.	"Porcelain"	3:29
11.	"Autumn"	3:02
Total length:		38:01

== Digital re-release ==
1. "An Adult Tree (acoustic)"
2. "Haunting (acoustic)"

== Credits ==
Haste the Day

- Stephen Keech – unclean vocals, additional guitars
- Brennan Chaulk – lead/rhythm guitar, clean vocals
- Michael Murphy – bass guitar, backing vocals
- Devin Chaulk – drums, backing vocals

Production

- Andreas Lars Magnusson - producer, engineering, mixing
- Chris Dowhan - assistant engineering
- UE Nastasi - mastering
- Ryan Clark for Invisible Creature - illustration, design, art direction
- Ryan Adkins - studio manager
- Adam Zeigler - runner
- Recorded at Azmyth Recording, Indianapolis, Indiana
- Mixed at Planet Red Studios, Richmond, Virginia
- Mastered at Sterling Sound, New York City
