= Burning Bridges (Haste the Day album) =

Studio album by Haste the Day
- Released: March 9, 2004
- Genre: Metalcore, Christian metal
- Length: 43:48
- Label: Solid State
- Producer: Barry Poynter

Haste the Day chronology
| That They May Know You (2002) | Burning Bridges (2004) | When Everything Falls (2005) |

Professional ratings
Review scores
| Source | Rating |
|---|---|
| AllMusic | 3/5 stars |

Burning Bridges is Haste the Day's debut full-length album. It was released on March 9, 2004, through Solid State Records. Music videos were released for "The Closest Thing to Closure" and "American Love".

== Track listing ==
All tracks are written by Haste the Day.

| No. | Title | Length |
|---|---|---|
| 1. | "Blue 42" | 5:08 |
| 2. | "The Closest Thing to Closure" | 2:34 |
| 3. | "American Love" | 4:54 |
| 4. | "Concerning the Way It Was" | 1:53 |
| 5. | "Song of Faith" | 4:53 |
| 6. | "Ros King" | 1:49 |
| 7. | "One Life to Live" | 2:23 |
| 8. | "The Last Goodbye" | 2:47 |
| 9. | "An Honest Confession" | 2:46 |
| 10. | "Substance" | 3:41 |
| 11. | "Breaking My Own Heart" | 2:50 |
| 12. | "Outro" | 8:04 |
| Total length: | | 43:49 |

== Credits ==
Haste the Day

- Jimmy Ryan – unclean vocals
- Brennan Chaulk – rhythm guitar, clean vocals
- Jason Barnes – lead guitar
- Michael Murphy – bass guitar, backing clean vocals
- Devin Chaulk – drums, clean vocals

Additional musicians

- Lance Garvin – backing vocals
- Arthur Green – backing vocals

Production

- Roy Culver – executive producer
- Troy Glessner – mastering
- Barry Poynter – engineer, mixing, producer
- Zaine Tarpo – A&R
