= Fight Through the Night =

EP by Phinehas
- Released: December 16, 2016
- Recorded: 2016
- Studio: Steve's Wii Palace
- Genre: Acoustic
- Length: 22:05
- Label: Self-released
- Producer: Phinehas

Phinehas chronology
Till the End (2015)	Fight Through the Night (2016)	Dark Flag (2017)

Fight Through the Night is the third EP by American metalcore band Phinehas, produced and released by the band on December 16, 2016.

== Composition ==
Fight Through the Night features acoustic versions of "Forever West", "Dead Choir", and "Seven" from Till the End. The EP also features three new acoustic tracks: "Cessation of Breathing", "Selah", and "Book of Names". The last track, "Book of Names", features guest vocals from Garrett Russell of Silent Planet.

== Track listing ==
All lyrics are written by Phinehas; all music is composed by Phinehas.

No.	Title	Length
1.	"Cessation of Breathing"	2:25
2.	"Forever West" (acoustic version)	3:46
3.	"Dead Choir" (acoustic version)	4:21
4.	"Selah"	1:32
5.	"Seven" (acoustic version)	4:45
6.	"Book of Names" (featuring Garrett Russell of Silent Planet)	5:12
Total length:		22:05

== Personnel ==
Phinehas

- Sean McCulloch – lead vocals, artwork
- Daniel Gailey – guitars, backing vocals, engineering, mixing, mastering
- Bryce Kelley – bass, backing vocals
- Lee Humerian – drums, backing vocals

Additional musicians

- Garrett Russell of Silent Planet – guest vocals on track 6
