= The Last Word Is Yours to Speak =

Studio album by Phinehas
- Released: July 23, 2013
- Genres: Metalcore; Christian metal
- Length: 48:15
- Label: Red Cord
- Producers: Chris Galvez; Phinehas

Phinehas chronology
The Bridge Between (2013)	The Last Word Is Yours to Speak (2013)	Till the End (2015)

Singles from The Last Word Is Yours to Speak
- 1. "Fleshkiller" Released: May 17, 2013; 2. "Blood on My Knuckles" Released: May 19, 2014

The Last Word Is Yours to Speak is the second studio album by American metalcore band Phinehas. The album was released on July 23, 2013, through Red Cord Records. It was produced by the band themselves and Chris Galvez. This is the first release with bassist Bryce Kelley and the last with guitarist Jason Combs.

== Background and promotion ==
The album was recorded in early 2013 shortly following the release of The Bridge Between. The album's name was announced on May 17 with the release of the lead single, "Fleshkiller". A music video was released for the song on July 19 through Red Cord's YouTube channel. The Last Word Is Yours to Speak was released on July 23 through Red Cord Records and proved to be successful upon release, charting on the Billboard Top Heatseekers chart and Top Christian Albums. The Last Word Is Yours to Speak was also issued as a 12" vinyl, with 150 colored red and 250 colored gold. A music video for "Blood on My Knuckles" was released on May 19, 2014. With the announcement of the video's release, the band announced a contest in which the winner will win a signed drum head that was used in the recording of the album.

== Critical reception ==
Professional ratings
Review scores
Source	Rating
Decoy Music	3.5/4 stars
HM Magazine	4.5/5 stars
Indie Vision Music	4/5 stars

The Last Word Is Yours to Speak has received positive reviews since its release, with critics praising the album. Decoy Music reviewer Nick Senior praised the album saying "the guitars really stand out from the crowd" and complemented the Southern rock influences. Senior also noted the post-metal influences on "Dyson Sphere", saying it "really drive[s] home the power of the track". However, he did note that a few of the tracks are "standard fare" and the breakdowns (while not overused) killed the momentum of a few songs. HM Magazine reviewer Wes Jaques also praised the album, saying "Fleshkiller" had "riffs in the style of Cannibal Corpse" as well as "non-rhythmic patterns like Hatebreed-gone-death metal". Jaques called the album a "solid release", citing "The Blessing and the Curse" as his favorite track. Indie Vision Music reviewer Brody B. also noted the Southern rock influence on "Blood on My Knuckles" and praised Humerian's drumming. Brody said the tracks "From a Burning Sun" and "The Deepest of Graves" could have easily been lift out of the album, but did say the breakdown from the former "is really slick". He concluded his review by saying the band "are the real deal and meant to break free from this monotonous music scene into the limelight."

== Track listing ==
All lyrics are written by Sean McCulloch; all music is composed by Phinehas.

No.	Title	Length
1.	"Throes" (intro)	0:54
2.	"Fleshkiller"	3:53
3.	"The Deepest of Graves"	3:32
4.	"Blood on My Knuckles"	3:32
5.	"Twisted"	3:38
6.	"De el Quatro" (instrumental)	2:13
7.	"Out of the Dust"	3:20
8.	"The Blessing and the Curse" (featuring Brennan Chaulk of Haste the Day)	3:55
9.	"Dyson Sphere" (featuring Garrett Russell of Silent Planet)	5:11
10.	"Manipulator's Wire"	3:55
11.	"Salting the Mine"	3:38
12.	"From a Burning Sun"	5:10
13.	"WWII"	5:19
Total length:		48:15

== Personnel ==
Credits adapted from AllMusic.

Phinehas

- Sean McCulloch – lead vocals, guitar engineering
- Jason Combs – guitars
- Bryce Kelley – bass, backing vocals
- Lee Humerian – drums, backing vocals, engineering

Additional musicians

- Brennan Chaulk of Haste the Day – guest vocals on track 8
- Garrett Russell of Silent Planet – guest vocals on track 9
- Drew Williams – additional vocals

Additional personnel

- Chris Galvez – engineering, production, additional vocals
- Phinehas – production
- Joey Matthews – executive production
- Joe Wohletz – mastering, mixing, editing
- Joel Wanasek – mastering, mixing
- Chris McCulloch – handwriting
- Trent Tieso – artwork

== Charts ==
Chart (2013)	Peak positions
U.S. Billboard Top Heatseekers	34
U.S. Billboard Top Christian Albums	41
