= Trenches (band) =

American metal band

- Origin: Indianapolis, Indiana, U.S.
- Genres: Post-metal, sludge metal, metalcore
- Years active: 2007–2010, 2012–2023
- Label: Solid State
- Members: Jimmy Ryan; Bill Scott; Joel David Lauver; Dyllen Jerome Nance; Ross Montgomery; Carey Stilts
- Past members: Phil Hook; Eli Larch Chastain; Zach Frizzell
- Website: Trenches on Facebook

Trenches was an American metal band formed by Haste the Day vocalist Jimmy Ryan. They released two studio albums, The Tide Will Swallow Us Whole in 2008 and Reckoner in 2022.

== History ==
Jimmy Ryan, a member of Haste the Day, at the time, decided to depart the band, when they were in Indianapolis, Indiana on December 30, 2005, doing a concert, where he is a native of the city. The group was formed, when Ryan selected Joel David Lauver to be a guitarist, keyboardist, and vocalist, Eli Larch Chastain to be a guitarist, Bill Scott to be a bassist, and Phil Hook to be their drummer.

Trenches commenced as a musical entity, in 2007, with their first studio album, The Tide Will Swallow Us Whole, that released on September 16, 2008, by Solid State Records. Their first concert occurred in the city of Noblesville, Indiana, on November 24, 2007. The band's national debut was during a performance at the Cornerstone Festival, the subsequent year. Trenches was to perform, in 2009, at the same festival, yet they were replaced on the lineup listing.

The band announced their hiatus in 2010 before getting back together in early 2012. The band released one more full-length album, Reckoner, before they split up again in 2023.

== Members ==
Final lineup

- Jimmy Ryan – vocals (2007–2010, 2012–2023)
- Bill Scott – bass (2007–2010, 2012–2023)
- Joel David Lauver – guitars, vocals, programming, keyboards (2007–2010, 2012–2023)
- Dyllen Jerome Nance – drums (2017–2023)
- Ross Montgomery – guitars (2020–2023)
- Carey Stilts – guitars (2020–2023)

Former

- Phil Hook – drums (2007–2010, 2012–2013)
- Eli Larch Chastain – guitar (2007–2010, 2012–2014)
- Zach Frizzell – drums (2013–2015)

Session

- Dave Powell – drums (Emery) (2013)

Timeline

== Discography ==
Studio albums

- The Tide Will Swallow Us Whole (September 16, 2008, Solid State)
- Reckoner (January 1, 2022)

Singles

- "The Death of All Mammoths" (August 4, 2016, Independent)
