= When Everything Falls =

2005 studio album by Haste the Day

Studio album by Haste the Day
- Released: June 28, 2005
- Genre: Metalcore, Christian metal
- Length: 35:46
- Label: Solid State
- Producer: Garth Richardson

Haste the Day chronology
Burning Bridges (2004)	When Everything Falls (2005)	Pressure the Hinges (2007)

Professional ratings
Review scores
Source	Rating
AbsolutePunk.net	(86%)
AllMusic	3.5/5 stars

When Everything Falls is Haste the Day's second studio album. It was released on June 28, 2005, through Solid State Records. This was the last record to feature the band's original vocalist Jimmy Ryan until their 2015 release Coward.

By January 2006, the album had sold over 40,000 copies.

== Track listing ==
No.	Title	Length
1.	"Fallen"	2:41
2.	"The Perfect Night"	2:57
3.	"Walk On"	2:55
4.	"When Everything Falls"	4:11
5.	"If I Could See"	2:58
6.	"Walls and Fear"	2:47
7.	"For a Lifetime" (featuring Francis Mark of From Autumn to Ashes)	3:23
8.	"This Time It's Real"	3:12
9.	"Bleed Alone"	2:13
10.	"InstruMETAL"	2:04
11.	"All I Have"	3:13
12.	"Long Way Down" (Goo Goo Dolls cover)	3:12
Total length:		35:46

== Credits ==
Haste the Day

- Jimmy Ryan – unclean vocals
- Brennan Chaulk – clean vocals, rhythm guitar
- Jason Barnes – lead guitar
- Michael Murphy – bass guitar, backing vocals
- Devin Chaulk – drums, clean vocals

Additional musicians

- Francis Mark (From Autumn to Ashes) – Guest vocals on "For a Lifetime"

Production

- Garth Richardson – producer, engineering
- Dean Maher – mixing
- Josh Wilbur – mixing
- Howie Weinberg – mastering
- Asterik studio – Art direction, design
