= Dissenter (album) =

Studio album by Haste the Day
- Released: May 1, 2026
- Length: 39:08
- Label: Solid State
- Producer: Stephen Keech

Haste the Day chronology
Coward (2015)	Dissenter (2026)

Singles from Dissenter
- 1. "Burn" Released: October 18, 2024; 2. "Shallows" Released: February 6, 2026; 3. "Oblivion" Released: March 20, 2026

Dissenter is the seventh studio album by the American metalcore band Haste the Day. The album was released on May 1, 2026, by Solid State Records. Released eleven years after Coward (2015), it was the longest gap between studio albums in the band's career.

== Background and promotion ==
In 2016, following the release of Coward, Haste the Day disbanded for the second time. On February 3, 2023, it was announced that they would reunite for the first time in seven years to play the 2023 Furnace Fest. Shortly afterwards, on August 13, 2024, via email newsletter, Haste the Day announced they are working on a new album. On October 18, 2024, the band released the first single for the upcoming album, Burn, alongside its music video. On February 6, 2026, Haste the Day announced that the album, titled Dissenter, would be released on May 1, 2026 and released its second single "Shallows". Twenty days later, they released the music video for the song "Liminal" featuring Silent Planet. On March 20, 2026, they released the third single "Oblivion".

== Track listing ==
All tracks are written by Haste the Day.

Dissenter track listing
No.	Title	Length
1.	"Cycles"	1:17
2.	"Shallows"	3:50
3.	"Grave"	3:45
4.	"Burn"	4:08
5.	"Liminal" (featuring Silent Planet)	3:29
6.	"Gnasher"	3:09
7.	"Heretic"	2:04
8.	"Escape"	3:52
9.	"Adrift"	3:42
10.	"Teeth"	4:11
11.	"Oblivion"	5:41
Total length:		39:08

== Personnel ==
Credits are adapted from Tidal.

=== Haste the Day ===
- Stephen Keech – lead vocals, production, engineering
- Brennan Chaulk – electric guitar, clean vocals
- Scott Whelan – electric guitar
- Dave Krysl – electric guitar
- Michael Murphy – bass guitar, background vocals
- Giuseppe Capolupo – drums, percussion

=== Additional contributors ===
- Machine – mixing
- Garrett Russell – lead vocals on "Liminal"
