= The Tide Will Swallow Us Whole =

Studio album by Trenches
- Released: September 16, 2008
- Genre: Post-metal, sludge metal, metalcore
- Length: 54:57
- Label: Solid State
- Producer: Jimmy Ryan

Trenches chronology
The Tide Will Swallow Us Whole (2008)	Reckoner (2022)

Professional ratings
Review scores
Source	Rating
Driven Far Off	9.5/10 stars
Punkbands.com	4/5 stars
Jesus Freak Hideout	3/5 stars

The Tide Will Swallow Us Whole is the debut album by American band Trenches. It was originally titled "950 Times Per Second", possibly as a reference to the rate at which a black hole allegedly spins.

== Track listing ==
1. "Calling" – 3:42 (featuring Ryan Clark of Demon Hunter)
2. "Eyes Open" – 3:21
3. "Sacrament" – 4:01
4. "Trip the Landmine" – 4:09
5. "Pathways" – 4:52
6. "Bittersweet" – 7:14
7. "Call It Correct" – 6:17
8. "End" – 4:08
9. "Ocean Currents" – 3:42
10. "Cornered" – 13:32

== Awards ==
In 2009, the album was nominated for a Dove Award for Recorded Music Packaging of the Year at the 40th GMA Dove Awards.

== Credits ==
Trenches

- Bill Scott – bass
- Phil Hook – drums
- Jimmy Ryan – vocals
- Eli Larch Chastain – guitars
- Joel David Lauver – guitars, backing vocals, programming, keyboards

Additional musicians

- Ryan Clark – guest vocals on "Calling", design

Production

- Invisible Creature – art direction
- Jr McNeely – mixing
- Troy Glessner – mastering
