= Jimmy Ryan (vocalist) =

American singer (born 1978)

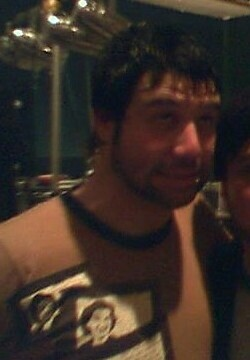
- Ryan in the 2000s

Background information
- Born: James Christopher Ryan; 1978 (age 47–48)
- Genres: Christian metal; heavy metal; sludge metal; metalcore; post-hardcore
- Occupation: Singer
- Years active: 1997–present
- Formerly of: Haste the Day; Trenches; Upheaval; Anapparatus

James Christopher Ryan is an American singer. He is the original vocalist for the heavy metal bands Haste the Day, Trenches, and Upheaval.

== History ==
Ryan began in the hardcore punk scene when he was 13, identifying with the straight edge and vegan culture. Although raised Catholic, he regarded organized religion as an authority figure to rebel against. Eventually, Ryan formed Upheaval with Brian Allen (bass), Jeremy King (drums), Nathan Stambro (guitars) and Ben Parrish (guitars) (also in Demiricous) in 1997. The band recorded their debut EP, Downfall of the Ascendancy of Man in 1997. In 1999, Ryan left the band along with Allen, and were replaced by Drew and Bryan Grimes. The band had been signed with Eulogy Recordings until Ryan quit the band and started on the path of becoming a Christian.

In 2002, Ryan joined Christian metal outfit, Haste the Day, being 8 years older than all the members except for the drummer, Devin Chaulk. At the time, the band members were in college at Moody Bible College and IUPUI, apart from Ryan. When the band began touring, the members left college and Ryan called off an engagement. The band recorded an EP, That They May Know You, in 2002. While in conversation with Solid State Records, the band began recording with Barry Poynter for their debut album, Burning Bridges. The band would go to record their sophomore album, When Everything Falls, with Garth Richardson (Rage Against the Machine) in Vancouver, Canada. Ryan also appeared on Zao's The Lesser Lights of Heaven DVD, which released in 2005.

In 2005, Ryan quit the band to focus on his relationship, being replaced by ex-New Day Awakening vocalist Stephen Keech. Years later, Ryan claims that his biggest regret in life was that he left the band, however, feels that it was the best decision for the band. Following his exit from the band, he briefly worked for Starbucks before leaving to work for Tooth & Nail Records, working as an assistant for the A&R representative Chad Johnson. He worked for the company, working behind the scenes with Underoath, Norma Jean, and Emery before moving back to Indianapolis. While in Indianapolis, he found Cry of the Afflicted and multiple other acts. A year after leaving Haste the Day, Ryan formed Trenches with Phil Hook, Eli Larch Chastain, Bill Scott, and Joel David Lauver. In 2008, the band released their debut album The Tide Will Swallow Us Whole through Solid State Records. The band stated on their Facebook page they were working on a new EP that was to be titled, Reckoner, but Lauver's personal page stated that Trenches had disbanded. After a brief amount of time back home, he moved to Nashville, Tennessee to work with Johnson once again. He quit working with Tooth & Nail to work as a youth pastor at a church in Nashville for a brief time before touring with Jeremy Camp, a close friend since he was 18, as an assistant.

In 2012, the band stated they had reunited and were working on the Reckoner album. In 2014, he later rejoined Haste the Day, being featured on the band's 2015 release, Coward. In 2016, the band re-entered into a hiatus, while Trenches continued working on their next album. In 2022, Trenches released Reckoner, through their independent label, Noise Order. In 2023, Haste the Day and Trenches performed at Furnace Fest, where Ryan made guest appearances with Haste the Day. Following the festival, Ryan shared that he would no longer make appearances with Haste the Day and that Trenches was on an indefinite hiatus.

== Personal life ==
Ryan was married in early 2005 following his departure from Haste the Day. During his time working with Jeremy Camp, the two ended up getting a divorce. Ryan eventually remarried and had a son. Ryan is an avid cyclist.

== Bands ==
- Trenches – vocals (2007–2010, 2012–2023)
- Haste the Day - vocals (2002-2005, 2014-2016, 2023)
- Upheaval – vocals (1997–1999)
- Anapparatus – vocals (2005–2006)

Timeline

== Discography ==
Upheaval

- Downfall of the Ascendancy of Man (1997)

Haste the Day

- That They May Know You (2002)
- Burning Bridges (2004)
- When Everything Falls (2005)
- Coward (2015)

Trenches

- The Tide Will Swallow Us Whole (2008)
- Reckoner (2022)

Guest appearances

- "The Fallout, Part 2" by Voices
- "Beheaded" by Demon Hunter (Live in 2004)
- "Communion for Ravens" by Phinehas (2017)
