= Out of the Dust (band) =

- Origin: Nashville, Tennessee
- Genres: Worship; Christian pop
- Years active: 2014–present
- Labels: Discovery House
- Members: Chris Teague; Stephanie Teague
- Website: outofthedustmusic.com

Out of the Dust are an American Christian music husband-and-wife duo from Nashville, Tennessee, and Chris Teague and Stephanie Teague started making music together in 2014. They released two independently made extended plays, One Mic, One Night (2014) and Lead Me Through (2015). The duo released a studio album, Out of the Dust (2017), with Discovery House Music.

== Background ==
Out of the Dust are a husband-and-wife duo from Nashville, Tennessee. Christopher Sean Teague was born on December 16, 1985, while Stephanie Lee Teague (née, Beaird) was born on August 23, 1986. Both were born and raised in Murfreesboro, Tennessee. The couple were married, got divorced after Christopher lost his faith, and were later remarried after he regained his faith.

== Music history ==
Their first release together, an extended play, One Mic, One Night, was released on February 4, 2014. The second extended play, Lead Me Through, was released in 2015, via NoiseTrade. They released, Out of the Dust, on March 10, 2017, with Discovery House Music.

== Members ==
- Christopher Sean "Chris" Teague (born December 16, 1985)
- Stephanie Lee Teague (née, Beaird; born August 23, 1986)

== Discography ==
Albums

- Out of the Dust (March 10, 2017, Discovery House)
- Now More Than Ever (September 13, 2019)

EPs

- One Mic, One Night (2014)
- Lead Me Through (2015)
