= Spitfire (American band) =

American metalcore band

- Origin: Virginia Beach, Virginia, U.S.
- Genres: Metalcore, hardcore punk, progressive metal
- Years active: 1996–2002; 2005–present
- Labels: Solid State, Goodfellow
- Members: Matt Beck; Chris Raines; Jon Spencer; Dan Tulloh
- Past members: Jimmy Reeves; Scottie Henry; Ian Sabo; Randy Vanderbilt

Spitfire is an American metalcore band from Virginia Beach, Virginia. They first formed in the late 1990s and were previously signed to Goodfellow Records.

== History ==
Originally, the band featured vocalist and guitarist Matt Beck, drummer Chris Raines, and bassist Jimmy Reeves. With this lineup, they released an EP called Straining Towards What's To Come on 2Jake Records and The Dead Next Door on Solid State Records in 1999. For a brief time, Beck left the band and was replaced by Randy Vanderbilt (Scarlet) on guitar and Jon Spencer (ex-Scarlet) on vocals. With this new vocalist and guitarist, Spitfire released a second EP, called The Slideshow Whiplash, for Goodfellow Records. The band broke up in 2002.

In late 2005, Spitfire re-formed with new members. While the band had been broken up, Reeves had moved to New York City, leaving Beck and Raines as the only original members. Spencer was again their vocalist, and they added guitarist Scottie Henry from Norma Jean and bassist "Dangerous" Dan Tulloh, also formerly from Scarlet. They recorded a new album for Goodfellow Records, Self-Help, which was released on February 28, 2006. Ian Sabo then joined the band on bass, and Tulloh switched to guitar, giving the band three guitarists.

Spitfire announced the following statement on their Myspace page about their rumors of their breakup, and their new record, on June 24, 2007: "We have heard some rumors around scenesterville that we threw in the towel. Maybe we did, maybe we didn't. Maybe Matt left to become a Carni. Maybe you should go put the lotion in the basket. Regardless, we have been forced to cancel some shows due to a life laying the smackdown on a few of us. On the other hand, we are entering the studio after nearly a year of writing. Chris, Dan, Jon and Matt will be heading to Trax East on July 9 to begin recording "Cult Fiction". Prepare for your day to be ruined." Along with this statement, Henry and Sabo were no longer listed as part of their lineup.

Spitfire released their next album on April 29, 2008. Its name, Cult Fiction, is somewhat ironic; Spencer had released an album with his previous band called Cult Classic.

On January 2, 2008, "Crossed", which would be the first single from Cult Fiction, was released on their Myspace page.

On March 3, 2008, Spitfire announced that they would be releasing an iTunes exclusive release entitled "Black Leather" on March 25.

Currently Spitfire has again left their fans wondering about their status by posting this biography of the band: "Was born. Started cult. Fulfilled prophecy. Died with dignity."

The band released Self-Help on vinyl in 2015, through New American Records.

In 2016, Drummer Chris Raines did an interview, primarily talking about his musical career and Spitfire, and saying the band had just stopped. He said nothing about whether the band will restart.

== Members ==
Last known lineup

- Matt Beck - guitar (1996-1999, 2001–2002, 2005–present) vocals (1996-1999) (ex-Mae)
- Chris Raines - drums (1996-2002, 2005–present) (ex-Norma Jean, Sunndrug)
- Jon Spencer - vocals (1999-2002, 2005–present) (ex-Scarlet)
- Dan Tulloh - bass (2005–present) (ex-Scarlet)

Former members

- Jimmy Reeves - bass (Sunndrug) (1996-2002)
- Randy Vanderbilt - guitar (ex-Scarlet) (1999-2001)
- Scottie Henry - guitar (ex-Luti-Kriss, ex-Norma Jean) (2006-2007)
- Ian Sabo - bass (ex-DSGNS) (2006-2007) (Cultburner) (2023-present) (Poacher) (2026- present)

Timeline

== Discography ==
Studio albums

- Demo (1996)
- The Dead Next Door (1999, Solid State Records)
- Self-Help (2006, Goodfellow Records)
- Cult Fiction (2008, Goodfellow Records)

EPs

- Straining Towards What's to Come (1997 2Jake Records)
- The Slideshow Whiplash (2001, Goodfellow Records)
- Black Leather (2008, Goodfellow Records)
