= Phinehas (band) =

American metalcore band

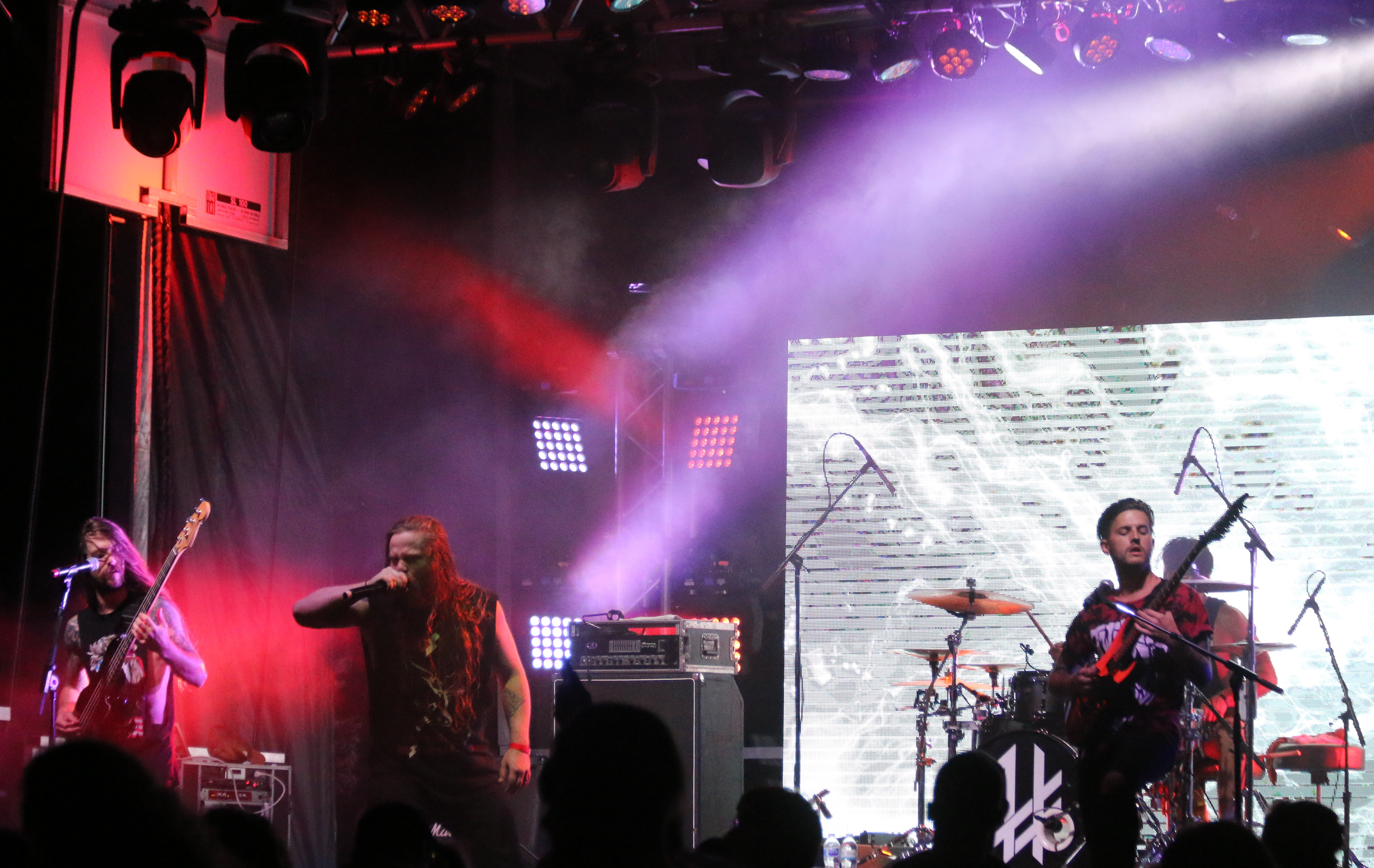
- Phinehas live at Lifest in 2018

Background information
- Origin: Los Angeles, California, U.S.
- Genres: Srscore; metalcore; Christian metal
- Years active: 2001–present
- Labels: Solid State; Artery; Red Cord
- Members: Sean McCulloch; Bryce Kelley; Daniel Gailey; Isaiah Perez
- Past members: Phil Killpatrick; Michael Angelo Ruffino; Michael Kevin Killpatrick; Matt Yriarte; Glenn Gizzi; Scott Whelan; Ryan Estrada; Dustin Saunders; Jason Combs; Lee Humerian
- Website: phinehasband.com

Phinehas is an American metalcore band formed in Los Angeles, California, in 2001. The group consists of vocalist Sean McCulloch, guitarist Daniel Gailey, bassist Bryce Kelley and drummer Isaiah Perez. They are currently signed to Solid State Records and have released five studio albums. Their most recent studio album, The Fire Itself, was released on August 27, 2021.

== History ==
=== Formation, line-up changes and Thegodmachine (2001–2012) ===
Phinehas formed in 2001 in Los Angeles, California. The band recorded and released a demo in 2005 with the line-up of Matt Yriarte (lead vocals), Glenn Gizzi (lead guitar, backing vocals), Michael Ruffino (rhythm guitar), Phil Killpatrick (bass), and Michael Killpatrick (drums). The band went through a few line-up changes following the demo's release before settling on Sean McCulloch (vocals), Scott Whelan (rhythm guitar), Ryan Estrada (bass) and Lee Humerian (drums) in addition to Gizzi. The band recorded and independently released a self-titled EP on December 15, 2009; Gizzi, the band's only remaining original member, left shortly after the EP's release and was replaced by Jason Combs. After the release, the band went on a 10-day tour before beginning work on their debut album Thegodmachine.

After finishing production of the album, the band looked at many labels, before being signed to Red Cord Records in 2011. Thegodmachine was released on September 30, 2011, through Red Cord, and received acclaim from music critics. Most of the praise came from the band's "uncompromising blast of metalcore" and the thrash metal-style riffs. The band toured extensively to promote the album, including a spot at the Cornerstone Festival in 2011, with bands such as P.O.D., For Today, Close Your Eyes and Living Sacrifice among others.

=== The Last Word Is Yours to Speak (2013–2014) ===
In early 2013, their second EP, The Bridge Between, was released featuring updated versions of songs from their self-titled EP and acoustic renditions of songs from Thegodmachine. Shortly after the release of The Bridge Between, Phinehas began work on their second studio album. On May 17, the first single, "Fleshkiller", was released along with the album's title, The Last Word Is Yours to Speak.

The band's second studio album, The Last Word Is Yours to Speak, was released on July 23, 2013, through Red Cord Records. The album proved to be successful as it gained the band their first charting positions on Billboard, charting on the Top Heatseekers chart and the Top Christian Albums chart. The album features guest vocals from Brennan Chaulk of the band Haste the Day. It has also a slight change in sound, with Sean McCulloch's vocals being more clean and less gruff. Also, the album features a strong influence from Southern rock, similar to their self-titled EP.

After the production of the release, Phinehas toured in support of the album. The band was featured on the "March Make a Mess Tour!" with headliner Close to Home. This tour included stops at South by Southwest and South by So What?!. Guitarist Jason Combs left the band in 2014, being replaced by Daniel Gailey of Becoming the Archetype.

=== Till the End (2014–2016) ===
At the end of 2014, Phinehas announced they would begin working on their third studio album after concluding their tour for The Last Word Is Yours to Speak. On February 17, 2015, the band announced they had signed to Artery Recordings after their previous label, Red Cord Records, dissolved into Victory Records. On May 4, Phinehas released the first single "Dead Choir" and announced that their third studio album, Till the End, would be released on July 10, 2015. On June 9, the band released the live music video for the song "Tetelestai". On July 13, three days after the album's release, the band unveiled a music video for the third single, "White Livered".

=== Dark Flag (2016–2019) ===
On December 16, 2016, the band released their third EP, titled Fight Through the Night featuring guest vocals from Garrett Russell of Silent Planet. On January 10, 2017, drummer Lee Humerian announced his departure from the band and performed his last show on January 21. Phinehas supported Erra on tour in the Spring of 2017. On September 13, the band signed to Solid State Records. On September 22, the band announced their fourth studio album titled Dark Flag would be released on November 17, 2017. Along with the announcement, they also released the album's title track.

Drums for the album were recorded by their former drummer, Lee Humerian, according to the band. On April 18, 2018, Phinehas announced that the session drummer of their past tour, Isaiah Perez, would be taking over the formerly vacant drums permanently. The band supported Within the Ruins in the Summer of 2018 alongside Great American Ghost and Sentinels while also supported As I Lay Dying on tour in the Spring of 2019. They then embarked on a small tour in the Summer of 2019.

=== The Fire Itself (2020–present) ===
On August 1, 2020, Phinehas announced that it had begun writing for its fifth studio album, expecting to release it in 2021. On March 27, 2021, the band posted a photo on its official Facebook page, announcing that production of the album had begun. On July 8, Phinehas released a brand new single "In the Night" and announced that their upcoming fifth studio album, The Fire Itself, is set for release on August 27, 2021. At the same time, the band revealed the album cover and the track list. On July 29, they debuted the second single "Eternally Apart". On August 20, one week before the album release, the band unveiled the third single and title track "The Fire Itself".

== Musical style ==
Phinehas have primarily been classified as srscore and metalcore, a mixture of hardcore punk and extreme metal. They have also been considered to incorporate elements of Christian metal and Southern rock into their style, and to be especially influenced by thrash metal.

== Members ==
Current

- Sean McCulloch – lead vocals (2007–present); additional guitar (2011–2012); drums (2017–2018)
- Bryce Kelley – bass, backing vocals (2012–present)
- Daniel Gailey – guitars, backing vocals (2014–present)
- Isaiah Perez – drums (2018–present; touring member 2017)

Former

- Phil Killpatrick – bass (2001–2005)
- Michael Angelo Ruffino – rhythm guitar (2001–2007)
- Michael Kevin Killpatrick – drums (2001–2007)
- Matt Yriarte – lead vocals (2003–2007)
- Glenn Gizzi – lead guitar, backing vocals (2001–2010)
- Scott Whelan – rhythm guitar, backing vocals (2006–2011)
- Ryan Estrada – bass (2006–2012)
- Dustin Saunders – rhythm guitar (2011–2012)
- Jason Combs – lead guitar (2010–2014); rhythm guitar (2012–2014)
- Lee Humerian – drums, backing vocals (2007–2017); additional guitar (2011–2012)

Session and touring musicians

- Chris Deets – drums (2013, 2014)

Timeline

== Discography ==
=== Studio albums ===
Year	Name	Label	Peak chart positions					
Year	Name	Label	US Heat	US Christ.	US Indie	Hard Rock	US Rock	Album Sales
2011	Thegodmachine	Red Cord	—	—	—	—	—	—
2013	The Last Word Is Yours to Speak	Red Cord	34	41	—	—	—	—
2015	Till the End	Artery	—	2	12	5	21	89
2017	Dark Flag	Solid State	—	11	18	20	—	—
2021	The Fire Itself	Solid State	—	11	—	—	—	—

=== Extended plays ===
Year	Name	Label
2005	Demo	Self-released
2009	Phinehas	Self-released
2013	The Bridge Between	Red Cord
2016	Fight Through the Night	Self-released

=== Singles ===
Year	Name	Album
2011	"I Am the Lion"	Thegodmachine
2012	"Crowns"	Thegodmachine
2012	"My Horses Are Many"	Thegodmachine
2012	"Enkindler"	The Bridge Between
2013	"Fleshkiller"	The Last Word Is Yours to Speak
2013	"O Come, O Come, Emmanuel"	Non-album single
2014	"Blood on My Knuckles"	The Last Word Is Yours to Speak
2015	"Dead Choir"	Till the End
2015	"Tetelestai"	Till the End
2015	"White Livered"	Till the End
2017	"Dark Flag"	Dark Flag
2017	"Know Death; Know Forever"	Dark Flag
2017	"Hell Below"	Dark Flag
2021	"In the Night"	The Fire Itself
2021	"Eternally Apart"	The Fire Itself
2021	"The Fire Itself"	The Fire Itself

=== Music videos ===
Year	Name	Director
2008	"Well If the Earths Are Stopped, Then the Fox Faces the Hounds"	Ricky Norris
2011	"I Am the Lion"	Josiah Bultima
2012	"Crowns"	John Mediana
2012	"My Horses Are Many"	Phinehas
2013	"Fleshkiller"	Ricky Norris
2014	"Blood on My Knuckles"	Ricky Norris
2015	"Tetelestai"	Ricky Norris
2015	"White Livered"	Shan Dan
2016	"Forever West"	Ricky Norris
2017	"Hell Below"	Phinehas
2017	"Burning Bright"	Phinehas
2021	"The Fire Itself"	Ricky Norris
