= That They May Know You =

EP by Haste the Day
- Released: 2002/2003
- Genre: Christian metal, metalcore
- Length: 31:21
- Label: Independent
- Producer: Haste the Day

Haste the Day chronology
That They May Know You (2002)	Burning Bridges (2004)

Professional ratings
Review scores
Source	Rating
New Release Tuesday	5/5 stars
Theprp	4/5 stars

That They May Know You is the debut EP and release of the Christian metal band, Haste the Day. It was the only release of the band that was Independently released.

== Critical reception ==
"I encourage you to listen to this C.D. You may have a different opinion about it. And I respect that. This E.P. is available at Amazon or on Haste the Day's Website (www.hastetheday.net). Writes Sputnik Music. Christcore writes "Haste the Day seems to have no fear in being as real as they can with their music. Whether it's heavy or soft they put their hearts into it 100%. That's something I really like about this band. I'm sure they have some label offers rolling in as you read this. I'm thinking maybe Solid State?" "Wookubus" of Theprp writes:"While most bands in this genre who attempt pairings of similar styles often come off as sappy emo/hardcore hybrids or unintelligible noisecore, Haste The Day instead use their grace and talent to concoct a unique balance that is nothing short of revitalizing, showing that there is still quite a bit of room for evolution in this spectrum of heavy music. Sure a few snags are hit along the way and not everything comes off as well as it was probably initially planned, but as it stands these Indiana natives have created one hell of an impressive outing and the fact that it's their only their first shows just how much room for improvement this group have; Suggesting that some even more seriously devastating output will come in the future."

== Track listing ==
No.	Title	Length
1.	"Many Waters"	3:46
2.	"Substance"	3:49
3.	"As Lambs"	3:32
4.	"Who We Are"	5:18
5.	"Epitaph"	4:38
6.	"The Dry Season"	4:53
7.	"Autumn"	5:26

== Personnel ==
- Jimmy Ryan - unclean vocals
- Brennan Chaulk - clean vocals, rhythm guitar
- Jason Barnes - lead guitar
- Mike Murphy - bass guitar, backing vocals
- Devin Chaulk - drums, percussion, backing vocals
