= The Ember Days =

New Zealand indie rock band

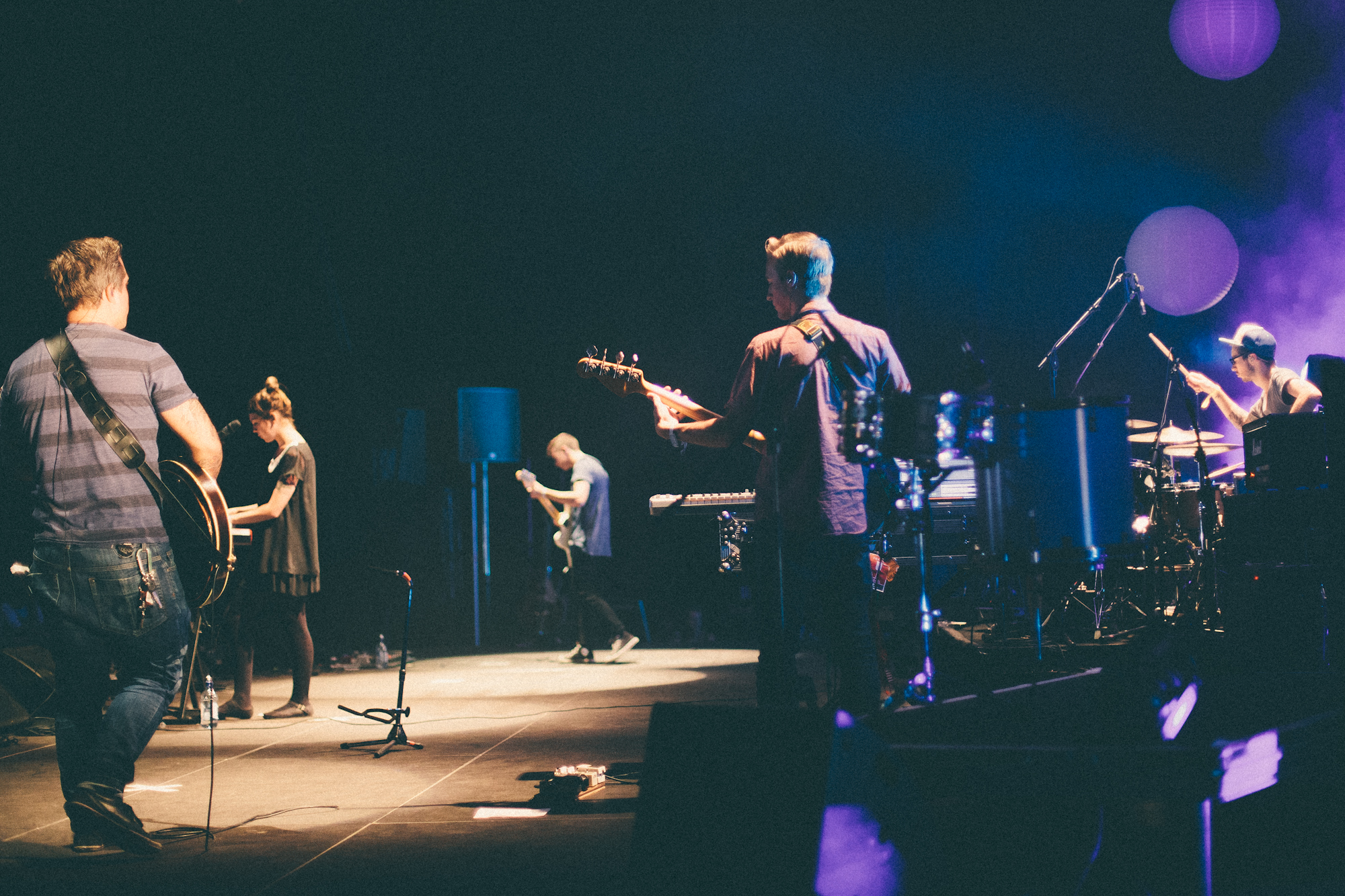
- The Ember Days playing in 2013

Background information
- Origin: Auckland, New Zealand
- Genres: Indie rock, alternative rock, worship, post-rock
- Years active: 2006–present
- Members: Janell Belcher; Jason Belcher; Jedidiah Lachmann; Logan Mackenzie; Jordan McGee
- Past members: Jordan Mackenzie; Matt Burrows; Tim Peters; Elliot Norton

The Ember Days is an indie rock band originally from New Zealand, now based in Nashville, Tennessee. They are currently not signed to any record label.

== Background ==
Formed in 2006, Jason and Janell Belcher began the band with a desire to create epic and accessible worship music, the current line-up consists of Jason (vocals and rhythm guitar), Janell (vocals and keys), Jordan McGee (drums), Logan MacKenzie (guitar) and Jedidiah Lachmann (bass).

They have released four studio albums, 2007's Your Eyes Light Up, 2011's Emergency, 2013's "More Than You Think", and 2015's "Valitus" as well as three EPs, 2008's self-titled The Ember Days EP, which came shortly after their move to America, 2010's Finger Painting EP, and 2014's The Ember Days Live. Valitus, was released in December 2015.

The Ember Days EP and Your Eyes Light Up both earned them New Zealand Music Award nominations for Best Christian Album.

In July 2012 the band launched a crowdfunding campaign through to finance a third studio album. The campaign succeeded in raising over $35,000 by 1 August 2012. The band began pre-production, and began recording in September 2012. Produced by Paul Moak and co-produced by Ed Cash, it features Zac Farro as a writer on the song "Face in the Dark" and drumming on some of the songs. The album, More Than You Think, was released at Parachute Music Festival in Hamilton, New Zealand on 25 January 2013 and became available to the general public on 29 January 2013. The album's title and songs were inspired when Janell was diagnosed with lupus before cancelling their Emergency album tour. The band wanted to show that there is "more than you think" going on in the lives of people around us.
