= The Fire Itself =

Studio album by Phinehas
- Released: August 27, 2021
- Recorded: March–June 2021
- Genres: Metalcore; deathcore; Christian metal
- Length: 41:36
- Label: Solid State
- Producers: Sean McCulloch; Daniel Gailey

Phinehas chronology
Dark Flag (2017)	The Fire Itself (2021)

Singles from The Fire Itself
- 1. "In the Night" Released: July 8, 2021; 2. "Eternally Apart" Released: July 29, 2021; 3. "The Fire Itself" Released: August 20, 2021

Professional ratings
Review scores
Source	Rating
Jesus Freak Hideout	4.5/5 stars
Metal1.info	7.5/10

The Fire Itself is the fifth studio album by American metalcore band Phinehas. The album was released on August 27, 2021, through Solid State Records. It was produced by Sean McCulloch and Daniel Gailey, the band's vocalist and guitarist. The album marks the longest gap between two albums from the band to date, spanning almost four years since Dark Flag.

== Background and promotion ==
On August 1, 2020, Phinehas announced that it had begun writing for the album, expecting to release it in 2021. On March 27, 2021, the band posted a photo on its official Facebook page, announcing that production of the album had begun. On July 8, Phinehas released a brand new single "In the Night" and announced the album itself. At the same time, the band revealed the album cover, the track list and release date. On July 29, they debuted the second single "Eternally Apart". On August 20, one week before the album release, the band unveiled the third single and title track "The Fire Itself".

== Track listing ==
All lyrics are written by Phinehas; all music is composed by Phinehas.

The Fire Itself track listing
No.	Title	Length
1.	"Eternally Apart"	5:04
2.	"The Fire Itself"	3:39
3.	"Thorns"	4:39
4.	"War You Know"	3:30
5.	"Defining Moments"	4:07
6.	"Holy Coward"	3:32
7.	"Dream Thief"	4:20
8.	"The Storm in Me"	4:33
9.	"Severed by Self-Betrayal"	3:29
10.	"In the Night"	4:43
Total length:		41:36

== Personnel ==
Credits adapted from Discogs.

Phinehas

- Sean McCulloch – lead vocals, production, engineering, artwork
- Daniel Gailey – guitars, backing vocals, production, engineering
- Bryce Kelley – bass, backing vocals
- Isaiah Perez – drums

Additional personnel

- Carson Slovak – mixing, mastering
- Grant McFarland – mixing, mastering
- Eric Powell – booking
- Adam Skatula – A&R
