= Scarlet (American band) =

American metalcore band

- Origin: Richmond, Virginia
- Genres: Metalcore, mathcore
- Years active: 1998-2003, 2004-2006, 2014 (On Hiatus)
- Labels: Ferret, Tribunal Records
- Members: Andreas Magnusson; Bryan Tolbert; Randy Vanderbilt
- Past members: Riley Emminger; Chris Hagen; Jon Spencer; Dan Tulloh; Brandon Roundtree

Scarlet is a metalcore band from Richmond, Virginia currently on a long term hiatus.

== History ==
Scarlet formed in Yorktown, Virginia in the late 1990s. In 2000, the band released its first EP Breaking the Dead Stare. Shortly afterward, Scarlet disbanded with Jon Spencer leaving to perform vocals for Virginia Beach-based metalcore band, Spitfire. Scarlet reformed in 2003 with Spencer returning on vocals. Scarlet released Something to Lust About on Ferret Music. The EP served as a teaser for Scarlet's first full-length album, Cult Classic. At its live shows prior to Cult Classic's release, Scarlet would perform Something to Lust About straight through. Cult Classic was released in March 2004 on Ferret Music. After Cult Classic's release, Spencer again left Scarlet to perform vocals for Spitfire. While recording local Richmond band, Forever in a Day (FIAD)'s 2005 Demo, Andres Magnusson recruited FIAD's singer to perform vocals for Scarlet. In mid 2005, Scarlet was reformed with Brandon Roundtree performing vocals. Scarlet released its second full-length album, This Was Always Meant To Fall Apart in January 2006. After completing a US tour in support of the record, Brandon Roundtree left Scarlet to form Conditions. Scarlet is on hiatus and are currently working on other projects. Andreas Magnusson engineers and produces music at his recording studio. Randy Vanderbilt continues to create music with his new band, These City Limits.

In August 2014, Scarlet released 2 new songs recorded in 2009 entitled "The Acid Reign I" and "The Acid Reign II".

== Members ==
Last Known Line-up

- Brandon Roundtree – vocals
- Andreas Magnusson – drums, electronics
- Randy Vanderbilt – guitar, vocals (Spitfire)
- Bryan Tolbert – guitar

Former members

- Jon Spencer – vocals (Spitfire)
- Scott Eckert – Guitar (Murder Weapon)
- Dan Tulloh – Guitar (Spitfire)
- Chris Hagen – Bass
- Drew Rosenblatt – Bass

Touring members

- Riley Emminger – Bass
- Brian Nichols – Bass

== Discography ==
Title	Release date	Label
Breaking the Dead Stare (EP)	2000	Tribunal Records
Something to Lust About (EP)	2003	Ferret Music
Cult Classic	2004	Ferret Music
This Was Always Meant to Fall Apart	2006	Ferret Music
