= Emmure discography =

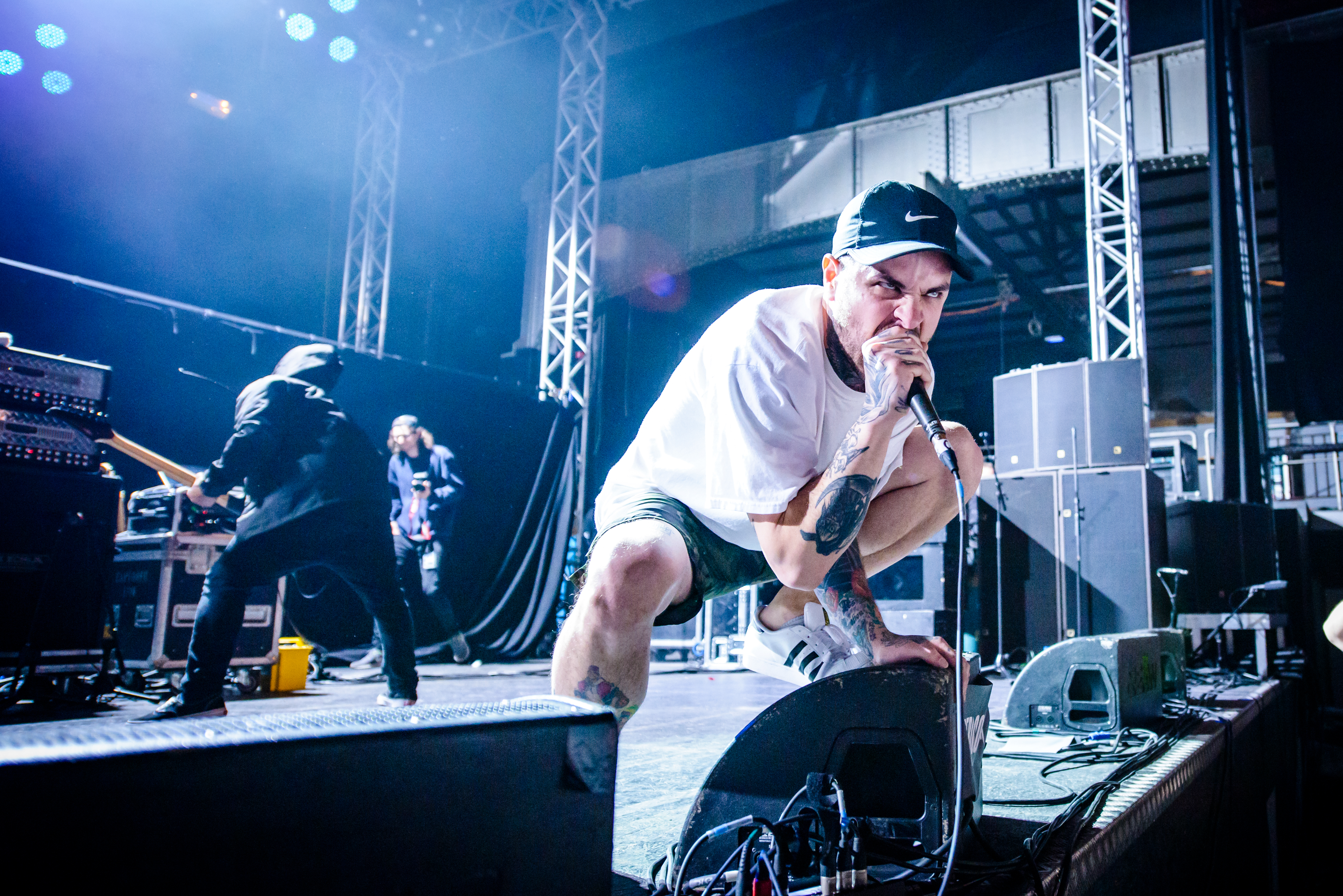
- Emmure performing in 2016
- Studio albums: 8
- EPs: 1
- Singles: 8
- Music videos: 9
- Demo albums: 3

Emmure is an American metalcore band. The group formed in 2003 in New Fairfield, Connecticut, but later moved to Queens, New York. The discography of Emmure consists of eight full-length albums, one EP and three demos.

== Studio albums ==
Name	Details	Peak chart position		
Name	Details	Top 200	US Indie	US Heat
Goodbye to the Gallows	Released: March 6, 2007; Label: Victory; Format: CD, music download	-	33	15
The Respect Issue	Released: May 13, 2008; Label: Victory; Format: CD, music download	141	17	4
Felony	Released: August 18, 2009; Label: Victory; Format: CD, music download	60	8	-
Speaker of the Dead	Released: February 15, 2011; Label: Victory; Format: CD, music download	68	11	-
Slave to the Game	Released: April 10, 2012; Label: Victory; Format: CD, music download	58	11	-
Eternal Enemies	Released: April 15, 2014; Label: Victory; Format: CD, music download	57	11	-
Look at Yourself	Released: March 3, 2017; Label: SharpTone; Format: CD, music download, vinyl	73	4	-
Hindsight	Released: June 26, 2020; Label: SharpTone; Format: CD, music download, vinyl	-	-	-

== EPs ==
Name	Details
The Complete Guide to Needlework	Released: 2006; Label: This City Is Burning; Format: CD, music download

== Demos ==
=== Surrounded By Nothing ===
- Released: 2004
- Label: Dead People Ink Records
- Format: CDr, Promo
- Information: The band's first ever demo. Many of the songs would later get re-recorded under new titles for some of the band's later releases, such as the band's Nine Eleven Zero Four demo and their EP The Complete Guide to Needlework.

Track list:

1. Symbols of Destruction
2. One Mind
3. Crystal Heart
4. Angels Cry Forever
5. Never Fade
6. Dying Dream
7. Erasing Tomorrow
8. Burning Bridges
9. Bitter Sweet
10. Nothing But Me

=== Nine Eleven Zero Four ===
- Released: 2004
- Label: Self-released
- Format: CD-R
- Information: was released/sold in a slimline CD case with an image of a deceased cupid as the cover art. The name of the demo is a tribute to the Lionel brother's friend who died on the date September 11, 2004. Guitarist Jesse Ketive engineered/produced all three songs.

Track list:

1. If God Only Knew
2. Green Is the Worst Color Ever
3. Mr. Know It All But No One Asks Me the Right Questions

=== Untitled Demo 2005 ===
- Released: 2005
- Label: Self-released
- Format: CDr, Promo
- Information: Demo recorded at GRS Studios in New York City. All 3 tracks are early demo versions of songs that would later get re-recorded for The Complete Guide to Needlework. The track titled "Untitled" would later acquire the name "22 Exits Away" for the EP.

Track list:

1. I Should Have Called Mrs. Cleo
2. Untitled
3. Johnny Carson Didn't Have To Die

== Singles ==
Title	Year	Album
"10 Signs You Should Leave"	2007	Goodbye to the Gallows
"False Love in Real Life"	2008	The Respect Issue
"I Thought You Met Telly and Turned Me into Casper"	2009	Felony
"Drug Dealer Friend"	2011	Speaker of the Dead
"Solar Flare Homicide"	2011	Speaker of the Dead
"I Am Onslaught"	2012	Slave to the Game
"Protoman"	2012	Slave to the Game
"MDMA"	2012	Slave to the Game
"Nemesis"	2014	Eternal Enemies
"Torch"	2016	Look at Yourself
"Russian Hotel Aftermath"	2016	Look at Yourself
"Flag of the Beast"	2017	Look at Yourself
"Pigs Ear"	2019	Hindsight
"Thunder Mouth"	2020	Hindsight
"Gypsy Disco"	2020	Hindsight
"Sons of Medusa"	2021	Non-album single

== Music videos ==
Song	Year	Album	Director	Type	Link
"10 Signs You Should Leave"	2007	Goodbye to the Gallows	Frankie Nasso	Narrative/Performance	
"Sound Wave Superior"	2008	The Respect Issue	Frankie Nasso		
"False Love In Real Life"	2009	The Respect Issue	Frankie Nasso	Performance	
"I Thought You Met Telly and Turned Me into Casper"	2009	Felony	Benjamin Eck	Performance	
"Drug Dealer Friend"	2011	Speaker of the Dead	Carlo Oppermann	Live/Montage	
"Solar Flare Homicide"	2011	Speaker of the Dead	Frankie Nasso	Performance	
"Children of Cybertron"	2011	Speaker of the Dead			
"MDMA"	2012	Slave To The Game	Frankie Palmeri	Narrative	
"I Am Onslaught"	2012	Slave To The Game			
"Protoman"	2012	Slave To The Game			
"Nemesis"	2014	Eternal Enemies	Frankie Palmeri		
"Like LaMotta"	2014	Eternal Enemies			
"E"	2014	Eternal Enemies			
"A Gift a Curse"	2014	Eternal Enemies	Jensen Noen		
"Flag of the Beast"	2017	Look at Yourself		Narrative/Performance	
"Smokey"	2017	Look at Yourself		Performance	
"Ice Man Confessions"	2018	Look at Yourself			
"Natural Born Killer"	2018	Look at Yourself		Live/Montage	
"Thunder Mouth"	2020	Hindsight	Frankie Nasso	Animated	

== Collaborations ==
Year	Song	Album	Artist
2009	"The Forgotten" (feat. Frankie Palmeri)	It's Nothing Personal	Bury Your Dead
2010	"Smileys Cousin" (feat. Frankie Palmeri)	The Science Of Exploitation	Doomsday Morning
2011	"Eyes Wide Open" (feat. Frankie Palmeri)	Kingdom Days in an Evil Age	Sleeping Giant
2012	"Epidemia" (feat. Frankie Palmeri)	Epidemia	Ill Niño
2012	"Solitary" (feat. Frankie Palmeri)	Redemption	Shinto Katana
2012	"Octobortion" (feat. Frankie Palmeri)	Nematocera	Defiler
2013	"Can We Start Again? (Bane Cover)" (feat. Frankie Palmeri & Mattie Montgomery)	Renegades Forever	I See Stars
2013	"Welcome Home" (feat. Frankie Palmeri)	A Thousand Voices EP	Witness for Hope
2013	"F.R.E.A.K.S." (feat. Frankie Palmeri & Aaron Matts)	Will, Love, Life	As They Burn
2013	"Ivory's Ashes" (feat. Frankie Palmeri)	Deadbeat EP	Sylar
2015	"Loose Cannon" (feat. Frankie Palmeri)	Shitlife	Gift Giver'
2018	"Cetra" (feat. Frankie Palmeri)	Single	Shark Infested Daughters
2018	"Snake in the Grass" (feat. Frankie Palmeri)	Insurrectionist EP	Dead/Awake
2018	"Callout 3" (feat. Frankie Palmeri)	Single	Ev0lution
2018	"Lot 242" (feat. Frankie Palmeri)	Blur EP	Broken Youth
2019	"Switched On" (feat. Frankie Palmeri)	Single	Misery Crew
2019	"Crown of Creation" (feat. Frankie Palmeri)	Plaguebearer	Call of Charon
2019	"The Skin We Live In" (feat. Frankie Palmeri)	Desolate	Absence of Despair
2020	"Decepticon" (feat. Frankie Palmeri)	Single	TERRORBYTE
