= Bury Your Dead (disambiguation) =

Bury Your Dead is an American metalcore band.

Bury Your Dead may also refer to:

- Bury Your Dead (album), their 2008 album
- "Bury Your Dead" (NCIS), an episode of the television series NCIS
- Bury Your Dead (novel), a 2010 crime novel by Louise Penny
- "Bury Your Dead", a song by The Haunted from their album Made Me Do It
