= You Had Me at Hello =

You Had Me at Hello may refer to:

- A line from the 1996 film Jerry Maguire
- You Had Me at Hello (album), an album by Bury Your Dead
- "You Had Me at Hello", a song by A Day to Remember from And Their Name Was Treason
- "Had Me @ Hello", a song from the 2012 movie Girl vs. Monster
- You Had Me at Hello (EP), an EP by South Korean boy group Zerobaseone

== See also ==
- "Hello", a song by Beyoncé from I Am... Sasha Fierce, which repeats the phrase "You Had Me at Hello" throughout its refrain
- "You Had Me at Goodbye", an episode of Dawson's Creek
