= Mosh n' Roll =

Studio album by Bury Your Dead
- Released: August 2, 2011
- Recorded: The Brick Hithouse
- Genre: Metalcore, beatdown hardcore
- Length: 30:32
- Label: Mediaskare
- Producer: Shane Frisby

Bury Your Dead chronology
It's Nothing Personal (2009)	Mosh n' Roll (2011)

Professional ratings
Review scores
Source	Rating
Revolver	3.5/5 stars
Under The Gun Review	8/10
AllMusic	4/5 stars

Mosh n' Roll is the sixth and final studio album from metalcore band Bury Your Dead, released on August 2, 2011, by Mediaskare Records. The album marks the return of the band's former vocalist, Mat Bruso.

Mosh n' Roll contains 11 audio tracks, although the final track, "Mosh n' Roll" is not listed on the back cover or in the liner notes. The song was originally recorded and featured on the band's first official album, You Had Me At Hello (2002). The version that appears on Mosh n' Roll (the 2011 album) is a re-recorded version of the original. The re-recorded track and the album's title pay homage to Bury Your Dead's roots.

With the exception of the title track, all songs on the album are named after Kurt Vonnegut works. Previous Bury Your Dead albums also had themes: Cover Your Tracks (2004) has tracks named after movies featuring Tom Cruise, in Beauty and the Breakdown the theme was children's fairy-tales, expressed through track titles, artwork and song lyrics.

The album was recorded in Hyannis, MA at The Brick HitHouse studios and produced by Shane Frisby.

Mosh n' Roll was released on August 2, 2011, through Mediaskare Records.

== Track listing ==
No.	Title	Length
1.	"Slaughterhouse-Five"	2:32
2.	"Nothing Is Lost Save Honor"	2:39
3.	"Bluebeard"	2:39
4.	"The Sirens of Titan"	3:26
5.	"Deadeye Dick"	2:19
6.	"Timequake"	2:51
7.	"Sun Moon Star"	2:34
8.	"Slapstick"	2:49
9.	"Mother Night"	2:57
10.	"Jailbird"	3:39
11.	"Mosh n' Roll"	2:05
Total length:		30:32

== Credits ==
- Mat Bruso - vocals
- Brendan MacDonald - guitars, bass
- Mark Castillo - drums
