= Speaker of the Dead =

Studio album by Emmure
- Released: February 15, 2011
- Studios: The Foundation Recording Studios, Connersville, Indiana
- Genres: Nu metal, metalcore, deathcore
- Length: 38:14
- Label: Victory
- Producer: Joey Sturgis

Emmure chronology
Felony (2009)	Speaker of the Dead (2011)	Slave to the Game (2012)

Singles from Speaker of the Dead
- 1. "Drug Dealer Friend" Released: February 3, 2011; 2. "Solar Flare Homicide" Released: February 9, 2011

Speaker of the Dead is the fourth studio album by metalcore/nu metal band Emmure released on February 15, 2011. The record was produced by Joey Sturgis, who also produced the following full-length. Speaker of the Dead is Emmure's fourth studio release under Victory Records, completing Victory's four-album deal at the time. However, Emmure re-signed with Victory and released two later albums, Slave to the Game on April 10, 2012, and Eternal Enemies on April 15, 2014.

== Background ==
On January 7, 2011, Victory Records released a 41-second teaser on YouTube which displayed the album's official artwork, as well as giving a preview of "Children of Cybertron", the intro track off of the album. On January 18, 2011, the first single, "Demons with Ryu", was released on iTunes and Amazon MP3. On February 9, 2011, a music video was made and released for the song "Solar Flare Homicide". At the release, Speaker of the Dead debuted at No. 68 on the Billboard 200, No. 18 on the Rock Albums chart, No. 4 on the Hard Rock Albums chart, and No. 11 on the Independent Albums chart. All the drums on Speaker of the Dead were programmed.

== Reception ==
Professional ratings
Review scores
Source	Rating
Review Rinse Repeat	1/5 stars

Speaker of the Dead received mixed reviews from critics. Peter Gorgui of ReviewRinseRepeat.com wrote a negative review of the album calling Speaker of the Dead a "failure" and describing the album's content as "boring" and "desperate". Gorgui did, however, praise the production done on the album by Joey Sturgis, saying Sturgis gave the album "a crunchy and crisp sound."

== Track listing ==
No.	Title	Length
1.	"Children of Cybertron"	1:33
2.	"Area 64-66"	2:33
3.	"Dogs Get Put Down"	3:03
4.	"Demons with Ryu"	3:02
5.	"Solar Flare Homicide"	3:50
6.	"Eulogy of Giants"	1:52
7.	"Bohemian Grove"	3:23
8.	"4 Poisons 3 Words"	2:56
9.	"Cries of Credo"	2:43
10.	"Last Words to Rose"	2:55
11.	"A Voice from Below"	1:58
12.	"Drug Dealer Friend"	2:37
13.	"My Name Is Thanos"	2:08
14.	"Lights Bring Salvation"	2:27
15.	"Word of Intulo"	1:14
Total length:		38:14

== Personnel ==
Emmure

- Frankie Palmeri - vocals
- Jesse Ketive - guitar
- Mike Mulholland - guitar
- Mark Davis - bass guitar
- Mike Kaabe - drums (credited but does not perform)

Production

- Produced, engineered, mixed, and mastered and programmed drums by Joey Sturgis
- Edited vocals by Nick Sampson
- Produced vocals by Taylor Voeltz
- Artwork and layout by We Are Synapse
- Layout by Doublej
