= It's Nothing Personal =

Studio album by Bury Your Dead
- Released: May 26, 2009
- Recorded: Early 2009 at The Brick HitHouse
- Genre: Metalcore; nu metal
- Length: 48:26
- Label: Victory
- Producer: Peter Rutcho

Bury Your Dead chronology
Bury Your Dead (2008)	It's Nothing Personal (2009)	Mosh n' Roll (2011)

Professional ratings
Review scores
Source	Rating
Allmusic	3.5/5 stars
AbsolutePunk.net	4/10 stars
Kill Your Stereo	(5.7/10)

It's Nothing Personal is the fifth studio album by American metalcore band Bury Your Dead. The album was released on May 26, 2009, through Victory Records. It was also the last album to be released on that label and to feature Myke Terry (Volumes) on vocals.

The album peaked at the Billboard 200 at number 142.

== Track listing ==
No.	Title	Length
1.	"Hurting Not Helping"	4:10
2.	"Without You"	4:38
3.	"Broken Body"	4:30
4.	"The Great Demonizer"	3:48
5.	"Dead End Lovesong"	4:42
6.	"Swan Song"	3:59
7.	"Lakota"	3:01
8.	"The Forgotten" (featuring Frankie Palmeri of Emmure)	4:21
9.	"Lion's Den"	4:28
10.	"Legacy of Ashes"	4:27
11.	"Closed Eyes"	4:50
12.	"Enough"	1:32
Total length:		48:26

== Personnel ==
- Myke Terry - vocals
- Brendan "Slim" MacDonald - guitar
- Chris Towning - guitar
- Aaron "Bubble" Patrick - bass guitar
- Mark Castillo - drums
