= Beauty and the Breakdown =

Studio album by Bury Your Dead
- Released: July 11, 2006
- Recorded: 2005–2006
- Genre: Metalcore; nu metal
- Length: 34:06
- Label: Victory
- Producer: Jason Suecof

Bury Your Dead chronology
Cover Your Tracks (2005)	Beauty and the Breakdown (2006)	Bury Your Dead (2008)

Professional ratings
Review scores
Source	Rating
AllMusic	4/5 stars
PopMatters	6/10 stars
Punknews	3.5/5 stars

Beauty and the Breakdown is the third studio album by metalcore band Bury Your Dead. The album was released on July 11, 2006, on Victory Records. The artwork is akin to a storybook and the song titles are from fairy tales.

Much like the group's second album, Cover Your Tracks, this album has a theme to its song titles. All songs titles are inspired by children's tales, similar to the songs on Cover Your Tracks, which are all Tom Cruise movie titles. The album is based on a woman and her abuser, as evidenced in the booklet that comes with the album.

The album sold 7,039 copies in its first week of release entering the Billboard 200 at number 129.

== Track listing ==
No.	Title	Fairy tale	Length
1.	"House of Straw"	Three Little Pigs	4:02
2.	"A Glass Slipper"	Cinderella	3:25
3.	"The Poison Apple"	Snow White	3:23
4.	"Twelfth Stroke of Midnight"	Cinderella	2:05
5.	"Trail of Crumbs"	Hansel and Gretel	2:41
6.	"A Wishing Well"	Snow White	3:27
7.	"Let Down Your Hair"	Rapunzel	3:13
8.	"Mirror, Mirror..."	Snow White	3:49
9.	"Second Star to the Right"	Peter Pan	2:38
10.	"The Enchanted Rose"	Beauty and the Beast	0:55
11.	"House of Brick"	Three Little Pigs	4:23
Total length:			34:06

== Personnel ==
Bury Your Dead

- Mat Bruso - vocals
- Brendan "Slim" MacDonald - guitar
- Eric Ellis - guitar
- Mark Castillo - drums
- Aaron Patrick - bass

Production

- Jason Suecof - Producer, Engineer, Mixing
- Dave Quiggle - artwork
