= The Complete Guide to Needlework =

2006 EP by metalcore band Emmure

EP by Emmure
- Released: 2006
- Recorded: 2006
- Studio: Wild Studios, Saint-Zénon, Quebec, Canada
- Genre: Deathcore, metalcore
- Length: 19:28
- Label: This City Is Burning Records, Uprising
- Producer: Antoine Lussier

Emmure chronology
Demo 2005 (2005)	The Complete Guide to Needlework (2006)	Goodbye to the Gallows (2007)

Independent version
- Cover for the self-released version.

The Complete Guide to Needlework is the first release by metalcore band Emmure, released in 2006 through This City Is Burning Records and later re-released on September 4, 2007, through Uprising Records. Needlework was produced by Antoine Lussier of Canadian metalcore group Ion Dissonance.

Aside from the versions released through This City Is Burning and Uprising, the EP was also distributed independently with different artwork.

== Track listing ==
No.	Title	Length
1.	"Second Hand Smoke"	0:52
2.	"Johnny Carson Didn't Have to Die"	2:31
3.	"Looking a Gift Horse in the Mouth"	3:50
4.	"I Should Have Called Ms. Cleo"	4:54
5.	"22 Exits Away"	4:23
6.	"A Fist Fight with Dick Tracy"	2:58
Total length:		19:28

== Personnel ==
Emmure

- Frankie Palmeri - vocals
- Jesse Ketive - guitar
- Ben Lionetti - guitar
- Mark Davis - bass guitar
- Joe Lionetti - drums

Production

- Produced, engineered and mixed by Antoine Lussier
- Mastered by Alan Douches
