= Look at Yourself (Emmure album) =

Studio album by Emmure
- Released: March 3, 2017
- Recorded: 2016
- Genre: Nu metalcore, djent
- Length: 31:27
- Label: SharpTone
- Producer: WZRD BLD

Emmure chronology
Eternal Enemies (2014)	Look at Yourself (2017)	Hindsight (2020)

Professional ratings
Review scores
Source	Rating
AllMusic	3.5/5 stars
Distorted Sound	5/10
Metal Hammer	3.5/5 stars

Look at Yourself is the seventh studio album by American metalcore band Emmure. It was released on March 3, 2017, through SharpTone Records. Produced by Andrew "WZRD BLD" Fulk, it features the band's new line-up with guitarist Josh Travis, bassist Phil Lockett and drummer Josh Miller.

In October 2016, Emmure released "Torch", the first single from the album, with "Russian Hotel Aftermath" following two months later.

Following the release of the album, some versions no longer feature the audio sample at the beginning of the track "Flag of the Beast" due to the band being unable to get clearance and permission to use it, as the band confirmed themselves via a comment on the track-by-track video of the song.

The album peaked at number 59 in Germany, number 61 in Austria, number 66 in Switzerland, number 73 on the US Billboard 200, number 18 on the UK Rock & Metal Albums and number 35 on the UK Independent Albums charts.

== Track listing ==
All lyrics are written by Frankie Palmeri, except track 5 written with Andrew Fulk; all music is composed by Frankie Palmeri and Joshua Travis, except track 5 written with Andrew Fulk.

No.	Title	Length
1.	"You Asked for It"	1:33
2.	"Shinjuku Masterlord"	3:08
3.	"Smokey"	2:01
4.	"Natural Born Killer"	2:37
5.	"Flag of the Beast"	3:23
6.	"Ice Man Confessions"	2:12
7.	"Russian Hotel Aftermath"	3:00
8.	"Call Me Ninib"	2:11
9.	"Major Key Alert"	1:20
10.	"Turtle in a Hare"	2:25
11.	"Torch"	2:32
12.	"Derelict"	1:10
13.	"Gucci Prison"	3:55
Total length:		31:27

== Personnel ==
- Frankie Palmeri — lyrics, vocals
- Joshua Travis — guitars
- Phil Lockett — bass
- Josh Miller — drums
- Drew Fulk — lyrics (track 5), producer, engineering, mixing
- Michael Kalajian — mastering
- Shawn Keith — A&R

== Charts ==
Chart (2017)	Peak position
Austrian Albums (Ö3 Austria)	61
German Albums (Offizielle Top 100)	59
Swiss Albums (Schweizer Hitparade)	66
UK Rock & Metal Albums (OCC)	18
UK Independent Albums (OCC)	35
US Billboard 200	73
