= You Had Me at Hello (album) =

- 2005 Eulogy reissue cover

Studio album by Bury Your Dead
- Released: 2002/2003
- Genre: Hardcore punk, metalcore
- Length: 33:20
- Label: Alveran; Eulogy (2005)

Bury Your Dead chronology
You Had Me at Hello (2002)	Cover Your Tracks (2004)

Professional ratings
Review scores
Source	Rating
Rock Hard	6/10 stars

You Had Me at Hello is the debut full-length album released by the metalcore band Bury Your Dead. The title comes from a line of romantic dialogue in the movie Jerry Maguire. In 2005, the album was re-issued at Eulogy Recordings, with new album artwork, and labels the current band members on the disc.

== Track listing ==
No.	Title	Length
1.	"Sunday's Best"	2:51
2.	"Tuesday Night Fever"	2:39
3.	"Dragged Out and Shot"	1:37
4.	"So Fucking Blues"	2:19
5.	"Burn Baby Burn"	1:57
6.	"33 RPM"	2:37
7.	"Cammo Is My Favorite Color"	2:06
8.	"69 Times a Charm"	2:08
9.	"Ten Minute Romance"	3:03
10.	"Mosh n' Roll" (Hidden Track starts at 10:54)	12:02
Total length:		33:20

"Mosh n' Roll", "Tuesday Night Fever", and "So Fucking Blues" were re-recorded as "Losin' It", "Mission: Impossible", and "Mission: Impossible 2" for the band's 2004 follow-up Cover Your Tracks. "Mosh n' Roll" was also re-recorded for the album of the same name as a hidden track.

== Personnel ==
- Joe Krewko - vocals
- Brendan "Slim" MacDonald - guitar
- Dan O'Connor - guitar
- Steve Kent - bass
- Mark Castillo - drums
