= Cover Your Tracks (album) =

Studio album by Bury Your Dead
- Released: October 19, 2004
- Recorded: 2004
- Genre: Hardcore punk, metalcore
- Length: 31:07
- Label: Victory
- Producer: Matthew Ellard

Bury Your Dead chronology
You Had Me at Hello (2003)	Cover Your Tracks (2004)	Beauty and the Breakdown (2005)

Professional ratings
Review scores
Source	Rating
Allmusic	2.5/5 stars
Punknews	2.5/5 stars

Cover Your Tracks is the second full-length album from the metalcore band Bury Your Dead. It was released October 19, 2004, on Victory Records and features re-recordings of two songs from Bury Your Dead's first full-length You Had Me at Hello. All songs are named after Tom Cruise movies.

== Track listing ==
No.	Title	Length
1.	"Top Gun"	2:19
2.	"Vanilla Sky"	2:23
3.	"Mission: Impossible"	2:42
4.	"Eyes Wide Shut"	2:33
5.	"Magnolia"	2:47
6.	"The Outsiders"	2:15
7.	"Mission: Impossible 2"	2:32
8.	"The Color of Money"	2:35
9.	"Risky Business"	4:25
10.	"Legend"	2:22
11.	"All the Right Moves"	3:00
12.	"Losin' It"	1:14
Total length:		31:07

- Music videos were released for "Magnolia" and "The Color of Money".

== Credits ==
=== Band ===
- Mat Bruso - vocals
- Brendan "Slim" MacDonald - guitars
- Eric Ellis - guitars
- Rich Casey - bass
- Mark Castillo - drums

=== Other ===
- Matthew Ellard - production, mixing
- Alan Douches - mastering
- Adam Wentworth - layout, design
- Robert Lotzko - photography
- Chris Daniele - model
- Krista Kovacs - model
- Elisha Kovacs - model
- Mark and Liz Copec - cars
- John Domminello - tuxedos
