= Hindsight (Emmure album) =

Studio album by Emmure
- Released: June 26, 2020
- Recorded: 2019
- Genre: Nu metal; metalcore; djent
- Length: 31:12
- Label: SharpTone
- Producer: Drew Fulk

Emmure chronology
Look at Yourself (2017)	Hindsight (2020)

Singles from Hindsight
- 1. "Pigs Ear" Released: October 31, 2019; 2. "Gypsy Disco" Released: March 13, 2020; 3. "Uncontrollable Descent" Released: May 9, 2020; 4. "Thunder Mouth" Released: July 24, 2020

Hindsight is the eighth studio album by American metalcore band Emmure. The work was released on June 26, 2020 by SharpTone Records.

It is the band's only studio album with bassist Nicolas Pyatt, and their last album with drummer Josh Miller (who would eventually go on to join Spite in 2021, before leaving that band in 2023 to focus on his internet project Darko US).

== Background ==
Vocalist Frankie Palmeri confirmed in August 2019 that the ensemble had entered the studio to record their eighth album. On 31 October 2019, the group released "Pigs Ear", the first single from the album, and tweeted "HINDSIGHT IS 2020". In March 2020, they published "Gypsy Disco", the second single from the work. They again posted "HINDSIGHT IS 2020" on Twitter.

On the one year anniversary of Hindsight's release (June 26, 2021), the band premiered "Sons Of Medusa" an unused track from the Hindsight recording sessions initially slated to be the opener of the album.

== Track listing ==
No.	Title	Length
1.	"(F)inally (U)nderstanding (N)othing"	2:52
2.	"Trash Folder"	2:03
3.	"Pigs Ear"	2:11
4.	"Gypsy Disco"	2:01
5.	"I've Scene God"	2:11
6.	"Persona Non Grata"	2:11
7.	"Thunder Mouth"	2:54
8.	"Pan's Dream"	3:12
9.	"203"	3:37
10.	"Informal Butterflies"	1:58
11.	"Action 52"	1:42
12.	"Bastard Ritual"	1:17
13.	"Uncontrollable Descent"	3:03
Total length:		31:12
