= Bury Your Dead (album) =

Studio album by Bury Your Dead
- Released: March 18, 2008
- Recorded: Audiohammer Studios, Sanford, Florida; November through December 2007
- Genre: Metalcore, hardcore punk
- Length: 33:13
- Label: Victory
- Producer: Jason Suecof

Bury Your Dead chronology
Beauty and the Breakdown (2006)	Bury Your Dead (2008)	It's Nothing Personal (2009)

Professional ratings
Review scores
Source	Rating
AllMusic	4/5 stars
Rockmidgets.com	5/5 stars
Lambgoat	3/10 stars

Bury Your Dead is the fourth studio album by American metalcore band Bury Your Dead. It is the first record made after the departure of vocalist Mat Bruso and is also the first full-length album not to have all of the song titles follow a common theme. The album shares its title with the band's first EP they released, which was also self-titled.

The album sold 4,700 copies in its first week of release entering the Billboard 200 at number 176.

Guitarist Mark Tremonti (from Alter Bridge and Creed) appears on the record, performing the guitar solo on the song "Year One".

== Track listing ==
No.	Title	Length
1.	"Sympathy Orchestra"	2:58
2.	"Hands to Hide the Shame"	2:41
3.	"Fever Dream"	3:16
4.	"Womb Disease"	2:42
5.	"Infidel's Hymn"	3:35
6.	"Year One" (featuring Mark Tremonti of Alter Bridge and Creed)	3:34
7.	"Angel with a Dirty Face"	3:19
8.	"Disposably Yours"	2:23
9.	"A Devil's Ransom"	2:32
10.	"Fool's Gold"	3:00
11.	"Dust to Dust"	3:19
Total length:		33:13

== Band members ==
- Myke Terry – vocals
- Brendan MacDonald – guitar
- Eric Ellis – guitar
- Aaron Patrick – bass guitar
- Mark Castillo – drums

== Personnel ==
- Music and Lyrics – Bury Your Dead
- Recorded at – Audiohammer Studios (November through December 2007)
- Produced and mixed – Jason Suecof and Bury Your Dead
- Mark Tremonti appears courtesy of Universal Republic Records, A Division of UMG Recordings, Inc.
- Layout design – Keith Barney
- Photography – Karen Jerzyk Photography
