= Slave to the Game =

Studio album by Emmure
- Released: April 10, 2012
- Recorded: January–February 2012
- Studio: The Foundation Recording Studios, Connersville, Indiana
- Genre: Deathcore, metalcore
- Length: 31:52
- Label: Victory
- Producer: Joey Sturgis

Emmure chronology
Speaker of the Dead (2011)	Slave to the Game (2012)	Eternal Enemies (2014)

Singles from Slave to the Game
- 1. "I Am Onslaught" Released: March 13, 2012; 2. "Protoman" Released: March 26, 2012; 3. "MDMA" Released: July 9, 2012

Professional ratings
Aggregate scores
Source	Rating
Metacritic	59/100
Review scores
Source	Rating
About.com	3/5 stars
Allmusic	3/5 stars

Slave to the Game is the fifth studio album by American metalcore band Emmure, released on April 10, 2012, through Victory Records. The record was produced by Joey Sturgis, who also did production on the band's previous album Speaker of the Dead. It is the first album to feature drummer Mark Castillo, following the band parting ways with their former drummer Mike Kaabe in October 2011.

Slave to the Game is the band's highest charting album to date, peaking number 58 on the Billboard 200, and number 11 on the Top Independent chart. Despite its success, the album is frontman Frankie Palmeri's least favorite out of the band's work. In 2015 interview, Palmeri considered the album to be a "commercial failure" and said "The songs suck. It's just not good. None of the riffs are good. I just don't like it. I feel bad 'cause I let that record happen."

== Background and promotion ==
It was announced on November 19, 2011 that Emmure would be heading into the studio with producer Joey Sturgis to record the album in January 2012. Following this announcement, in January 2012, guitarist Jesse Ketive announced on his Facebook that the band had entered the studio and that they had employed drummer Mark Castillo to track drums on the album. Castillo later announced that his position in Emmure would be permanent. On January 20, 2012, Emmure announced through Victory Records that their new album would be named Slave to the Game.

On February 14, 2012, Victory Records released a teaser video promoting the album, revealing the album's cover art. In an interview with Alternative Press in promotion of the album, vocalist Frankie Palmeri said "It's just a heavy fucking record. It's another Emmure record that hopefully people get to enjoy with us, because we dig it and that's what it comes down to. We just make albums we try to enjoy and hopefully people can come along for the ride."

On March 7, 2012, the first single from Slave to the Game, titled "Protoman", was released through the band's Vevo account. The band would later announce that "Protoman", as well as a second single entitled "I Am Onslaught", would be available as digital singles on both iTunes and Amazon.com on March 13, 2012. On May 25, 2012, it was announced that Emmure was recording a video for their song "MDMA", thus making it the third single from Slave to the Game.

== Track listing ==
All lyrics are written by Frankie Palmeri and Jesse Ketive; all music is composed by Emmure.

No.	Title	Length
1.	"Insert Coin"	0:30
2.	"Protoman"	3:17
3.	"She Gave Her Heart to Deadpool"	2:46
4.	"I Am Onslaught"	3:00
5.	"Bison Diaries"	2:44
6.	"Poltergeist" (feat. Tommy Green of Sleeping Giant)	0:57
7.	"Cross Over Attack"	3:14
8.	"Umar Dumps Dormammu"	2:48
9.	"Blackheart Reigns"	2:59
10.	"MDMA"	3:26
11.	"War Begins with You"	2:53
12.	"A.I."	3:18
Total length:		31:52

=== Track title references ===
- Track two's title is a reference to Proto Man, a character in the Mega Man franchise.
- Track three is a reference to Deadpool, a Marvel anti-hero. It is sung from the perspective of Thanos.
- Track four is a reference to Marvel supervillain Onslaught.
- Track five is a reference to M. Bison - a Street Fighter character. The song's lyrics also make a reference to Vega, a Grand Master bodyguard for Bison's faction Shadaloo.
- Track six is a reference to the Marvel character Poltergeist, a mutant with the uncontrollable ability to cause unlikely events to occur.
- Track seven is a reference to an attack in Marvel vs. Capcom 3: Fate of Two Worlds.
- Track eight is a reference to Dormammu, a Marvel supervillain, as well as the character's sister, Umar.
- Track nine is a reference to Blackheart, who is a demon in Marvel comic books. The lyrics also make reference to Mephisto, Blackheart's creator.

== Personnel ==
Emmure

- Mark Castillo - drums
- Mark Davis - bass guitar
- Jesse Ketive - guitar
- Mike Mulholland - guitar
- Frankie Palmeri - vocals

Production

- Produced by Joey Sturgis, Ash Avildsen, Shawn Keith & Emmure
- Engineered by Joey Sturgis & Allan Hessler
- Mixed & mastered by Joey Sturgis
- Produced vocals by Ash Avildsen, Shawn Keith, Nick Walters & Frankie Palmeri
- Editing by Jeff Dunne
- Management by Shawn Keith
- Booking by Amanda Fiore (The Pantheon Agency) & Marco Walzel (Avocado Booking)
- Artwork by Daniel McBride
- Art direction by Double J & Frankie Palmeri
- Layout by Double J
- Photo by Double J, Eric Richter, Robert Scheuerman & Dustin Smith
