= Felony (album) =

Studio album by Emmure
- Released: August 18, 2009
- Recorded: 2009
- Studio: Wild Studios (in Quebec, Canada)
- Genre: Nu metal; metalcore
- Length: 31:37
- Label: Victory
- Producer: Antoine Lussier, Bryan Goldsman

Emmure chronology
The Respect Issue (2008)	Felony (2009)	Speaker of the Dead (2011)

Singles from Felony
- 1. "I Thought You Met Telly and Turned Me into Casper" Released: 2009; 2. "Bars in Astoria" Released: 2010

Professional ratings
Review scores
Source	Rating
Allmusic	3/5 stars
AbsolutePunk	19%
Way Too Loud!	2/5 stars

Felony is the third studio album by American metalcore group Emmure under the Victory Records label. It was released on August 18, 2009. The album debuted at #60 on the Billboard Top 200 selling roughly 8,000 copies in its first week. Felony is also the first album to feature new members Mike Mulholland on guitar and Mike Kaabe on drums, replacing founding members Ben and Joe Lionetti, respectively.

In 2021, Joe Smith-Engelhardt of Alternative Press included the album in his list of "30 deathcore albums from the 2000s that define the genre".

== Inspiration and musical style ==
=== Inspiration ===
The album is allegedly inspired by a real event in which vocalist Frankie Palmeri assaulted his best friend by "[hitting] him in the head with a bottle", which resulted in Palmeri being arrested. The lyrics for the album's title track also references this anecdote.

=== Style ===
Felony is the first album by Emmure to draw on more of a nu metal influence than their previous albums, evident the more-frequent bounce riffs and other tropes such as rapping vocals. AllMusic stated "...their streamlined brand of East Coast hardcore, death metal, and punk is as reliable as it is predictable." MetalSucks noted that the album features gangsta rap elements.

Several songs on the album reference popular culture media. Examples include the song title "I <3 EC2" (which is a reference to the film Planet Terror). The song "The Philosophy of Time Travel" is the title to a fictional book from the film, Donnie Darko; the guitar riffs played on the track are similar to the melody of the song from the film's score, much of the lyrics were inspired by the film as well.

The title of the second track, "I Thought You Met Telly and Turned Me Into Casper," is a reference to two characters from the 1995 film Kids; Telly (Leo Fitzpatrick) and his friend Casper (Justin Pierce).

The song "R2deepthroat" contains a verse of lyrics found in the 1995 hip hop song "Shook Ones (Part II)" by Mobb Deep, which was done as an homage to New York hip hop.

== Track listing ==
No.	Title	Length
1.	"Sunday Bacon"	2:37
2.	"I Thought You Met Telly and Turned Me into Casper"	2:53
3.	"I <3 EC2"	2:45
4.	"Felony"	2:47
5.	"You Sunk My Battleship"	3:09
6.	"The Philosophy of Time Travel"	2:36
7.	"First Impressions"	2:18
8.	"R2DEEPTHROAT"	2:17
9.	"Bars in Astoria"	3:28
10.	"A Lesson from Nichole"	2:26
11.	"Don't Be One"	2:55
12.	"Immaculate Misconception"	1:26
Total length:		31:37

== Personnel ==
Emmure

- Frankie Palmeri - vocals
- Jesse Ketive - guitar
- Mike Mulholland - guitar
- Mark Davis - bass guitar
- Michael Kaabe - drums

Production

- Produced by Bryan Goldsman and Antoine Lussier
- Engineered by Yanick Desgroseilliers and Antoine Lussier
- Mixed by Antoine Lussier
- Mastered by Pierre Rémillard
- Photography by Jeremy Saffer
