= Goodbye to the Gallows =

Studio album by Emmure
- Released: March 5, 2007
- Recorded: November 2006 – January 2007
- Genre: Deathcore; metalcore
- Length: 29:33
- Label: Victory
- Producer: Chris "Zeuss" Harris

Emmure chronology
The Complete Guide to Needlework (2006)	Goodbye to the Gallows (2007)	The Respect Issue (2008)

Singles from Goodbye to the Gallows
- 1. "10 Signs You Should Leave" Released: February 20, 2007

Professional ratings
Review scores
Source	Rating
AllMusic	3.5/5 stars
PopMatters	3/10 stars
Punknews	1.5/5 stars
Thrash Pit	6/10 stars

Goodbye to the Gallows is the debut full-length studio album by Emmure, released through Victory Records in the UK on March 5, 2007, and in the US on March 6. A vinyl reissue of the album was also released by Victory in 2013.

== Track listing ==
No.	Title	Length
1.	"A Ticket for the Paralyzer"	0:50
2.	"10 Signs That You Should Leave"	3:19
3.	"When Keeping It Real Goes Wrong"	3:17
4.	"Rusted Over Wet Dreams"	3:09
5.	"You Got a Henna Tattoo That Said Forever"	3:24
6.	"Travis Bickle"	2:06
7.	"Sleeping Princess in Devil's Castle" (featuring Karl Schubach of Misery Signals and Tyler Guida of My Bitter End)	3:36
8.	"The Key to Keeping the Show Fresh Is... I'm Dead"	2:45
9.	"It's Not Just a Party, It's a Funeral!"	3:05
10.	"When Everything Goes Wrong, Take the Easy Way Out"	4:02
Total length:		29:33

== Song title information ==
- According to early album art, "Rusted Over Wet Dreams" was originally titled "Scorpios With Black Names Are Bad News".
- Track 6, titled "Travis Bickle" is a reference to the Martin Scorsese film Taxi Driver.
- Tracks 3 and 8 are derived from the comedy program Chappelle's Show, the former being a reference to the title of a recurring sketch, and the latter a recurring quote by a character in a sketch respectively.
- The title of Track 5, "You Got a Henna Tattoo that Said Forever" is a reference to a quote from Zach Galifianakis' 2001 episode of Comedy Central Presents.
- Track 7, "Sleeping Princess in Devil's Castle" is a take on the Dragon Ball film of the same name.

== Personnel ==
Emmure

- Frankie Palmeri - lead vocals
- Jesse Ketive - guitar
- Ben Lionetti - guitar
- Mark Davis - bass guitar
- Joe Lionetti - drums

Production

- Produced, engineered and mixed by Chris "Zeuss" Harris
- Mastered by Alan Douches
- Art direction, layout, band logo and illustrations by Paul Friemel
