= Mark Castillo =

American musician (born 1980)

- Born: October 10, 1980 (age 45); Philadelphia, Pennsylvania, U.S.
- Genres: Metalcore; deathcore; progressive metal; hard rock
- Occupation: Drummer
- Instruments: Drums, percussion
- Years active: 2001–present

Mark Edward Castillo (born October 10, 1980) is an American musician. He is a former drummer of the deathcore band Emmure, the hard rock band Crossfade and the progressive metal band Between the Buried and Me, and a founding member and current drummer of the American metalcore bands Bury Your Dead and Painless.

== Early life ==
Castillo attended North Shore Technical High School, Middleton, Massachusetts, where he majored in Health Assisting.

== Between the Buried and Me ==
Castillo played drums on the progressive metalcore band Between the Buried and Me's 2003 release The Silent Circus.

== Bury Your Dead ==
In 2001, Castillo and guitarist Brendan "Slim" MacDonald formed a side-project which would later evolve into Bury Your Dead. Throughout numerous line-up changes Castillo was ever-present in the band as they released five albums via Victory Records before Castillo departed amicably in December 2010 to join Crossfade. Castillo would return from 2011 to 2014 and returning again in 2016.

== Crossfade ==
Throughout 2010, Crossfade was actively seeking a drummer following the departure of James Branham in 2007, culminating in the band holding auditions in lead-singer Ed Sloan's garage. Castillo would make the long journey to West Columbia, South Carolina and successfully audition, becoming a full-time member of the line-up and going on to perform frequently alongside them throughout 2011. Their June 21, 2011 release We All Bleed was recorded in 2009/10 with Evanescence's Will Hunt performing drums and percussion on the album.

== Emmure ==
On January 8, 2012, Lambgoat revealed that Castillo had joined Emmure for the recording of their fifth full-length album, Slave to the Game. Later, Castillo confirmed that he would be leaving Crossfade to join Emmure full-time.

On July 2, 2014, it was announced that Castillo had departed the band, and All Shall Perish drummer Adam Pierce would replace him on the band's upcoming tours.
