= Eternal Enemies =

Studio album by Emmure
- Released: April 15, 2014
- Studio: Metro 37 Studios / The Foundation Recording Studios, Connersville, Indiana
- Genre: Nu metalcore; deathcore; nu metal
- Length: 44:47
- Label: Victory
- Producer: Joey Sturgis

Emmure chronology
Slave to the Game (2012)	Eternal Enemies (2014)	Look at Yourself (2017)

Singles from Eternal Enemies
- 1. "Nemesis" Released: March 3, 2014; 2. "Like LaMotta" Released: April 6, 2014; 3. "E" Released: June 9, 2014; 4. "A Gift a Curse" Released: January 18, 2015

Eternal Enemies is the sixth studio album from Emmure, released on April 15, 2014. It is the final album to feature drummer Mark Castillo after his departure less than 3 months after the album's release. It is also the final album to feature Jesse Ketive, Mark Davis, and Mike Mulholland after their departure on December 22, 2015.

== Background ==
When the track listing for the album was released on February 18, 2014, the name of the first track, "Bring a Gun to School", sparked controversy. This resulted in their former guitarist Ben Lionetti making a statement with respect to his former ensemble and commenting on the track, calling lead vocalist Frankie Palmeri a "disgusting human being". He reportedly considered filing legal action against Emmure, their record label and their management to retrieve the money that is due to him and his brother Joe, a former drummer of the band. The song title has been changed to simply "(Untitled)" in the iTunes store. The track was deemed the most "not safe for work" modern metal song by Louder Sound.

== Critical reception ==
Professional ratings
Review scores
Source	Rating
AllMusic	(unrated)
Alternative Press	4/5 stars
Sputnikmusic	1.5/5 stars
Thrash Hits	0/6 stars
Metal Hammer	4/5 stars

At Alternative Press, Phil Freeman rated the album four stars out of five, remarking how the release is "Emmure's latest slab of relentless, skull-battering deathcore" and it "finds them in top form." Elsewhere, the album was heavily panned. At Sputnikmusic, Davey Boy remarked how the album was "so unsubtle and earnest" in its "targeting of rage-filled teenage males, through aggressive, hateful and misogynistic words." Tomas Doyle of Thrash Hits called lead vocalist Frankie Palmeri a "very angry man", and unfavorably compared the album's controversial intentions to the brilliance of controversial artists like Marilyn Manson and Eminem. He went further as to say the album was "so fatally lacking in musical spark."

Nik Young of Metal Hammer praised the first half of the album, stating, "A short, panic-inducing opener full of samples, sirens, a huge roar and immediately offensive lyrics gets Eternal Enemies off to an awesome start. Unsurprisingly, the title of this track, Bring A Gun To School, also caused a ton of debate online. Emmure are nothing if not controversial and, love or hate their blunt, often clichéd lyrics, they certainly command attention." Young was, however, critical of the softer, latter half of the album, going on to say, "... the second half of this album does not live up to the first, and overly melodic 'We Were Just Kids,' makes for a weak closer."

== Track listing ==
No.	Title	Length
1.	"Bring a Gun to School (*)"	1:39
2.	"Nemesis"	2:52
3.	"N.I.A. (News in Arizona)"	3:29
4.	"The Hang Up"	2:52
5.	"A Gift a Curse"	4:10
6.	"E"	2:53
7.	"Like LaMotta"	2:47
8.	"Free Publicity"	2:21
9.	"Most Hated"	2:58
10.	"Grave Markings"	3:29
11.	"Hitomi's Shinobi"	3:28
12.	"Rat King"	2:34
13.	"Girls Don't Like Boys, Girls Like 40's and Blunts"	2:50
14.	"New Age Rambler"	2:47
15.	"We Were Just Kids"	3:38
Total length:		44:47

(*) = Title was later changed to "(Untitled)" on the album’s retail release.

== Commercial performance ==
The album debuted at No. 57 on the Billboard 200 (No. 55 in the Top Current Albums), and at No. 4 in the Top Hard Rock Albums chart with 6,475 copies sold in its debut week in the U.S.

== Personnel ==
Emmure

- Mark Castillo - drums
- Mark Davis - bass guitar
- Jesse Ketive - guitar
- Michael Mulholland - guitar
- Frankie Palmeri - vocals

Production

- Mixed & mastered by Joey Sturgis @ The Foundation Recording Studios, Connersville, Indiana
- Vocals recorded by Nick Scott & Allan Hessler @ Metro 37 Studios
- Guitar & bass recorded by Nick Scott
- Drums recorded by Joseph Hall
- Publicity by Rachel Rosenberg
- Booking by Amanda Fiore (The Pantheon Agency, US) & Marco Walzel (Avocado Booking, EU)
- Art & layout by Randy Pfeil
- Photo by Eric Richter & Dustin Smith

== Charts ==
Chart (2012)	Peak position
German Albums (Offizielle Top 100)	77
US Billboard 200	57
US Independent Albums (Billboard)	11
US Top Hard Rock Albums (Billboard)	4
