= The Respect Issue =

Studio album by Emmure
- Released: May 13, 2008
- Recorded: January–March 2008
- Studio: Planet Z Studios
- Genre: Metalcore; deathcore
- Length: 30:11
- Label: Victory
- Producer: Chris "Zeuss" Harris

Emmure chronology
Goodbye to the Gallows (2007)	The Respect Issue (2008)	Felony (2009)

Singles from The Respect Issue
- 1. "False Love in Real Life" Released: April 2008

Professional ratings
Review scores
Source	Rating
Allmusic	2.5/5 stars
AbsolutePunk.net	40%
Lambgoat	2/10 stars

The Respect Issue is the second album by American metalcore band Emmure. The album was released on May 13, 2008, with pre-orders available on March 11. Kurt Angle, professional wrestler and former Olympic wrestler, is featured as a boxer on the cover art and throughout the inlay. Angle also wore an Emmure shirt during broadcasts of TNA Impact! in promotion of the album. This is also the last studio release to feature founding members Ben and Joe Lionetti, who left the band in May 2009.

It debuted at number 141 in the Billboard 200, selling over 5,000 copies.

Snuff 2: The Resurrection refers to a quote that Max California (played by Joaquin Phoenix) in the 1999 film 8MM.

== Track listing ==
No.	Title	Length
1.	"Young, Rich, and Out of Control"	1:14
2.	"Sound Wave Superior"	2:42
3.	"I Only Mean Half of What I Don't Say"	2:40
4.	"False Love in Real Life"	3:42
5.	"Chicago's Finest"	2:46
6.	"Tales from the 'Burg"	3:43
7.	"Rough Justice"	3:10
8.	"Snuff 2: The Resurrection"	3:12
9.	"Dry Ice"	3:04
10.	"You're More Like Friend Without the "R""	3:02
Total length:		30:11

== Personnel ==
Emmure

- Frankie Palmeri - lead vocals
- Jesse Ketive - guitar
- Ben Lionetti - guitar
- Mark Davis - bass guitar
- Joe Lionetti - drums

Guests

- Gary Michel - additional vocals on 'Snuff 2: The Resurrection' and 'Tales from the 'Burg'
- Ryan Morgan - guitar solo on 'Chicago's Finest'

Production

- Produced, engineered, and mixed by Chris "Zeuss" Harris
- Mastered by Alan Douches at West West Side
- Management by Shawn Keith at Outerloop Management
- Photography by Matt Wysocki
- Photo Assistant by Jenni Lobb
- Art Direction And Layout by DoubleJ
- Booking by Amanda Fiore at TKO
