= Emmure =

American metalcore band

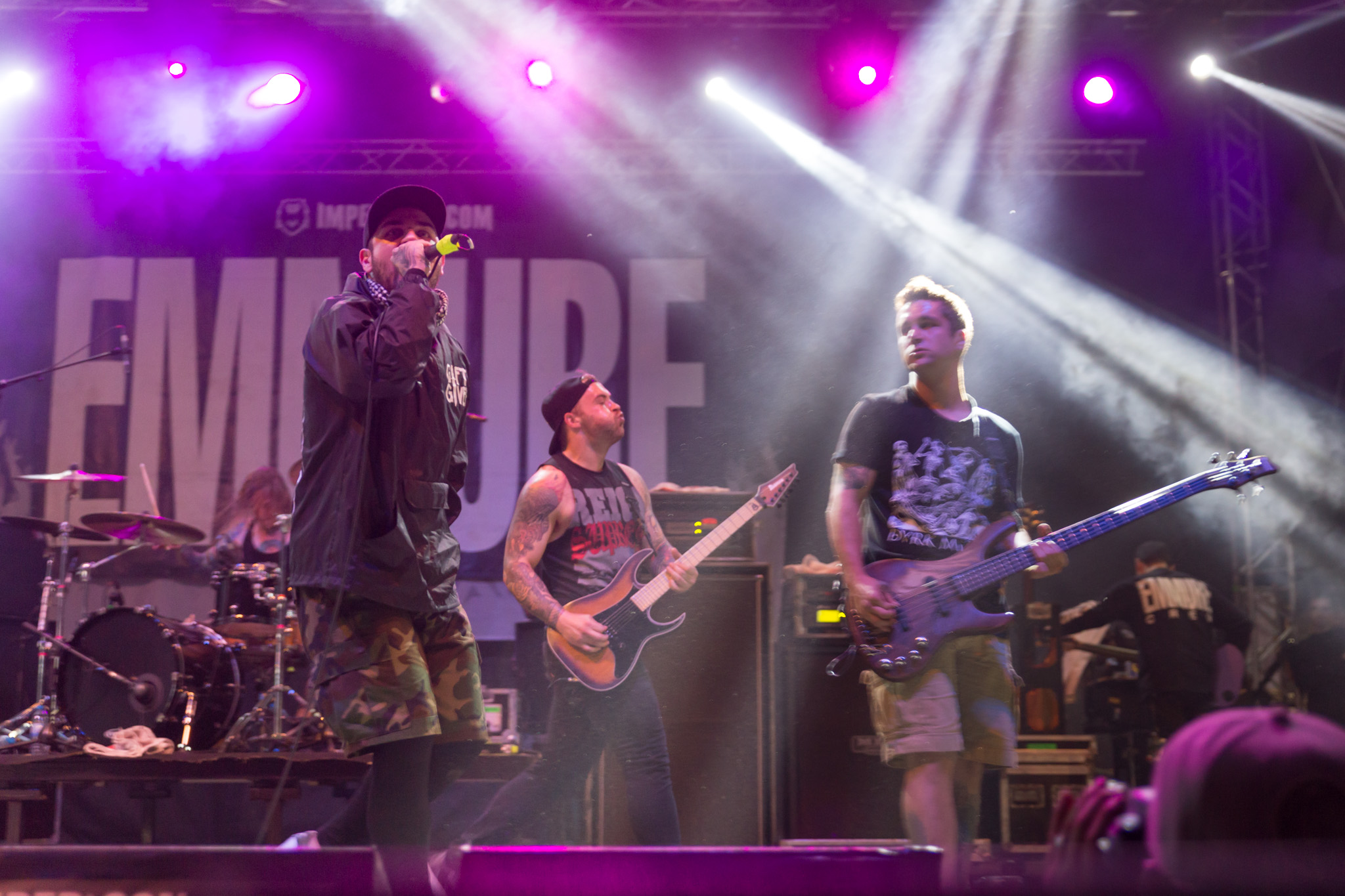
- Emmure at With Full Force 2014

Background information
- Origin: New Fairfield, Connecticut, U.S.
- Genres: Metalcore; deathcore; nu metal
- Years active: 2003–present
- Labels: SharpTone; Victory; This City Is Burning
- Members: Frankie Palmeri; Zach Allard; Zack Davis
- Past members: Jesse Ketive; Ben Lionetti; Joe Lionetti; Dan Steindler; Mark Davis; Mike Mulholland; Mike Kaabe; Mark Castillo; Phil Lockett; Josh Miller; Adam Pierce; Nicholas Pyatt; Joshua Travis
- Website: emmurecult.com

Emmure (/ɛˈmjuːr/) is an American metalcore band formed in 2003. Originally based in New Fairfield, Connecticut, before moving to Queens, New York, the group has released eight albums, with their first public release being a 2006 EP entitled The Complete Guide to Needlework.

Victory Records has worked with the band throughout most of their career, starting with Goodbye to the Gallows (2007). Their second, third and fourth albums The Respect Issue (2008), Felony (2009) and Speaker of the Dead (2011) were all distributed through Victory as well. After the band's initial four-album contract with Victory expired, they signed again with Victory to distribute their fifth and sixth studio albums, Slave to the Game (2012) and Eternal Enemies (2014). However after nine years of being signed to the label, Emmure would leave Victory in 2016 to sign with SharpTone. The seventh and eighth Emmure albums, titled Look at Yourself and Hindsight were released on March 3, 2017, and June 26, 2020, respectively.

The band's vocalist, Frankie Palmeri (born 1986), is the only remaining original member and has been subject to some controversy over the years. His personality has made the band unique from other acts in the genre, and critics have described his "no-fucks-given" attitude as an entertaining standpoint for the band.

== History ==
=== Early years ===
Emmure was started in 2003. Frankie Palmeri (from Queens, New York) met Joe and Ben Lionetti (from New Fairfield, Connecticut) through an internet message board. Palmeri then traveled to Connecticut to begin rehearsals together. Bassist Dan Steindler and guitarist Jesse Ketive, residents of New Fairfield and Queens, respectively, then joined when the three began another recruiting search for members. The band named themselves "Emmure", being a reference to the act of immurement, which is a form of execution.

In 2004, bassist Steindler left the band and was later replaced by Mark Davis, which marked the first ever lineup change in the band. Ketive was formerly in the band Warfix, in which he played guitar alongside Sean Murphy and Mike Kaabe of Endwell (Kaabe eventually joining Emmure himself in April 2009) and Bryan Goldsman of Southside Panic (and co-producer of Felony).

The band recorded some demo tapes and played local gigs around the New York area from 2003 - 2005. Palmeri proclaimed that in 2005, the band "started becoming more serious".

=== Victory Records signing and touring (2007–2012) ===
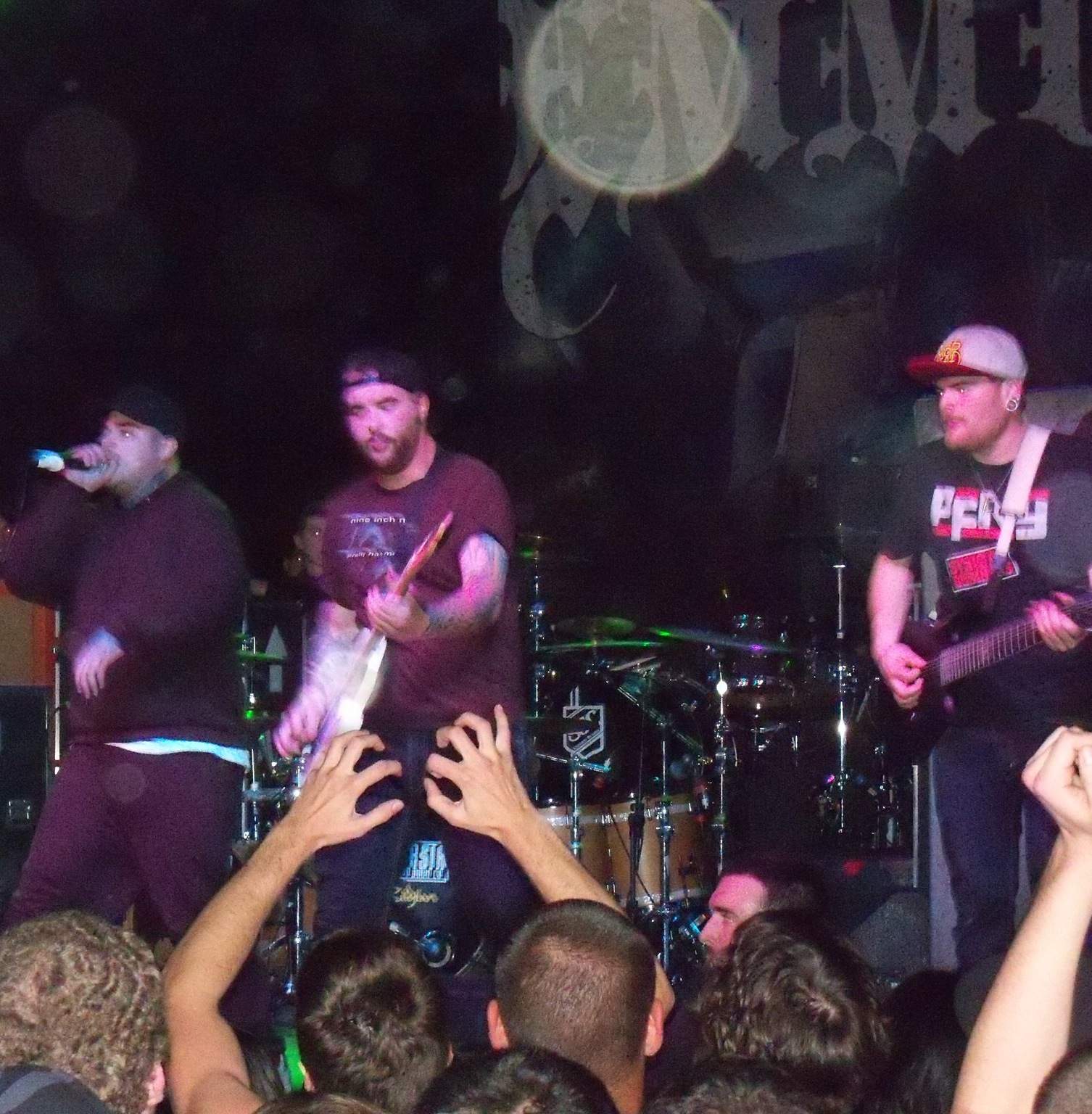
Emmure performing in 2010

In 2008, the band finished a tour in the lower 48 US states supporting Misery Signals, August Burns Red, and Burn Down Rome. That summer was spent on their headlining tour with Endwell, On Broken Wings, Ligeia, Recon, Unite and Conquer, Carnifex and others.

On May 1, 2009, rumors of the Lionetti brothers' departure from the band, due to conflict between members, were confirmed in a statement from Joe Lionetti. According to its page on Victory Records' web site, Emmure found a new guitarist and drummer in Mike Mulholland and Michael Kaabe, respectively. Mike Kaabe formerly played with Warfix, Hulk Blood, and Endwell and is also the step-brother of Emmure guitarist Jesse Ketive.

On June 20, 2009, the music video of "False Love in Real Life" was broadcast on MTV's Headbanger's Ball, which was directed by Frankie Nasso. Nasso previously directed the video to "Sound Wave Superior" as well. Emmure completed their third studio album, Felony, released on August 18, 2009, on Victory Records. The album, of which, is allegedly inspired by a real event in which vocalist Frankie Palmeri assaulted his best friend by "[hitting] him in the head with a bottle", which resulted in Palmeri being arrested. Following the release of the album, Emmure was announced as one of the groups to be featured on 2010's Warped Tour as well as The Bamboozle.

The group was included on Attack Attack!'s headlining This Is a Family Tour alongside Of Mice & Men, Pierce the Veil and In Fear and Faith. They embarked on the Reckless and Relentless Tour with Asking Alexandria, Chiodos, Miss May I, Evergreen Terrace, and Lower than Atlantis and have joined the Never Say Die! tour across Europe along with Parkway Drive, Comeback Kid, Bleeding Through, War From a Harlots Mouth, Your Demise and We Came as Romans. Emmure released their next album, Speaker of the Dead on February 15, 2011. On January 18, 2011, Emmure released a single from the album Demons with Ryu onto iTunes. On February 9, 2011, the music video for "Solar Flare Homicide" premiered. Speaker of the Dead debuted at number 68 on the Billboard 200 and number 11 on the top Independent Albums.

They toured in The Mosh Lives tour with Visions, We Set the Sun, Iwrestledabearonce, War from a Harlots Mouth, and Winds of Plague in Europe. The group also co-headlined the All Stars Tour in summer of 2011 with Alesana, Blessthefall, The Ghost Inside, In This Moment, Motionless in White, and many other bands. The band also co-headlined the Never Say Die tour with Vanna, The Human Abstract, As Blood Runs Black, The Word Alive, Deez Nuts, and Suicide Silence. In October 2011, drummer Mike Kaabe was fired from the band after multiple conflicts with the band's members as well as the band's manager.

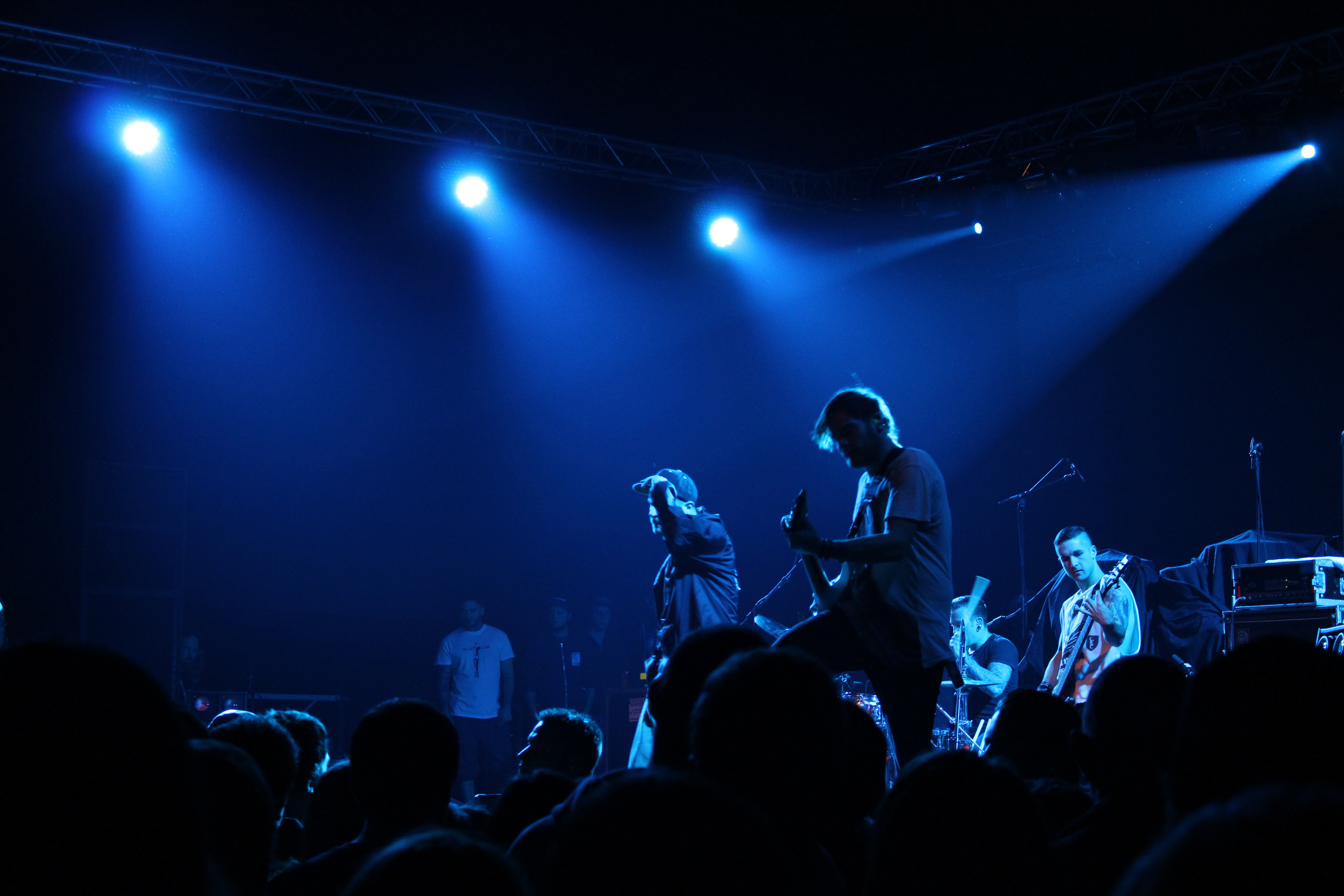
Emmure performing in Belgium in 2012

On January 4, 2012, guitarist Jesse Ketive confirmed that the band began recording their fifth album with producer Joey Sturgis, who produced their previous release Speaker of the Dead. Four days following this, Lambgoat revealed that ex-Bury Your Dead and Crossfade drummer Mark Castillo had joined Emmure for the recording of their fifth full-length. Castillo later confirmed that he would be leaving Crossfade to drum for Emmure full-time. The album was announced to be titled Slave to the Game and would be released on April 10, 2012. Prior to the recording of Slave to the Game, Emmure re-signed with Victory Records after their previous four-album contract's expiration. On February 3, 2012, Emmure released a video for "Drug Dealer Friend". On March 7, 2012, the band released their first single from Slave to the Game, entitled "Protoman", which was later released digitally, concurrently with the album's second single "I Am Onslaught". A video was later shot and released for "Protoman". On May 25, 2012, it was announced that the band was filming a video for the track "MDMA", thus making it the third single from Slave to the Game.

Slave to the Game was positively received by criticts, however, Palmeri has heavily panned the album insisting that it's a commercial failure. In a 2017 interview, he stated "The songs suck. It's just not good. None of the riffs are good. I just don't like it. I feel bad 'cause I let that record happen."

=== Continued success and controversy (2012–2015) ===
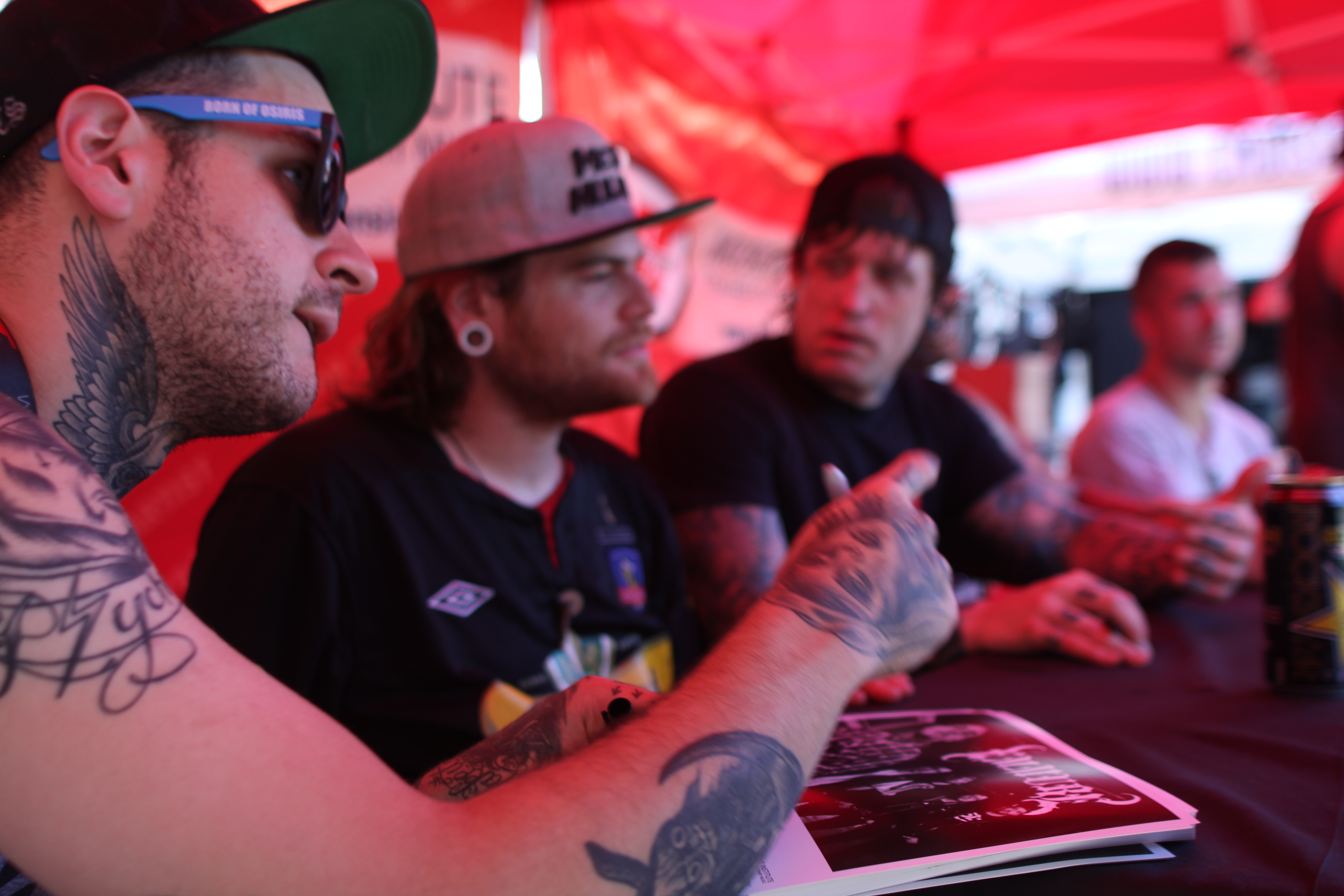
Emmure at a signing table during Mayhem Festival 2013

Emmure's frontman Frankie Palmeri was subject to controversy in 2012, when a line of T-shirts under his name began being produced that depicted an image of assailants Eric Harris and Dylan Klebold during the Columbine massacre coupled with the phrase "Shoot First Ask Questions Last" and another line with a scene from American History X which states "Violence As A Way of Life". Several journalists criticized the designs as "poorly designed" and "terribly offensive" while lacking any purpose or social commentary other than to stir controversy. Additionally, Palmeri has been quoted in a variety of online rants in which he uses the words "faggot" and "nigga" repeatedly, moves which have caused some observers to label him racist and homophobic.

From July 13 – August 28, 2012, Emmure took part in Metal Hammer's "Trespass America Festival" headlined by Five Finger Death Punch with additional support from Battlecross, God Forbid, Pop Evil, Trivium and Killswitch Engage. The band also confirmed they had once again re-signed with Victory Records for their sixth album, which was recorded towards the end of 2013 with a planned release for Spring 2014. On February 18, they announced the release of their sixth album, Eternal Enemies, which was released via Victory Records on April 15, 2014.

With the release of a track listing for Eternal Enemies on February 18, 2014, the band sparked another bit of controversy based around the name of the first track, "Bring a Gun to School", leading their ex-rhythm guitarist Ben Lionetti to post a statement regarding his former band and addressing the track, and referring to Palmeri as a "disgusting human being". He threatened legal action against the band, the label that holds them and their management in order to reclaim what is "owed to him" and his brother Joe, who is also a former member of the band. Ultimately, Emmure changed the title of the song to simply "(Untitled)" due to the outcry.

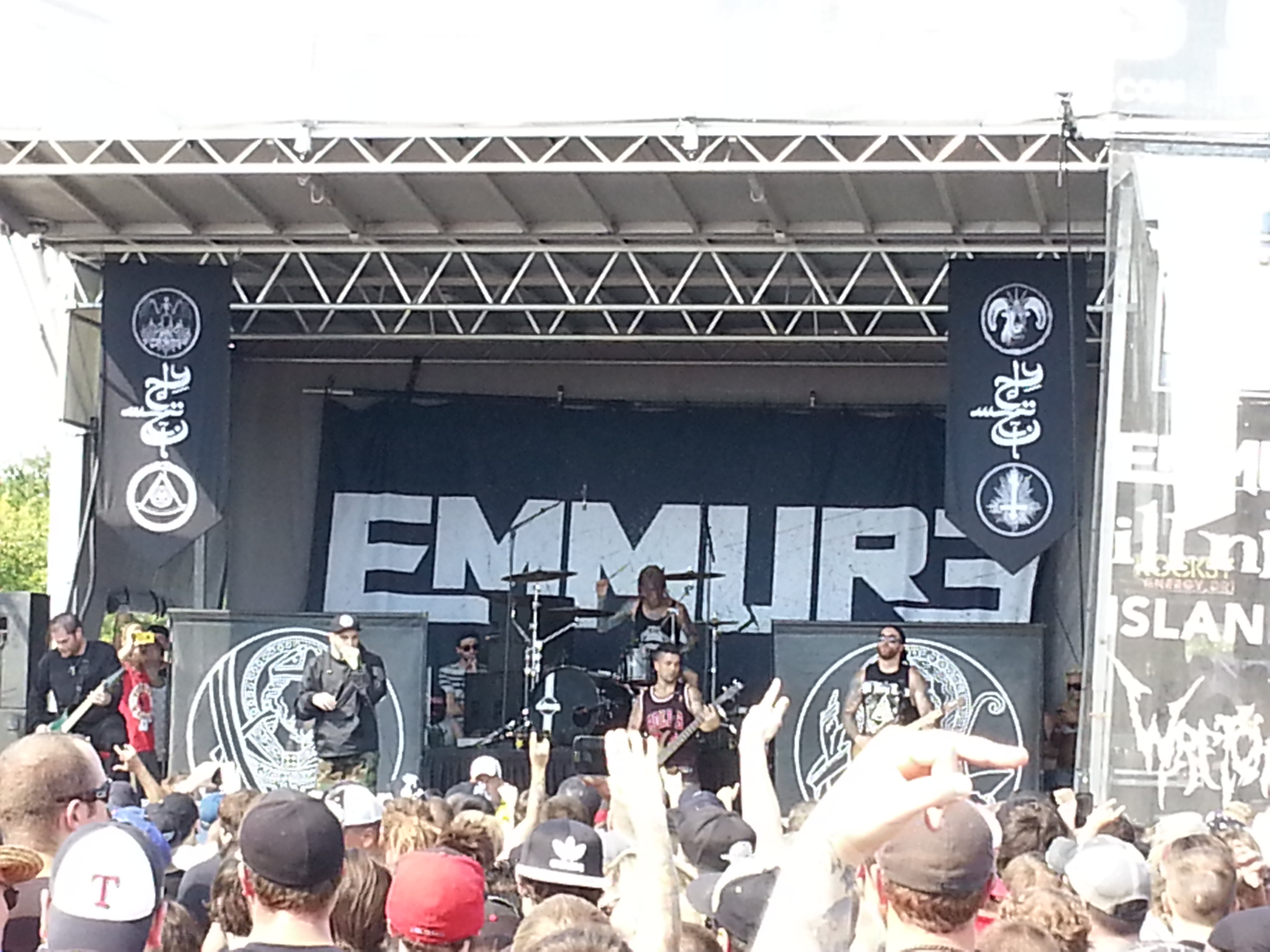
Emmure performing at Mayhem Festival 2014

It was officially announced on July 2 that drummer Castillo quit the band "under amicable circumstances." The same month, rapper Riff Raff released a remix of his song "2 Girls 1 Pipe" that features Frankie Palmeri. Emmure also supported Parkway Drive on their Atlas 2012 European tour with The Word Alive and Structures also joining them from November 11 to December 12. The band was also featured on the entire Rockstar Energy Mayhem Festival in 2014 with bands like Avenged Sevenfold, Korn, Cannibal Corpse, Suicide Silence, Trivium, Asking Alexandria, Miss May I, Veil of Maya, Upon a Burning Body and Body Count.

On November 20, 2014, Emmure began their headline US tour, the Eternal Enemies Tour. In support were The Acacia Strain, Fit for a King, Kublai Khan, and Sylar. The tour ended on December 21, 2014, in New York. Stray from the Path was originally slated to also appear on the tour, but dropped off weeks before its commencement to allow them to finish an upcoming album. It was simultaneously announced that Sylar would take their place on the tour. The Eternal Enemies Tour was much anticipated due to the fact that Emmure and The Acacia Strain once had a well publicized feud back in 2009, which has since cooled, and both co-headlined the tour. The two bands' former feud was often parodied by promotional posters for the tour, including a bill and a teaser video both advertising that the tour was "Emmure vs. The Acacia Strain".

In February 2015, Emmure and Suicide Silence did a co-headlining tour in the United States with support from Within the Ruins and Fit for an Autopsy. However, vocalist Palmeri damaged his voice and was unable to perform for a leg of the tour. He was, however, able to return to singing again on March 13. A European tour with Caliban, Thy Art Is Murder and Sworn In was also announced. But it was canceled since Palmeri still had severe acute and chronic reflux laryngitis and a weak left vocal cord. Emmure began to tour again in September with Hatebreed at the UK's GhostFest. As well as two headlining shows in Russia with Born of Osiris as support. In October 2015, Emmure was originally going to support All That Remains and We Came as Romans on the Hardrive Live Fallout tour. But due to personal issues within the band, Emmure dropped off the tour.

=== Lineup departure, new members, and Look at Yourself (2015–2018) ===
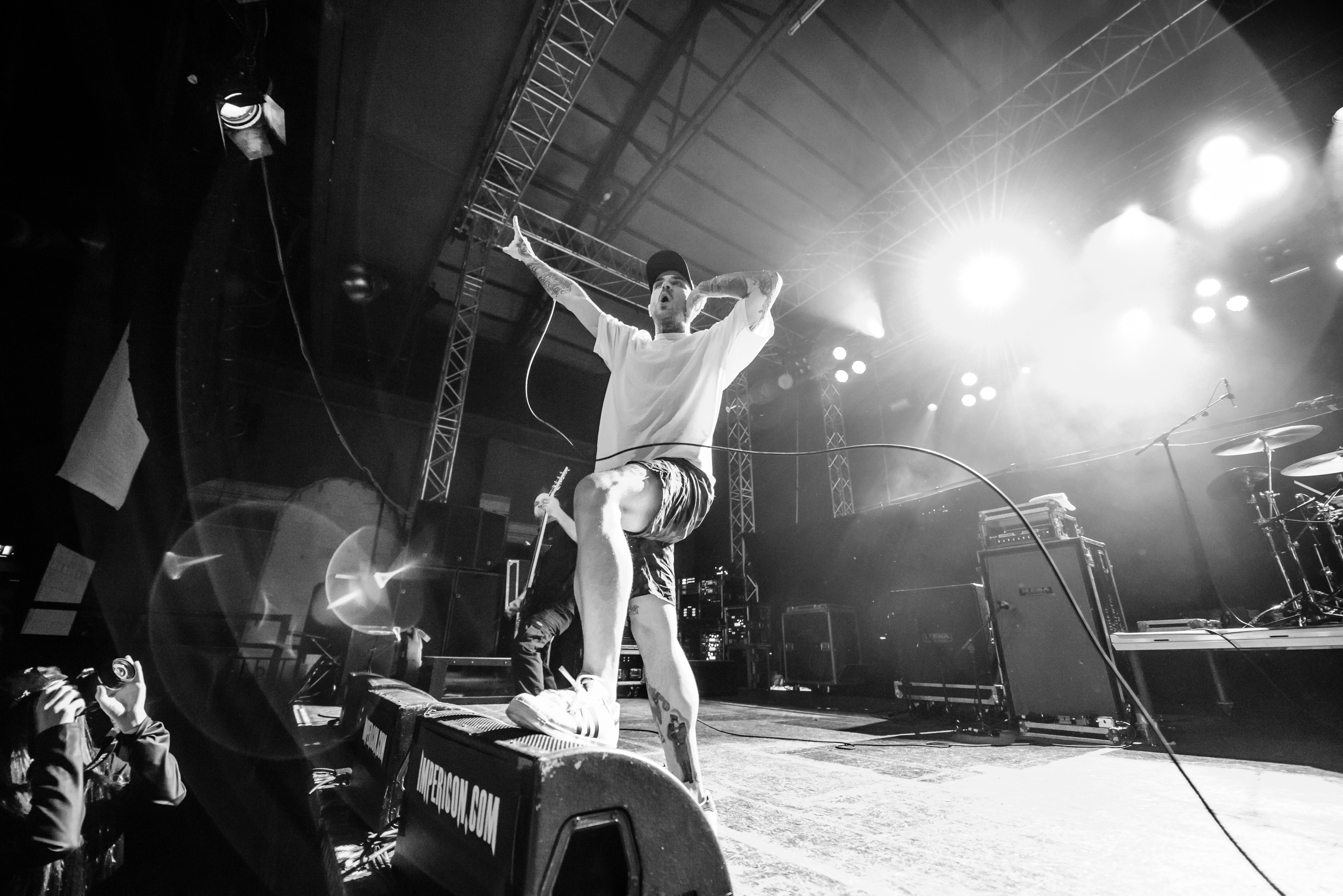
Emmure performing in Germany in 2016

On December 22, 2015, it was reported by mass sources including Alternative Press and Lambgoat that all members apart from vocalist Frankie Palmeri had departed from the group. There is a conflicting debate on the reason for the members' exit. Longtime bassist Mark Davis announced that he would be forming a project of his own, and stated in another interview that the reason for the members' exit from Emmure involved Palmeri not letting the band play a line of scheduled US shows, he concluded this by saying "If someone is bringing you down or holding you back from your full potential, it's time to cut them out, no matter how much you may love them." Palmeri, on the other hand, stated in an interview with Blabbermouth; "to me, they lost the passion for playing in Emmure a long time ago." Months later, Palmeri revealed the new Emmure lineup during a comeback show Oberhausen, Germany, which includes current and past members of Glass Cloud and the then defunct Tony Danza Tapdance Extravaganza.

Emmure announced their departure from Victory Records on October 13, 2016, and had signed with SharpTone Records, while also releasing the first single "Torch" from their upcoming album, titled Look at Yourself. On December 16, 2016, the band released "Russian Hotel Aftermath", the second single.

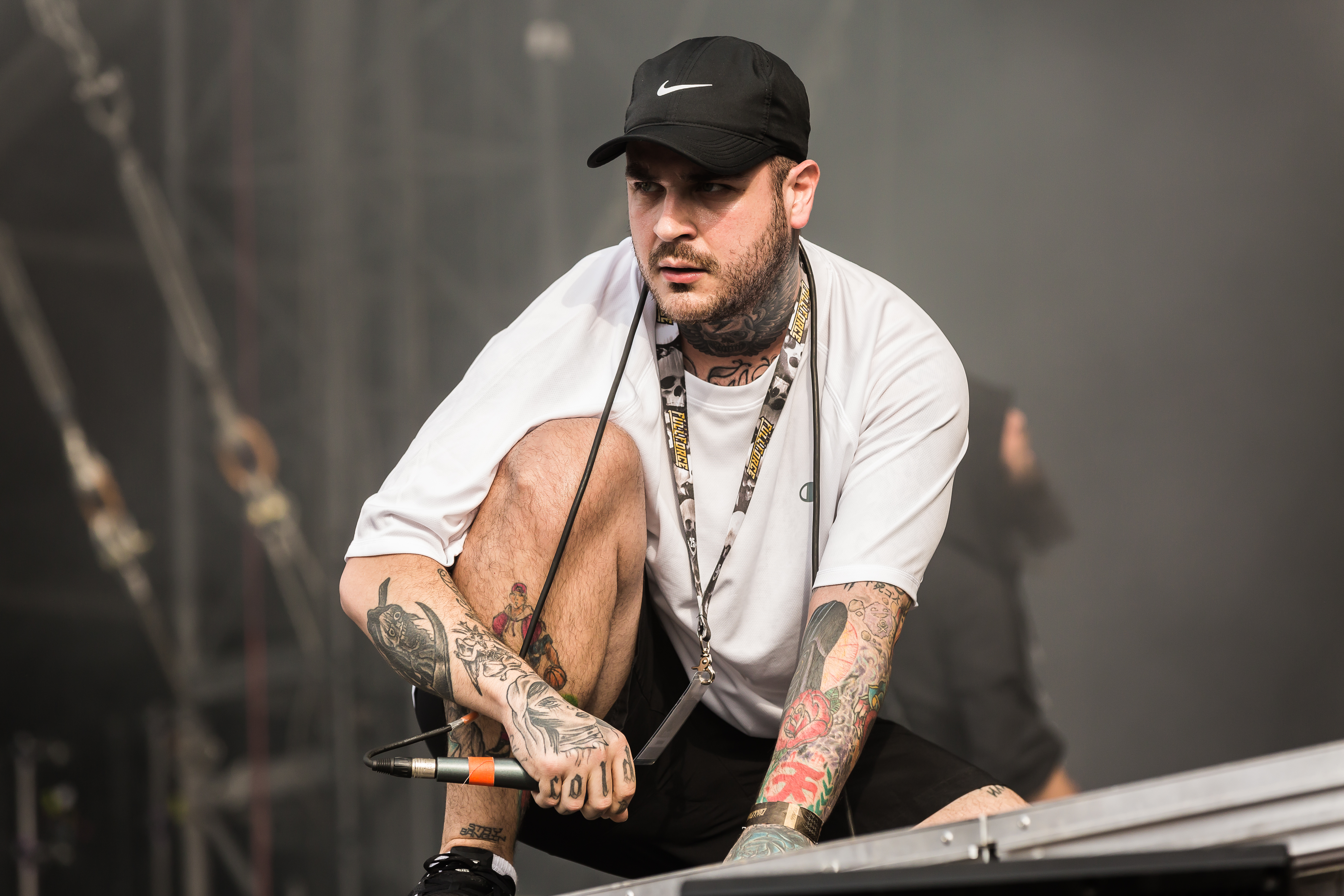
Vocalist Frankie Palmeri live at With Full Force 2018

Emmure toured well into 2017, the band supported After the Burial on their Carry the Flame tour alongside Fit for A King, Fit for An Autopsy and Invent, Animate in the Winter of 2017. Emmure also played on the entire 2017 Vans Warped Tour, the band appeared on the Monster Energy Stage. Emmure also returned to Europe in the Fall of 2017, playing on the Never Say Die tour. They headlined the tour alongside Deez Nuts and Chelsea Grin. Kublai Khan, Sworn In, Polaris and Lorna Shore all joined up as support on the tour. Emmure returned to Australia in the February 2018, as they supported Thy Art is Murder on their headliner with Fit for an Autopsy and Justice for the Damned also rounding up the lineup. The band also did a short run in Japan during February. Emmure did a USA headliner in the Spring of 2018, Counterparts, King 810 and Varials all joined the tour as main support. Emmure opened up for Thy Art is Murder once again on the European Death Dealers tour. Miss May I and Knocked Loose were also part of the lineup. In the Fall of 2018, Emmure and Stick to Your Guns co-headlined a tour throughout the Fall of 2018. Wage War and Sanction joined the lineup as support.

=== Hindsight (2019–present) ===
In the Spring of 2019, Emmure headlined another European tour once again with Rise of the North Star, Obey the Brave, Fit for A King and Alpha Wolf.

Vocalist Frankie Palmeri confirmed via a tweet on August 19, 2019, that the band had entered the studio to begin recording their eighth full-length album. The band opened up for As I Lay Dying on their Shaped by Fire Tour with After the Burial. Emmure will open up for As I Lay Dying once again, this time in Europe with Whitechapel and Une Misère joining the lineup.

On October 31, 2019, the band released a new single "PIGS EAR" and also tweeted "HINDSIGHT IS 2020". On March 13, 2020, they released the album's second single "Gypsy Disco"(Directed by Eric DiCarlo/SquareUp Studios) continuing with the quote "HINDSIGHT IS 2020" on Twitter.

After recording of the album had finished members moved onto other projects. When the COVID-19 pandemic began members began needing to gain more revenue. Guitarist Joshua Travis has released new solo music, Josh "Baby J" Miller began a new band with Chelsea Grin vocalist Tom Barber called Darko US. and Frankie Palmeri has begun streaming on twitch and revived his podcast.

On May 29, 2020, the band released the album's third single "Uncontrollable Descent" not only with the slogan "HINDSIGHT IS 2020" but the album cover and the song features a sample saying "HINDSIGHT" in the outro. The band then released the fourth single "I've Scene God" on June 12, 2020.

On July 28, 2021, drummer Josh Miller announced his departure from Emmure.

On February 7, 2026, Joshua Travis announced his departure from Emmure during a Twitch stream. Later that month, the band was announced as part of the lineup for the Louder Than Life music festival in Louisville, scheduled to take place in September.

== Artistry ==
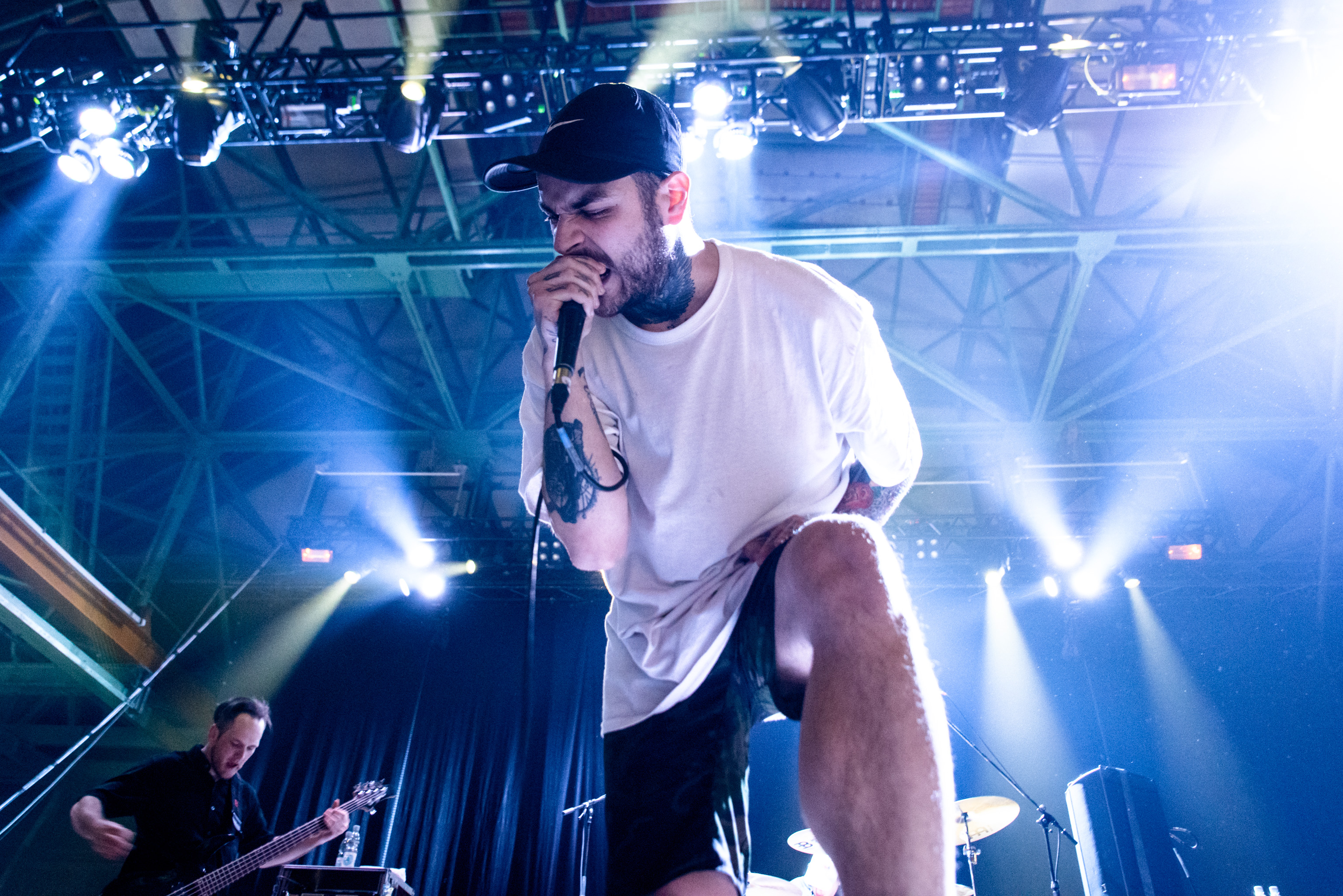
Vocalist Frankie Palmeri has a broad array of influences.

=== Musical style and influences ===
Emmure has been described as deathcore, metalcore, and extreme metal. They have also used elements of nu metal. The band has received both praise and criticism for the abundance of breakdowns in their music. Spoken words, death growls, shrieks, breakdowns, rapping and dissonant chords are often featured in Emmure's music.

Frankie Palmeri has stated that he is influenced by Fred Durst of Limp Bizkit and Jonathan Davis of Korn. The band are also influenced by Meshuggah, Chimaira, Fear Factory, Candiria and Hatebreed. Palmeri expresses much admiration for Faith No More singer Mike Patton and has cited his advice as a guide for his own vocal approach.

=== Lyrical themes ===
Lyrical topics that Emmure touches upon usually focus on breakups, social indifference, philosophy, and religion. Many of the band's songs contain references to video games and comic books, particularly from Street Fighter and Marvel Comics, of which vocalist Frankie Palmeri is an avid fan. However, in a 2013 interview with Get Your Rock Out, Palmeri explained that he would not be writing songs based on metaphors involving Marvel Comics characters any longer as he felt that "those avenues are not the correct catharsis for the band anymore." The band's lyrics have also made references to oral sex and choking.

On February 15, 2020, Frankie Palmieri tweeted about his past lyrics, saying he "rejected the person he was" but he "didn't regret anything (he said)".

== Band members ==
Current

- Frankie Palmeri – vocals (2003–present)
- Zach Allard – drums (2023–present)
- Zack Davis – bass (2023–present)

Former

- Dan Steindler – bass (2003–2004)
- Ben Lionetti – rhythm guitar (2003–2009)
- Joe Lionetti – drums (2003–2009)
- Mike Kaabe – drums (2009–2011)
- Mark Castillo – drums (2011–2014)
- Jesse Ketive – lead guitar (2003–2015); programming (2009–2015)
- Mike Mulholland – rhythm guitar (2009–2015)
- Mark Davis – bass (2004–2015)
- Adam Pierce – drums (2014–2015)
- Phil Lockett – bass (2016–2018)
- Josh "Baby J" Miller – drums (2016–2021)
- Nicholas Pyatt – bass (2018–2019)
- Joshua Travis – guitars, programming (2016–2026)

Timeline

== Discography ==
Studio albums

- Goodbye to the Gallows (2007)
- The Respect Issue (2008)
- Felony (2009)
- Speaker of the Dead (2011)
- Slave to the Game (2012)
- Eternal Enemies (2014)
- Look at Yourself (2017)
- Hindsight (2020)

== Filmography ==
Enemy Lines (2014) – directed by Cole Dabney
