= Bury Your Dead =

American metalcore band

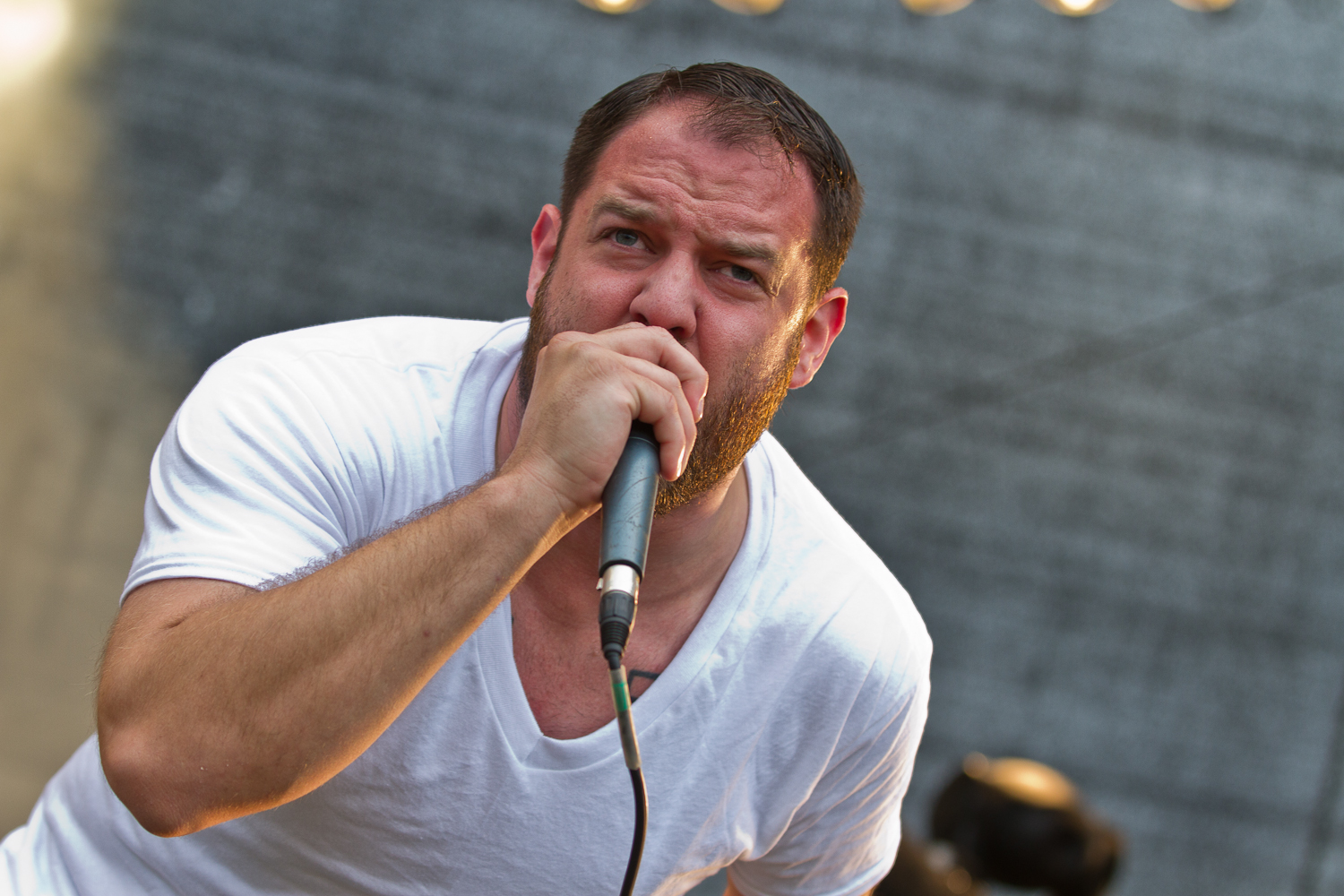
- Vocalist Mat Bruso

Background information
- Origin: Boston, Massachusetts, U.S.
- Genres: Metalcore; beatdown hardcore
- Years active: 2001–2025
- Labels: Stay Sick; Mediaskare; Victory; Eulogy; Alveran
- Members: Mark Castillo; Brendan "Slim" MacDonald; Mat Bruso; Aaron Patrick; Chris Cain
- Past members: Brendan "Slim" MacDonald; Rich Casey; Steve Kent; Joe Krewko; Jesse Viens; Myke Terry; Michael Crafter; Mike Nunez; Eric Ellis; Dan O'Connor; Rich Gaccione; Jay Crowe; Chris Towning; Matt Lacasse; Dustin Schoenhofer; Chris Sansone; Sean Chamilian

Bury Your Dead was an American metalcore band from Boston, Massachusetts, formed in 2001. The final lineup included guitarist Chris Towning, lead vocalist Mat Bruso, drummer Mark Castillo, and bassist Aaron Patrick. To date, they have had eight releases: one EP (Bury Your Dead), one live DVD (Alive), and six studio albums (You Had Me at Hello, Cover Your Tracks, Beauty and the Breakdown, Bury Your Dead, It's Nothing Personal and Mosh n' Roll).

== History ==
=== You Had Me at Hello (2001–2002) ===
In 2001, Bury Your Dead began as a side project of the band Hamartia featuring drummer Mark Castillo and guitarist Brendan "Slim" MacDonald. With the metalcore sound of Hamartia growing tiresome to both of them, they started writing less technical songs in their free time. They recruited Steve Kent to play bass, second guitarist Jesse Viens, and Joe Krewko as vocalist and began playing shows in Massachusetts and Connecticut under the name Bury Your Dead. News of their unbridled energy and destructive live show spread immediately around the East Coast hardcore scenes and the band was courted by Alveran/Eulogy.

The band recorded and released their debut album titled You Had Me at Hello in 2002, borrowed a van, then toured in support of it. After several successful tours, Bury Your Dead decided to go their separate ways. Castillo moved back to Philadelphia and began touring with Between the Buried and Me, bassist Rich Casey went back to running his own screen-printing business and MacDonald began playing guitar in the band Blood Has Been Shed.

=== Cover Your Tracks (2002–2005) ===
After several months had passed, Casey contacted MacDonald and expressed his interest in reforming Bury Your Dead. They rounded up some of their old lineup, with a few others to fill in, and played some shows before heading down to Florida to play the annual Gainesville Fest. After acquiring vocalist Mat Bruso, they ran into their old drummer, Castillo, who was touring with Between the Buried and Me, and they discussed their desire to make Bury Your Dead a serious band again. Castillo agreed, and the band did a few short tours as well as appearances at hardcore festivals including Hellfest and The New England Metal and Hardcore Festival.

With their lineup in place Bury Your Dead was approached by Victory Records in July 2003 and they signed a deal with the label the following spring, while on tour with Walls of Jericho and Martyr AD. Bury Your Dead spent the next several months touring and when summer approached they holed up in Massachusetts to write news songs, which would comprise their Victory Records debut titled Cover Your Tracks. They entered the studio in June 2004, choosing to record at Q-Division studios in Somerville, Massachusetts, with producer Matthew Ellard.

Cover Your Tracks was released October 19, 2004. The band toured heavily in support of the album and on May 10, 2005, filmed a live DVD/CD combo at Chain Reaction in Anaheim, California. The DualDisc-format release, titled Alive, hit shelves on July 12, 2005, while the band was touring with As I Lay Dying, Rob Zombie, Arch Enemy, It Dies Today and many other bands on the second-stage of that year's Ozzfest.

On July 24, 2005, actor/rapper Will Smith and his wife Jada Pinkett Smith, who fronts Wicked Wisdom, rapped/jammed with Bury Your Dead during the last song of the band's set at Ozzfest 2005 at the Nissan Pavilion in Bristow, Virginia.

=== Beauty and the Breakdown (2006–2007) ===
In July 2006 Bury Your Dead released Beauty and the Breakdown, which was produced by Jason Suecof (Trivium, God Forbid). Prior to the making of the album, Aaron "Bubble" Patrick replaced Casey on bass. Around this time the quintet could be found on artist Derek Hess' nationwide Strhess Tour, alongside acts like Shadows Fall, Poison the Well, and Throwdown. In the fall, Bury Your Dead participated in the 2006 Family Values Tour as well as a few co-headlining off-dates with Walls of Jericho.

In January 2007, after a tour with Killswitch Engage and Hatebreed, vocalist Mat Bruso left the band to focus on "more important things like going back to school to become a teacher."

In March 2007 Michael Crafter, former vocalist of I Killed the Prom Queen and Carpathian, briefly took over vocal duties for the "Don't Call It A Comeback Tour". In May 2007 he left mid-tour and returned to Australia, citing homesickness at the time. Crafter later revealed that the "chaos" and "psycho" environment that surrounded the band contributed to his departure. He said there were "crazy, big fights every night" at the band's shows, and that the band members also regularly got into fights, including with each other. The frontman added that the tense and violent gang culture that surrounded the band and their associates, who were all heavily armed, made touring "awkward".

Following Crafter's departure Bury Your Dead quickly appointed Myke Terry, previously of hardcore band Cassius, to perform vocals.

=== Bury Your Dead (2008–2009) ===
The band soon announced that Terry had become the permanent vocalist of Bury Your Dead. The band entered on tour with Nonpoint, Machine Head, and Hellyeah on the "More Balls, More Volume, More Strength Tour". After a February 16, 2008 show on the tour, guitarist Eric Ellis was attacked and beaten by six gang members in Milwaukee, Wisconsin. Ellis received 19 stitches on his head and Bury Your Dead's tour was postponed. The scuffle reportedly occurred after the attackers held up Ellis at gunpoint and stole what was described in the police report as "a bag of jewelry."

On March 18, Bury Your Dead released their self-titled album. It was the first album to feature Myke Terry on vocals. The album featured Alter Bridge guitarist Mark Tremonti, who contributed a guest solo to the track "Year One".

Bury Your Dead opened up for Parkway Drive on a European Tour in the Spring of 2008. Suicide Silence & To Kill also joined on the lineup.

Ellis then left the band due to "medical reasons and personality differences." Later, in 2012, he was sentenced to 20 years in a federal prison for his involvement in a Jacksonville gang responsible for numerous crimes. In 2013, he released a solo album. Chris Towning, who had been filling in for several months, was announced as his replacement.

On September 24, 2008, Bury Your Dead was involved in a van accident in Ottawa, Ontario, Canada. Bassist Aaron Patrick was driving the vehicle, which rolled several times before ending up in a ditch. Guitarist Brendan MacDonald had reportedly undergone surgery to repair lacerations to his leg while Patrick suffered a broken arm and singer Myke Terry broke his hand. Police subsequently charged Patrick with "failing to drive in a marked lane."

=== It's Nothing Personal (2009–2010) ===
Prior to the May 26 release of Bury Your Dead's fifth studio album, titled It's Nothing Personal, on April 28 they released their new single, "Hurting Not Helping", which became available over iTunes. Weeks later they released another single, "Broken Body". The album has been described by some as having a more melodic feel than the band's previous efforts and was recorded/engineered by Shane Frisby and Peter Rutcho who have worked with acts such as Widow Sunday, Hell Within, and Corpus Christi.

In support of the new album, Bury Your Dead embarked on a few nationwide tours, including Disturbed's Music as a Weapon IV tour (along with bands like Killswitch Engage and Suicide Silence) and The Deathless Tour with Throwdown, For Today, Abacabb, and The World We Knew. A few months prior to The Deathless Tour, Patrick left Bury Your Dead. He was replaced with Chris Cain, the former guitarist of For the Fallen Dreams and Elysia.

On November 24, 2010, Mark Castillo was announced as the new drummer for Crossfade. In January 2012, Castillo left the group and joined Emmure.

=== Mosh n' Roll and break up (2011–2025) ===
On January 17, 2011, it was announced that Myke Terry was leaving the band to pursue a solo career, as former vocalist Mat Bruso rejoined the band. In a 2011 interview, Terry seemed to indicate that his leaving the band was not necessarily all by choice, stating that "I never thought someone who hadn't sweat, bled, or cried with us would have the power to dictate the inner workings of our band." It was confirmed by Mediaskare Records that Mark Castillo had recorded drums for the new album, but as of their first returning show (NEHMF, April 15) Mark was noted to have left the band and Mat announced that Dustin Schoenhofer, previously of Walls of Jericho, has taken over on drums. In addition, Aaron "Bubble" Patrick rejoined the band to replace bassist Chris Cain, although his absence on the Over the Limit Tour with Evergreen Terrace and For the Fallen Dreams has yet to be explained. Sean Chamilian of Betrayal filled in for him. The band posted new songs on the official Mediaskare YouTube channel, entitled "Slaughterhouse-Five", "Bluebeard" and "Deadeye Dick" prior to the release of Mosh n' Roll on August 2, 2011.

In early 2013, it was announced that guitarist Chris Towning officially joined DevilDriver as their permanent bassist.

In January 2016, Bury Your Dead announced that they will be playing shows in 2016, with Aaron Patrick and Mark Castillo re-joining the band.

On March 22, 2019, Bury Your Dead released a new single titled "Collateral" and announced that they had signed with Stay Sick Recordings.

On October 11, 2019, Bury Your Dead released a new EP titled "We Are Bury Your Dead". The album features 5 tracks named after Tom Cruise films.

During the band's set at FurnaceFest 2024, vocalist Mat Bruso announced that it would be his final performance with Bury Your Dead. In April 2025, it was announced that Bruso would return for some final shows with the band, which would also feature the return of Brendan MacDonald.

== Band members ==
Final line-up

- Mat Bruso – lead vocals (2003–2007, 2011–2024, 2025)
- Mark Castillo – drums (2001–2002, 2004–2011, 2016–2025)
- Brendan "Slim" MacDonald – guitars (2001–2019, 2025), bass (2001, 2011–2016), lead vocals (2001)
- Aaron "Bubble" Patrick – bass (2006–2009, 2011, 2016–2025)
- Chris Cain – bass (2009–2011, touring 2022–2024), guitar (touring 2021, 2024–2025)

Former members

- Chris Towning – guitars (2008–2023), bass (2011–2016)
- Mark Hundley – vocals (2001)
- Steve Kent – bass (2001–2002)
- Rich Casey – bass (2001, 2003–2006)
- Jesse Viens – guitars (2001–2002)
- Joe Krewko – lead vocals (2001–2003)
- Jay Crowe – guitars (2002)
- Rich Gaccione – guitars (2002–2003)
- Matt Lacasse – bass (2002–2003)
- Mike Nunez – lead vocals (2003)
- Dan O'Connor – guitars (2003) (touring 2024)
- Chris Sansone – drums (2003)
- Eric Ellis – guitars (2004–2008)
- Michael Crafter – lead vocals (2007)
- Myke Terry – lead vocals (2007–2011)
- Sean Chamilian – bass (2011)
- Dustin Schoenhofer – drums (2011–2015)
- Mike Mulholland – guitar (touring 2019–2023)

== Discography ==
=== Studio albums ===
Year	Album details	Peak chart positions		
Year	Album details	US	US Heat.	US Ind.
2002	You Had Me at Hello: Released: March 5, 2002; Label: Alveran	—	—	—
2004	Cover Your Tracks: Released: October 19, 2004; Label: Victory	—	—	—
2006	Beauty and the Breakdown: Released: July 11, 2006; Label: Victory	129	1	8
2008	Bury Your Dead: Released: March 18, 2008; Label: Victory	176	6	22
2009	It's Nothing Personal: Released: May 26, 2009; Label: Victory	142	2	20
2011	Mosh n' Roll: Released: August 2, 2011; Label: Mediaskare	141	3	24
"—" denotes a release that did not chart.

=== EPs ===
- We Are Bury Your Dead (2019)
