= Legendary (Zao album) =

Greatest hits album by Zao
- Released: December 17, 2003
- Recorded: Trax East, New Jersey
- Genre: Metalcore
- Length: 60:02
- Label: Solid State/Tooth & Nail/EMI
- Producer: Eric Rachel and Zao

Zao chronology
All Else Failed (2003)	Legendary (2003)	The Funeral of God (2004)

Professional ratings
Review scores
Source	Rating
AllMusic	3/5 stars
Exclaim!	Recommended
Punknews	3/5 stars

Legendary is the first compilation album by American metalcore band Zao. It was released on December 17, 2003, on Solid State/Tooth & Nail/EMI. It is the eighth album by the group. The last three songs are previously unreleased studio demos with Corey Darst on vocals. "The Icarus Complex" appeared on This is Solid State Vol.3.

== Track listing ==
No.	Title	Writer(s)	Original album (Year)	Length
1.	"Skin Like Winter"	Daniel Weyandt	Training for Utopia / Zao (1998)	2:21
2.	"5 Year Winter"	Scott Mellinger, Jesse Smith, Weyandt	(Self-Titled) (2001)	2:26
3.	"A Fall Farewell"	Russ Cogdell, Brett Detar, Smith, Weyandt	Where Blood and Fire Bring Rest (1998)	2:51
4.	"Suspend/Suspension"	Mellinger, Smith, Weyandt	Parade of Chaos (2002)	5:50
5.	"Walk On By, Walk On Me"	Cogdell, Detar, Smith, Weyandt	Training for Utopia / Zao (1998)	2:56
6.	"Ravage Ritual"	Cogdell, Detar, Smith, Weyandt	Where Blood and Fire Bring Rest (1998)	3:09
7.	"Times of Separation"	Shawn Jones, Roy Goudy, Mic Cox, Smith	The Splinter Shards the Birth of Separation (1997)	4:56
8.	"Savannah"	Rob Horner, Weyandt, Mellinger, Cogdell, Smith	Liberate Te Ex Inferis (1999)	2:47
9.	"The Race of Standing Still"	Mellinger, Smith, Weyandt	(Self-Titled) (2001)	5:06
10.	"Free the Three"	Mellinger, Smith, Weyandt	Parade of Chaos (2002)	4:02
11.	"Angel Without Wings"	Mellinger, Smith, Weyandt	Parade of Chaos (2002)	3:42
12.	"Ember"	Cogdell, Detar, Smith, Weyandt	Where Blood and Fire Bring Rest (1998)	2:26
13.	"The Ghost Psalm"	Weyandt, Mellinger, Cogdell, Smith, Horner	Liberate Te Ex Inferis (1999)	5:40
14.	"Trashcanhands (Keyboard Cowards)"	Mellinger	(Self-Titled) (2001)
15.	"The Icarus Complex" (demo)	Corey Darst, Mellinger, Horner, Smith	Previously unreleased	2:29
16.	"One Last Time" (demo)	Darst, Mellinger, Horner, Smith	Previously unreleased	2:55
17.	"All Dressed Up (With No Place to Go)" (demo)	Darst, Mellinger, Horner, Smith	Previously unreleased	2:51
Total length:				60:02

== Credits ==
- Dan Weyandt – vocals (tracks 1–6, 8–14)
- Scott Mellinger – guitar, bass (tracks 2, 4, 8–11, 13–17)
- Russ Cogdell – guitar, bass (tracks 1, 3, 5–6, 8, 13)
- Jesse Smith – drums, guitar, vocals
- Rob Horner – bass (tracks 8 and 13)
- Brett Detar – guitar, bass (tracks 6 and 12)
- Shawn Jonas – vocals (track 7)
- Roy Goudy – guitar (track 7)
- Mic Cox – bass (track 7)
- Corey Darst – vocals (tracks 15–17)
