= Barry Poynter =

American record producer

- Also known as: Mr. Poynter
- Born
- Origin: Little Rock, Arkansas, U.S.
- Genres: Metal, punk rock, hardcore punk
- Occupations: Record producer, audio engineer, guitarist
- Instrument: Guitar
- Years active: 1993–present
- Formerly of: 2 Minute Hate

Barry Poynter is an American record producer. He has produced albums for many bands and musicians, such as Soul Embraced, Society's Finest, Living Sacrifice, and The Juliana Theory. He is also a former member of 2 Minute Hate.

== Discography ==
- All Else Failed by Zao (1996)
- Twelve-Point Master Plan by Bobgoblin (1997)
- Reborn by Living Sacrifice (1997)
- Where Blood and Fire Bring Rest by Zao (1998)
- Embrace the Eternal by Embodyment (1998)
- Cloned Slaves for Slaves by Burned Up Bled Dry (1998)
- a few possible selections for the soundtrack of your life by Chomsky (band) (1999)
- Understand This Is a Dream by The Juliana Theory (1999; Slide Guitar)
- Massacre by Ho-Hum (1999)
- Liberate Te Ex Inferis by Zao (1999)
- Flesh & Blood by No Innocent Victim (1999)
- The Crazy Engler Brothers by No Innocent Victim (1999)
- Rituals of Life by Stretch Arm Strong (1999)
- Regeneration of Self by Few Left Standing (1999)
- Private Conflicts and Suicides by Society's Finest (2000)
- The Narrow Scope of Things by Embodyment (2000; Keyboards)
- The Journey...So Far by Society's Finest (2000)
- The Hammering Process by Living Sacrifice (2000)
- Enter the Danger Brigade by Calibretto 13 (2000)
- Emotion Is Dead by The Juliana Theory (2000)
- Wormwood by Few Left Standing (2001)
- Self-Titled by Zao (2001; Bass)
- Onward Quirky Soldiers by Chomsky (2001)
- Music from Another Room by The Juliana Theory (2001)
- Hold Your Breath by Embodyment (2001)
- Eso-Charis by Eso-Charis (2001)
- Squad Five-O by Squad Five-O (2002)
- Songs for the Living by Embodyment (2002)
- Parade of Chaos by Zao (2002)
- Gravitate by Chomsky (2002)
- Four Wall Blackmail by Dead Poetic (2002)
- Everything I Touch Falls to Pieces by Dead to Fall (2002)
- Conceived in Fire by Living Sacrifice (2002); Guitar)
- This is Solid State, Vol. 4 by Various (2003)
- Bloodstain Pattern Analysis by Silence the Epilogue (2003)
- Live 10.13.2001 by The Juliana Theory (2003)
- Immune by Soul Embraced (2003)
- Love, Murder, and a Three Letter Word by Society's Finest (2004)
- Legendary by Zao (2004)
- Burning Bridges by Haste the Day (2004)
- In Memoriam by Living Sacrifice (2005)
- Written in Red by Two Summers Ago (2005)
- On Tomorrow by The Big Cats (2007)
- The Finest by Dead Poetic (2007)
- Tracing Phone Lines by The Radio Sky (2008)
- Dead Alive by Soul Embraced (2008)
- Concerning the Way It Was by Haste the Day (2010)
- The Infinite Order by Living Sacrifice (2010)
- The 2nd Era by Zao (2011)
- The Best of the Best by Haste the Day (2012)
- In the Clutches of the Novae by Mothwind (2014)
