= Edgefest (Dallas) =

Alternative-rock music festival in Dallas

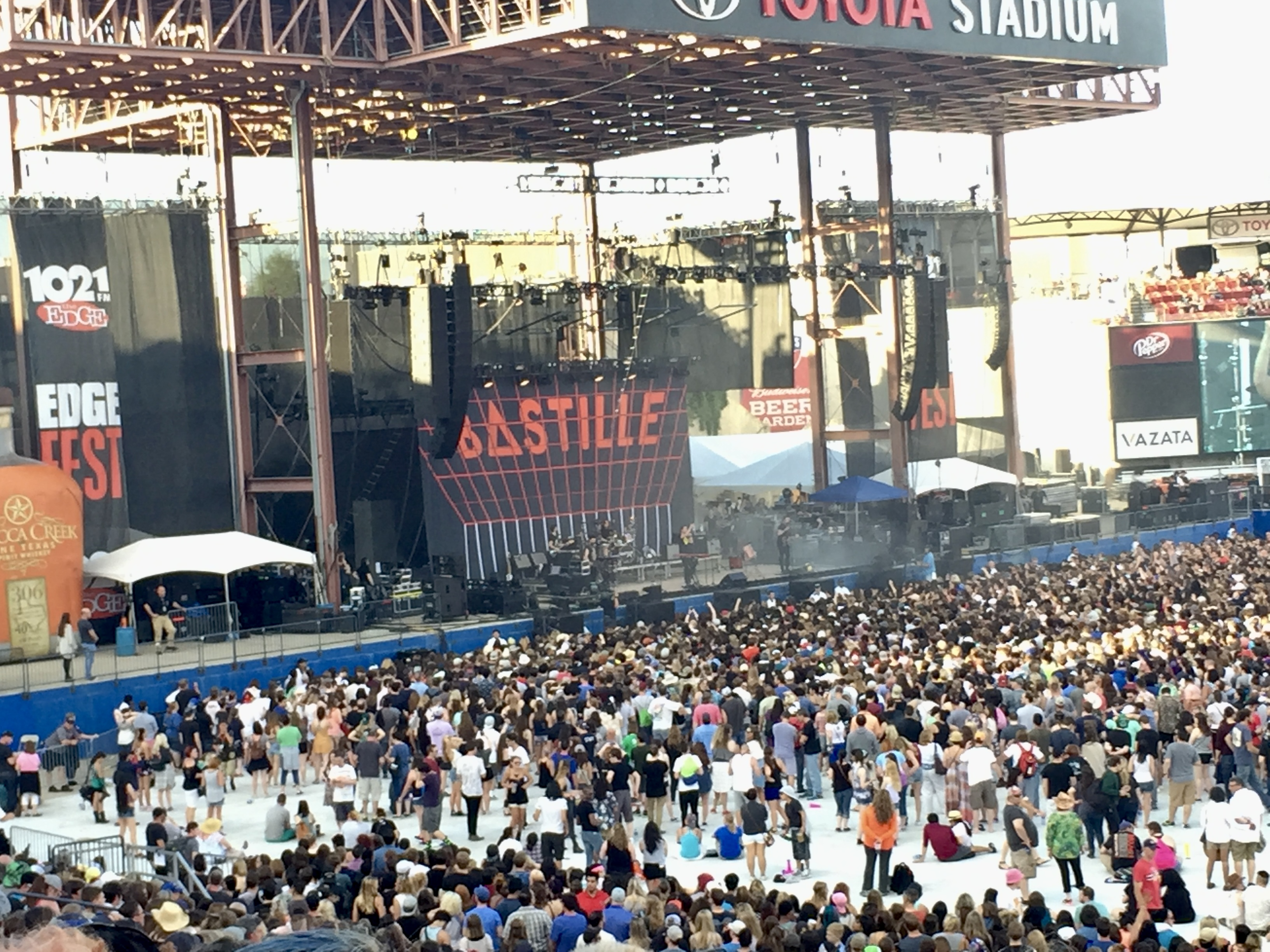
- Edgefest 2016 main stage
- Genre: Rock, alternative-rock
- Dates: 1992 to 2017
- Locations: Dallas, Arlington, and Frisco, Texas
- Organiser: KDGE 102.1 FM

Edgefest was an annual alternative-rock music festival concert held in and around Dallas, Texas from 1992 to 2017.

== Edgefest history and lineups ==
Edgefest was held annually from 1992 (#1) to 2017 (#27), except in 2008 when it was held twice (#17 and #18). The event was primarily held in the spring (April, May, and June) except 2004 (August 7) and the fall event in 2008 (October 25). Edgefest was held primarily at two venues throughout its history. The first was the outdoor amphitheater at Fair Park in Dallas, Texas (named Coca-Cola Starplex Amphitheatre, Starplex Amphitheatre and Smirnoff Music Centre) from 1992 to 1997, and 1999 to 2005. The second primary venue was Toyota Stadium, the home soccer stadium for FC Dallas soccer club in Frisco, Texas (previously known as Pizza Hut Park and FC Dallas Stadium), from 2006 to 2017. The one exception to the two primary venues during its history was Edgefest #7 in 1998 when it was held at The Ballpark in Arlington in Arlington, Texas, home of the Texas Rangers baseball team.

=== Edgefest #1 (1992) ===
Date: April 19, 1992

Venue: Coca-Cola Starplex Amphitheatre, Dallas, Texas (now known as the Dos Equis Pavilion)

Lineup: Pearl Jam, The Origin, The Sugarcubes, Charlatans UK, Dramarama, Psychefunkapus.

=== Edgefest #2 (1993) (billed as Edge Earth Day Concert) ===
Date: April 18, 1993

Venue: Coca-Cola Starplex Amphitheatre, Dallas, Texas

Lineup: Gumball, Dinosaur Jr., Pop Poppins, Tragically Hip, Gene Loves Jezebel, Belly, DADA, 808 State, Jellyfish

=== Edgefest #3 (1994) ===
Date: April 17, 1994

Venue: Coca-Cola Starplex Amphitheatre, Dallas, Texas

Lineup: Violent Femmes, Crash Test Dummies, The Indians, Eve's Plum, Possum Dixon, Dig, Material Issue, Crowded House, Tripping Daisy & Charlatans UK

=== Edgefest #4 (1995) ===
Date: April 23, 1995

Venue: Coca-Cola Starplex Amphitheatre, Dallas, Texas

Lineup: Adam Ant, Letters to Cleo, Veruca Salt, Blues Traveler, Sponge, Deep Blue Something, The Nixons, Hagfish, POL, Gravity Kills, Stabbing Westward

=== Edgefest #5 (1996) ===
Date: April 21, 1996

Venue: Coca-Cola Starplex Amphitheatre, Dallas, Texas

Lineup: The Verve Pipe, Poe, Dog's Eye View, Stabbing Westward, Gravity Kills, The Nixons, Ruby, Lush, The Refreshments, Modern English

=== Edgefest #6 (1997) ===
Date: April 20, 1997

Venue: Coca-Cola Starplex Amphitheatre, Dallas, Texas

Lineup: INXS, Beck, Matchbox 20, Moby, Ben Folds Five, K's Choice, Cake, Cowboy Mouth, Vallejo, Garbage

=== Edgefest #7 (1998) ===
Date: May 17, 1998

Venue: The Ballpark in Arlington, Arlington, Texas

Lineup: Creed, Fuel, Crystal Method, Everclear, Mighty Mighty Bosstones, Brother Cane, God Lives Underwater, Econoline Crush, Bobgoblin, Days of the New, Our Lady Peace, K's Choice

=== Edgefest #8 (1999) ===
Date: April 24, 1999

Venue: Starplex Amphitheatre, Dallas, Texas

Lineup: Collective Soul, The Goo Goo Dolls, Toadies, Marvelous 3, Eve 6, Dovetail Joint, The Nixons, Blink 182, Lit, Stabbing Westward, Local H, Tin Star, Sponge

=== Edgefest #9 (2000) ===
Date: April 29, 2000

Venue: Starplex Amphitheatre, Dallas, Texas

Lineup: 311, Everclear, Mighty Mighty Bosstones, The Nixons, Splender, Oleander, Dynamite Hack, Bowling For Soup, Stir, Dollybraid

=== Edgefest #10 (2001) ===
Date: May 12, 2001

Venue: Smirnoff Music Centre, Dallas, Texas

Lineup: Weezer, The Cult, Lifehouse, Fuel, Dexter Freebish, Everlast, Oleander, Orgy

=== Edgefest #11 (2002) ===
Date: June 1, 2002

Venue: Smirnoff Music Centre, Dallas, Texas

Lineup: Nickelback, Jerry Cantrell (of Alice In Chains), Default, Papa Roach, Trik Turner, Unwritten Law, Lit, Course of Nature, Goldfinger, Zac Malloy

=== Edgefest #12 (2003) ===
Date: May 17, 2003

Venue: Smirnoff Music Centre, Dallas, Texas

Lineup: New Found Glory, Good Charlotte, MxPx, Evanescence, Riddlin Kids, Seether, Maroon 5, All-American Rejects, the Fags, Socialburn, Blue October, South FM, Rocket Summer

=== Edgefest #13 (2004) ===
Date: August 7, 2004

Venue: Smirnoff Music Centre, Dallas, Texas

Lineup: Evanescence, Seether, Finger Eleven, Three Days Grace, Saliva, Breaking Benjamin, Lit, Blue October, Burning Brides, The Vanished

=== Edgefest #14 (2005) ===
Date: April 24, 2005

Venue: Smirnoff Music Centre, Dallas, Texas

Lineup: Jimmy Eat World, Sum 41, Chevelle, Billy Idol, Papa Roach, Breaking Benjamin, Crossfade, Alter Bridge, Unwritten Law

=== Edgefest #15 (2006) ===
Date: June 18, 2006

Venue: Pizza Hut Park, Frisco, Texas

Lineup: Staind, Trapt, Shinedown, Three Days Grace, 10 Years, Evan's Blue, Flyleaf, Hoobastank, Hawthorne Heights, Seether, Blue October, Buckcherry, Nonpoint, Drowning Pool, Revelation Theory, 30 Seconds to Mars, Atreyu, The Toadies

=== Edgefest #16 (2007) ===
Date: April 15, 2007

Venue: Pizza Hut Park, Frisco, Texas

Lineup: Killers, My Chemical Romance, A.F.I., Muse, Blue October, Jet, Papa Roach, Bowling for Soup, Red Jumpsuit Apparatus, Kaiser Chiefs, Sparta, Saosin, Bullet for My Valentine, Say Anything, Placebo, Finger 11, Ataris

=== Edgefest #17 (2008) ===
Date: April 27, 2008

Venue: Pizza Hut Park, Frisco, Texas

Lineup: 3 Doors Down, My Chemical Romance, Blue October, Seether, Story of the Year, Fair to Midland, Puddle of Mudd, Atreyu, Theory of a Deadman, 10 Years, Chevelle, Billy Talent, Finger Eleven, Sick Puppies, Red, Filter, Drive By, Revelation Theory, Miser, Drive A, Play Radio Play!, Spoonfed Tribe

=== Edgefest #18 (Fall 2008) ===
Date: October 25, 2008

Venue: Pizza Hut Park, Frisco, Texas

Lineup: Stone Temple Pilots, The Offspring, Staind, Toadies, Rise Against, Papa Roach, Seether, Alkaline Trio, Saving Abel, Gaslight Anthem, Drive A

=== Edgefest #19 (2009) ===
Date: May 9, 2009

Venue: Pizza Hut Park, Frisco, Texas

Lineup: Korn, 311, Blue October, Papa Roach, Shinedown, Taking Back Sunday, The Used, Red Jumpsuit, 10 Years, Drive A, Electric Touch, Anberlin, Framing Hanley, Aranda, Veer Union

=== Edgefest #20 (2010) ===
Date: May 1, 2010

Venue: Pizza Hut Park, Frisco, Texas

Lineup: Limp Bizkit, Three Days Grace, 30 Seconds to Mars, Deftones, Flyleaf, Switchfoot, Hole, 10 Years, Phoenix, Metric, Cage the Elephant, Violent Soho, Crash Kings, Neon Trees, Two Door Cinema Club, Unfathom, Ishi

=== Edgefest #21 (2011) ===
Date: April 30, 2011

Venue: Pizza Hut Park, Frisco, Texas

Lineup: Jane's Addiction, Weezer, Social Distortion, Seether, Neon Trees, A Day to Remember, The Airborne Toxic Event, Electric Touch, Young the Giant, Panic at The Disco, Flogging Molly, Dirty Heads, Middle Class Rut, New Politics, AWOLNATION, DYNAMITE WALLS, North of Autumn

=== Edgefest #22 (2012) ===
Date: April 22, 2012

Venue: FC Dallas Stadium, Frisco, Texas

Lineup: The Black Keys, Garbage, Evanescence, Cake, Cage the Elephant, Blue October, Arctic Monkeys, The Ting Tings, Neon Trees, Civil Twilight, Foxy Shazam, Switchfoot, Dead Sara, Aranda, The Features, Chomsky

=== Edgefest #23 (2013) ===
Date: April 27, 2013

Venue: FC Dallas Stadium, Frisco, Texas

Lineup: Phoenix, Bush, Deftones, Paramore, A Day To Remember, AWOLNATION, The Gaslight Anthem, The Airborne Toxic Event, Twenty One Pilots, Fitz & The Tantrums, Robert DeLong, Atlas Genius, The Neighbourhood, Capital Cities, The Mowgli's, Youngblood Hawke, Falling In Reverse, Kitten, A Silent Film, IAMDYNAMITE

=== Edgefest #24 (2014) ===
Date: April 26, 2014

Venue: Toyota Stadium, Frisco, Texas

Lineup: Beck, The Avett Brothers, Cage The Elephant, Bastille, Grouplove, New Politics, The Neighbourhood, Switchfoot, Chvrches, Ms Mr, J. Roddy Walston and the Business, Kongos, Bear Hands, Smallpools

=== Edgefest #25 (2015) ===
Date: April 25, 2015

Venue: Toyota Stadium, Frisco, Texas

Lineup: The Offspring, Death Cab for Cutie, Modest Mouse, AWOLNATION, New Politics, Banks, Hozier, Yelawolf, Dirty Heads, Vance Joy, Joywave, The Kooks, Robert DeLong, Andrew McMahon, Girl Talk, Marquis de Vaudeville, Hour Band

=== Edgefest #26 (2016) ===
Date: April 30, 2016

Venue: Toyota Stadium, Frisco, Texas

Lineup: Cage the Elephant, Good Charlotte, The 1975, Blue October, Bastille, X Ambassadors, Silversun Pickups, Chvrches, Nothing But Thieves, Foals, The Struts, The Strumbellas, The Joy Formidable, JR JR, The Unlikely Candidates

=== Edgefest #27 (2017) ===
Date: April 1, 2017

Venue: Toyota Stadium, Frisco, Texas

Lineup: Blink 182, The Offspring, 311, Chevelle, The Toadies, The Naked and Famous, The Nixons, Lit, Goodbye June, Black Pistol Fire, Dreamers, Missio, Badflower, The Wrecks
