= All Else Failed =

All Else Failed may refer to the following albums by Zao:

- All Else Failed (1995 album)
- All Else Failed (2003 album)
