= Hold Your Breath =

Hold Your Breath may refer to:

- Hold Your Breath (album), an album by Embodyment
- Hold Your Breath (1924 film), an American silent comedy film
- Hold Your Breath (2012 film), an American supernatural horror film
- Hold Your Breath (2024 film), an American psychological horror-thriller film
- "Hold Your Breath" (song), a song by A Loss for Words
