= Jesse Smith (musician) =

American musician

- Origin: Parkersburg, West Virginia, U.S.
- Genres: Christian metal, metalcore, Christian rock
- Occupation: Musician
- Years active: 1993–present
- Labels: Solid State, Tooth & Nail Records
- Website: Jesse Smith & the Holy Ghosts on Facebook

Jesse Smith is an American musician, best known for his work as the original drummer of metalcore band Zao. After leaving Zao, he has had multiple other bands/projects, including Gods, My Own Halo, Jesse Smith & the Holy Ghost, and Serpent Servant Slave.

== History ==
In 1993, Jesse Smith was recruited by friends Roy Goudy, Mic Cox and Eric Reeder to play drums in their newly formed band, which later was named Zao. In 1995, Zao recorded their first album, All Else Failed, with new singer Shawn Jonas (who would later form Symphony in Peril).

In 1997, The Splinter Shards the Birth of Separation was released with the line-up of Roy Goudy, Mic Cox and Shawn Jonas. In 1997, all of the band members except for Smith quit Zao following the 1997 Cornerstone festival and a couple of shows they played on the way back home..

In 1998, Smith recruited guitarist Brett Detar (who would later form The Juliana Theory), guitarist Russ Cogdell and vocalist Daniel Weyandt. Where Blood and Fire Bring Rest and Training for Utopia / Zao split EP were recorded with this line-up before Detar left to start The Juliana Theory.

Detar was replaced by Scott Mellinger and Smith's friend Rob Horner joined on bass guitar. This line-up recorded Liberate Te Ex Inferis in 1999, which in latin means "save yourself from hell". Cogdell left for a period of time in which Zao recorded Self-Titled in 2001.

In 2001, Zao "broke up" on stage but later reunited in 2002 to record Parade of Chaos and a reissue of All Else Failed. In 2004, it was announced Jesse Smith, along with Rob Horner, left the band.

Jesse Smith and Rob Horner started Gods along with former Zao bassist Kevin Moran. Gods' debut, I See You Through Glass, was produced by Barry Poynter and released in 2005. The band later disbanded in on June 6, 2006.

Before starting JS & THG, Smith joined Society's Finest in 2007. Though, in a podcast interview, Smith stated that he was never in that band. Smith later formed a live band project called Jesse Smith & the Holy Ghost. It has no official members other than Smith himself.

Over the years, Smith hired other musicians and had over time become an official band. The band has a full-length self-titled album to be released in 2016.

== Bands ==
Current

- Serpent Servant Slave – (2020)
- Jesse Smith & the Holy Ghost – vocals, guitars (2004–2019)

Former

- ZAO – drums (1993–2004)
- My Own Halo – vocals, all instruments (2007)
- Gods – vocals, guitar (2004–2006)
- Left Out – drums (1995–1996)
- Through the Eyes of Katelyn – vocals, all instruments (1999–2003)

Touring

- The Underwater – drums (2002–2004)

== Selected discography ==
ZAO

- All Else Failed (1995; Steadfast)
- The Splinter Shards the Birth of Separation (1997; Solid State)
- Where Blood and Fire Bring Rest (1998; Solid State)
- Liberate Te Ex Inferis (1999; Solid State)
- Self-Titled (2001; Solid State)
- Parade of Chaos (2002; Solid State)
- All Else Failed (2003; Solid State)
- Legendary (2003 Compilation; Solid State)

Through the Eyes of Katelyn

- Your Role Model's Dead (1999)

Gods

- I See You Through the Glass (2005; Hand of Hope)

Jesse Smith & the Holy Ghost

- Jesse Smith & the Holy Ghost (2016)

Serpent Servant Slave

- Headless (2020)

Production

- Throwing Myself by Luti-Kriss (2000; Solid State; Producer)
- The Dead Next Door by Spitfire (1999; Solid State; Producer)
