= The Journey...So Far =

Studio album by Society's Finest
- Released: August 15, 2000
- Recorded: 2000
- Genre: Metalcore
- Length: 34:11
- Label: Solid State
- Producer: Barry Poynter, Society's Finest

Society's Finest chronology
Private Conflicts & Suicides (2000)	The Journey...So Far (2000)	Love, Murder, and a Three Letter Word (2004)

Professional ratings
Review scores
Source	Rating
Cross Rhythms	8/10
Sputnik Music	2.8/5 stars

The Journey...So Far is the debut album of metalcore band, Society's Finest. This is the only production to feature any of the original members, other than vocalist Josh Ashworth.

== Critical reception ==
Chris Gramlich of Exclaim! writes "Still, while The Journey So Far is an adequate starting point for this quintet, whose roster includes former Embodyment screamer Josh Ashworth, their next musical endeavour must take them farther than The Journey... if they wish to rise above second tier status. (Solid State)"

== Artwork ==
The cover art, according to Jarrod Norris of Deadself Records, the picture was him, with a paper bag on his head, guitarist Kris McCaddon took the picture at Bassist Joel Bailey's house.

== Track listing ==
No.	Title	Length
1.	"1955"	2:48
2.	"6 Seconds Left Until Daylight"	3:35
3.	"Lucky 13"	2:08
4.	"Kiss the Girls"	3:55
5.	"Knife Fight"	5:30
6.	"Monarch"	2:16
7.	"7 Years of Momentum"	3:46
8.	"Martial Reality"	3:09
9.	"Following the Robertsons"	3:43
10.	"Dead People"	3:18

== Personnel ==
Society's Finest

- Joel Bailey – bass, vocals
- Rob Pruett – guitar, vocals
- Joshua Ashworth – vocals
- Kris McCaddon – guitar
- Chad Wilburn – drums

Additional musicians

- Josh Burnett – drums

Production

- Ramón Bretón – mastering
- Brandon Ebel – executive producer
- Jason Magnusson – assistant engineer
- Barry Poynter – engineer, mixing, producer
- Jarrod Norris – model
