= Embrace the Eternal =

Studio album by Embodyment
- Released: 1998
- Recorded: 1998
- Genres: Deathcore, metalcore
- Length: 44:16
- Label: Solid State
- Producers: Barry Poynter, Embodyment

Embodyment chronology
Embrace the Eternal (1998)	The Narrow Scope of Things (2000)

Professional ratings
Review scores
Source	Rating
Phantom Tollbooth	3.5/5 stars

Embrace the Eternal is the debut album by the Christian metal band, Embodyment. Coming three years after their primarily death metal demos, the album blends their original death metal style with metalcore sounds. The lyrics speak to their Christian beliefs, focusing on Christ's Crucifixion, Christian troubles and doubts in faith. It has been widely seen as the first ever deathcore release.

== Track listing ==
No.	Title	Length
1.	"20 Tongues"	5:08
2.	"Breed"	5:06
3.	"Swine"	4:00
4.	"Blinded"	4:16
5.	"Religious Infamy" (Feat Bruce Fitzhugh of Living Sacrifice)	5:03
6.	"Strength"	4:20
7.	"Golgotha"	5:32
8.	"Carnival Chair"	4:35
9.	"Embrace"	4:43
10.	"Rm 144"	1:33
Total length:		44:16

== Personnel ==
Adapted from AllMusic.

Embodyment

- Kris McCaddon – Vocals
- Mark Garza – Drums
- Andrew Godwin – Lead Guitar, Lyrics
- James Lanigan – Rhythm Guitar
- Kevin Donnini – Bass

Additional Musicians

- Bruce Fitzhugh – Guest Vocals on track 5

Production

- Barry Poynter – Engineer, Mixing, Recording
- Brian Grundman – Mastering
- Jason Parker – Art Direction, Concept, Layout, Photography
- Brandon Ebel – Executive Producer
