= Embodyment =

American Christian band

- Also known as: Supplication
- Origin: Arlington, Texas, U.S.
- Genres: Alternative rock; alternative metal; post-hardcore; nu metal; deathcore (early); death metal (early)
- Years active: 1992–2004
- Labels: Solid State, XS, One Day Savior
- Past members: Kris McCaddon; Sean Corbray; Andrew Godwin; Joshua Johnson; Mark Garza; Jason Lindquist; Derrick Wadsworth; Kevin Donnini; James Lanigan; Taylor Smith

Embodyment was a Christian rock band from Arlington, Texas. The group formed in 1992, were known as Supplication, and played death metal. The band changed style for its debut album, Embrace the Eternal, credited as one of the earliest deathcore releases. Following their debut full-length, the band abandoned extreme metal and pursued an alternative rock/nu metal style with their album The Narrow Scope of Things. They became lighter with each subsequent album.

The band performed shows with touring acts such as Living Sacrifice, Zao, Training for Utopia, P.O.D. and No Innocent Victim.

== History ==
Embodyment started as a death metal band called Supplication, with lead guitarist Andrew Godwin, singer Jason Lindquist, bassist Kevin Donnini, and drummer Jason Donnini. Domini quit the band and ran away from home. Lindquist knew Mark Garza from school and asked him to play drums. Garza joined the band on the condition that his friend, Taylor Smith, joined on rhythm guitars and vocals. After recording their debut demo, Persistent Sin, the band renamed to Embodyment. Smith left the band and singer Kris McCaddon joined.

The band played with bands such as Living Sacrifice, P.O.D., No Innocent Victim, Zao, and Focal Point. The band recorded and released their second demo, Corrosion of the Flesh. A self-titled demo was released soon after. Jason Stinson of Overcome showed Brandon Ebel of Tooth & Nail Records the band's demo, which led to their signing.

They signed to Solid State Records in 1997 for their debut album, Embrace the Eternal, where they switched to deathcore. The album contains mostly new material but also new versions of a couple of the old demos. Solid State later distributed a collection of the early Embodyment death metal demos titled [1993-1996] in addition to releasing a previously unreleased track by the band called “Halo of Winter” on the label's compilation album, “This Is Solid State Vol. I”.

After firing McCaddon, Sean Corbray joined the band and introduced a different vocal style, evidenced on the followup to Embrace the Eternal, titled The Narrow Scope of Things. This album was the band's first step away from heavier metal subgenres. They adjusted their sound to alternative metal with hard rock influences, and featured actual singing and some screamed vocal parts rather than death metal vocals.

Embodyment's third and final album for Solid State, Hold Your Breath, continued in the direction heard on The Narrow Scope of Things toward alternative and hard rock. Hold Your Breath was Embodyment's first album without screamed vocals, only singing vocals. Embodyment's last album, Songs for the Living, was much the same, showing less metal influence than Hold Your Breath.

Embodyment had shopped the Songs for the Living material around as an Industry Demo, looking for a new label, but after finding being given the idea that there was more interest than there was, they released it as an album on XS Records. The label was being operated by former Puller vocalist Mike Lewis and Living Sacrifice guitarist and vocalist Bruce Fitzhugh, who the band had much involvement with in their earlier years. Around this time, Garza departed from the band, as he needed to stay home rather than continue to go out on tour. Embodyment disbanded in early 2004 after having partially written a follow-up record. According to Godwin, the band was becoming burnt out on the constant touring and even the musical style at the time.

Andrew Godwin, Mark Garza, and Kris McCaddon, most of the lineup of the original Embodyment, have since formed The Famine, a band that returns to the members' metal roots. Godwin would also go on to perform in Pyrithion and his own solo project Hope Deferred. Garza would go on to work in Constant Seas, Lhoist, and recently joining Living Sacrifice as a live member for their 30th anniversary.

In February 2011, the band released a five-song EP, Forgotten, consisting of un-released songs from the Songs for the Living era.

== Members ==
Final lineup

- Sean Corbray – vocals (1999–2004)
- Derrick Wadsworth – bass (2000) rhythm guitar (2000–2002), drums (2003–2004)
- Jason Lindquist – vocals (1992–1994), rhythm guitar (1994–1997, 1999–2000), bass (2000–2004) (Hope Deferred)
- Andrew Godwin – lead guitar (1992–2004), rhythm guitar (2003–2004) (ex-The Famine, Pyrithion, Hope Deferred)

Previous members

- Kris McCaddon – vocals (1994–1999) (ex-The Famine, ex-Demon Hunter, ex-Society's Finest)
- Taylor Smith – rhythm guitar, vocals (1992–1994)
- James Lanigan – rhythm guitar (1997–1999)
- Kevin Donnini – bass, backing vocals (1992–1998)
- Mark Garza – drums (1992–2003) (ex-The Famine, Lhoist, Constant Seas)

Timeline

== Discography ==
Studio albums

- Embrace the Eternal (1998, Solid State, Reviews:HM Magazine, The Phantom Tollbooth)
- [1993-1996] (1999, Independent)
- The Narrow Scope of Things (2000, Solid State, Reviews: The Phantom Tollbooth)
- Hold Your Breath (2001, Solid State, Reviews: Jesus Freak Hideout)
- Songs for the Living (2002, XS Records, Reviews: Jesus Freak Hideout)
- Forgotten EP (2011, Reviews: Jesus Freak Hideout)

Demos

- Persistent Sin (tape under the band name "SUPPLICATION") - 1993
- Corrosion Of The Flesh - 1994
- Embodyment (3-song demo) - 1996
- Industry Demo (an early version of Songs for the Living) - 2002

Non-album tracks

- "Halo of Winter" from This is Solid State Vol. 1 (1998)
- "Breaking News", "And Then Some", "Spilling Over", "The Answer", and "Hindsight", all released online in 2003 and 2004 as parts of what would have been Embodyment's fifth full-length record.
- As of 2011, these five never-before-released songs have been officially released on Apple iTunes and Amazon.com, under the album title "Forgotten".
