= Songs for the Living =

Studio album by Embodyment
- Released: October 8, 2002
- Recorded: 2002
- Genre: Alternative rock
- Label: XS Records

Embodyment chronology
Hold Your Breath (2001)	Songs for the Living (2002)	Forgotten EP (2011)

Professional ratings
Review scores
Source	Rating
AllMusic	2.5/5 stars
Jesus Freak Hideout	3.5/5 stars

Songs for the Living is the fourth and final album by the Christian rock band Embodyment. This album continues in the direction of the band's lighter sound, and is the biggest departure from the band's extreme metal roots, and contains prominent indie rock influences.

== Critical reception ==
Andy Kelly of Jesus Freak Hideout wrote "Overall, Songs for the Living is a very solid release that takes Embodyment in incredible new directions, including great vocals and melodies that will be stuck in your head for weeks to come.", while Kevin Gordon of AllMusic wrote "Embodyment's Songs for The Living makes a convincing pitch for mainstream success."

== Track listing ==
No.	Title	Length
1.	"Reaching Out"	4:08
2.	"She's There"	4:01
3.	"Golden Rule"	3:42
4.	"Time"	3:22
5.	"Who's to Blame"	4:24
6.	"Don't Go"	3:46
7.	"Segue Station"	3:09
8.	"It's Alright"	3:50
9.	"White Flag"	4:38
10.	"Jaywalk"	3:41

== Credits ==
Embodyment

- Sean Corbray - Vocals
- Andrew Godwin - Lead Guitar
- Derrick "Stone" Wadsworth - Rhythm Guitar
- Jason Lindquist - Bass
- Mark Garza - Drums

Production

- Barry Poynter - Recording
- Edward Phillips - Executive Producer
- Michael Lewis - Executive Producer
- Roger E. Bishara - Legal Representation
- Jason Magnussen - Recording
- Mr. Colson - Mixing
- Scott Hull - Mastering
- Bruce Fitzhugh - A&R
- Kris McCaddon - Photography, Design
