= All Else Failed (1995 album) =

Studio album by Zao
- Released: September 1, 1995
- Recorded: 1995
- Studio: Poynter's Palace, Little Rock, Arkansas
- Genre: Hardcore punk, metalcore
- Length: 49:20
- Label: Steadfast
- Producer: Myk Porter, Barry Poynter

Zao studio album chronology
All Else Failed (1995)	The Splinter Shards the Birth of Separation (1997)

Professional ratings
Review scores
Source	Rating
AllMusic	(not rated)
Jesus Freak Hideout	2.5/5 stars

All Else Failed is the debut studio album by American metalcore band Zao. The album was later re-recorded and released as the identically titled All Else Failed in 2003.

This album on Steadfast Records has had three pressings in total, with different cover art for each pressing:

- 1st press: 1996 (green artwork)
- 2nd press: 1999 (brown artwork)
- 3rd press: 2000 (black artwork)

The album was again re-released in 2018, through Steadfast Records, with new artwork and was remixed and remastered.

== Critical reception ==
While not many reviews of their debut album were published, a select few are available.

Jesusfreakhideout.com's Steven Powless published a review of the album, giving it 2.5 stars out of 5. Despite his low-hung review, Powless states "Moreover, heart, I think, is really the driving force behind All Else Failed; it's the engine that makes it go. The raw emotion bleeding through every track rivals Where Blood and Fire Bring Rest in its intensity and makes this musically-somewhat-subpar effort much more satisfying than it could have been without it."

== Track listing ==
All tracks are written by Jesse Smith, except where noted.

No.	Title	Writer(s)	Length
1.	"Resistance"	Zao	2:50
2.	"In Loving Kindness"	Zao	3:31
3.	"Endure"	Zao	4:57
4.	"Growing in Grace" (feat. Myk Porter)		4:33
5.	"Foresight"		2:53
6.	"P.S. 77"		4:55
7.	"Exchange"	Zao	3:09
8.	"In These Times of Silence"		4:51
9.	"A Simple Reminder"		5:14
10.	"All Else Failed" (hidden track starts at 9:19)		12:27
Total length:			49:20

== Credits ==
Zao

- Shawn Jonas - Vocals
- Roy Goudy - Guitar
- Mic Cox - Bass
- Jesse Smith - Drums

Production

- Myk Porter - Producer
- Barry Poynter - Producer
- Ben Schigel - Engineer, Mixing, Mastering
- Keith Konya - Design, Layout
- Matt Traxler - Executive Producer, Photography
- Steve Wayne - Photography
- Danielle - Photography
