= Dos Equis Pavilion =

Amphitheatre located in Dallas, Texas

Coordinates: 32°46′31″N 96°45′23″W

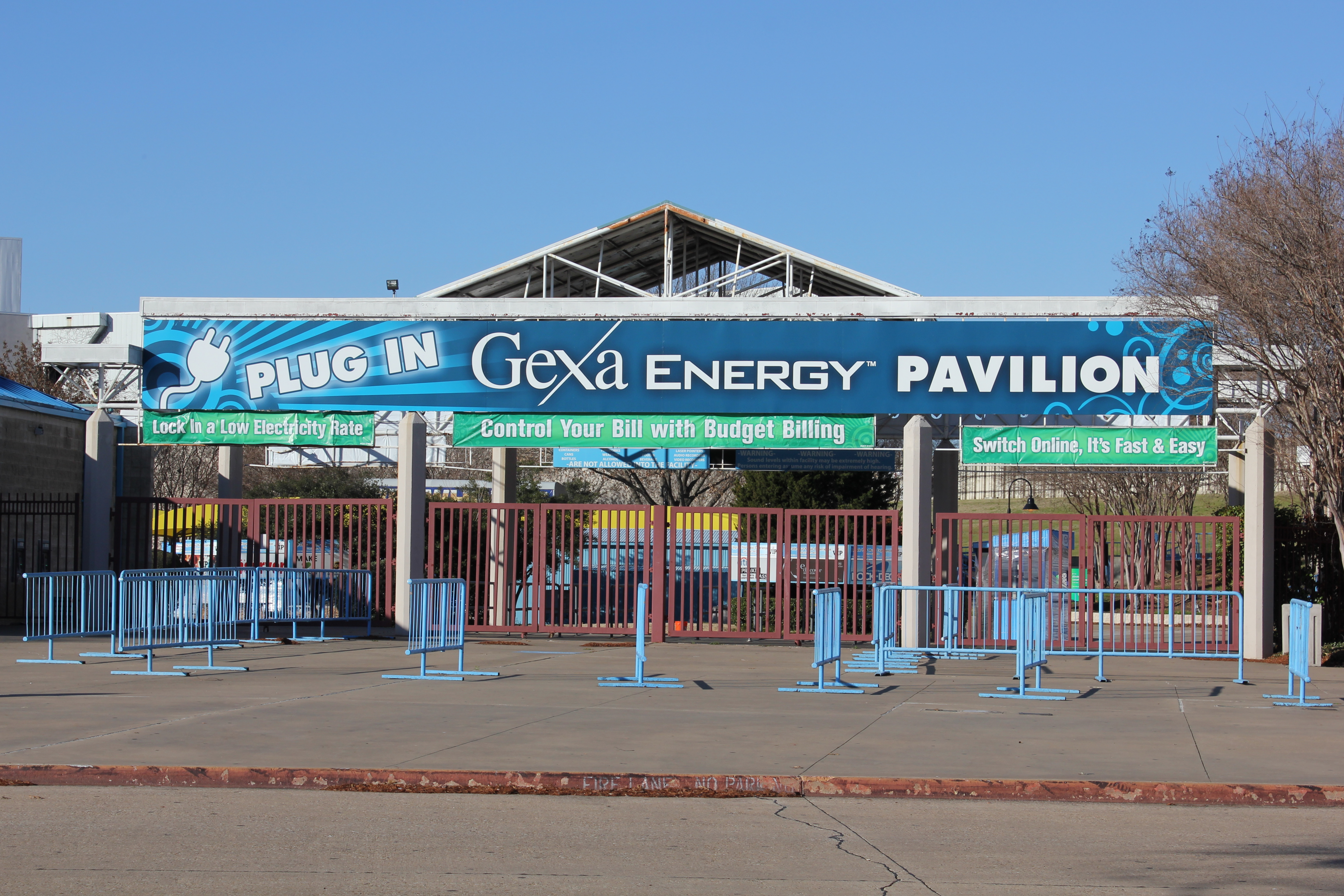
- Entrance to the venue (c.2012)
- Interactive map of Dos Equis Pavilion
- Former names: The Amphitheatre at Fair Park (planning/construction); Coca-Cola Starplex Amphitheatre (1988–98); Starplex Amphitheatre (1999); Smirnoff Music Centre (2000–08); Superpages.com Center (2008–11); Gexa Energy Pavilion (2011–16); Starplex Pavilion (2017–18)
- Address: 3839 S Fitzhugh Ave; Dallas, TX 75201
- Location: Fair Park
- Owner: City of Dallas
- Operator: Live Nation
- Capacity: 20,000

Construction
- Groundbreaking: August 18, 1987
- Opened: July 23, 1988
- Cost: $10 million ($28.3 million in 2025 dollars)

The Dos Equis Pavilion (originally Coca-Cola Starplex Amphitheatre) is an outdoor amphitheatre located in Fair Park, Dallas, Texas.

== Naming history ==
The venue opened as Coca-Cola Starplex Amphitheatre on July 23, 1988, with a concert by Rod Stewart. The outdoor covered amphitheater featured 7,500 seats under a pavilion and 12,500 general admission lawn seats. After Coca-Cola's naming rights expired in 1998, the venue was known simply as Starplex Amphitheatre.

In 2000, naming rights were sold to the Smirnoff vodka company, as a result of a corporate sponsorship agreement with House of Blues. The center was then called Smirnoff Music Centre and The Music Centre at Fair Park (for concerts featuring underage performers).

The name changed again in January 2008 to Superpages.com Center when naming rights were awarded to Superpages.com.

The name has changed several times since then: to Gexa Energy Pavilion in 2011, Starplex Pavilion in 2017. and Dos Equis Pavilion in April 2018.

== Performers ==
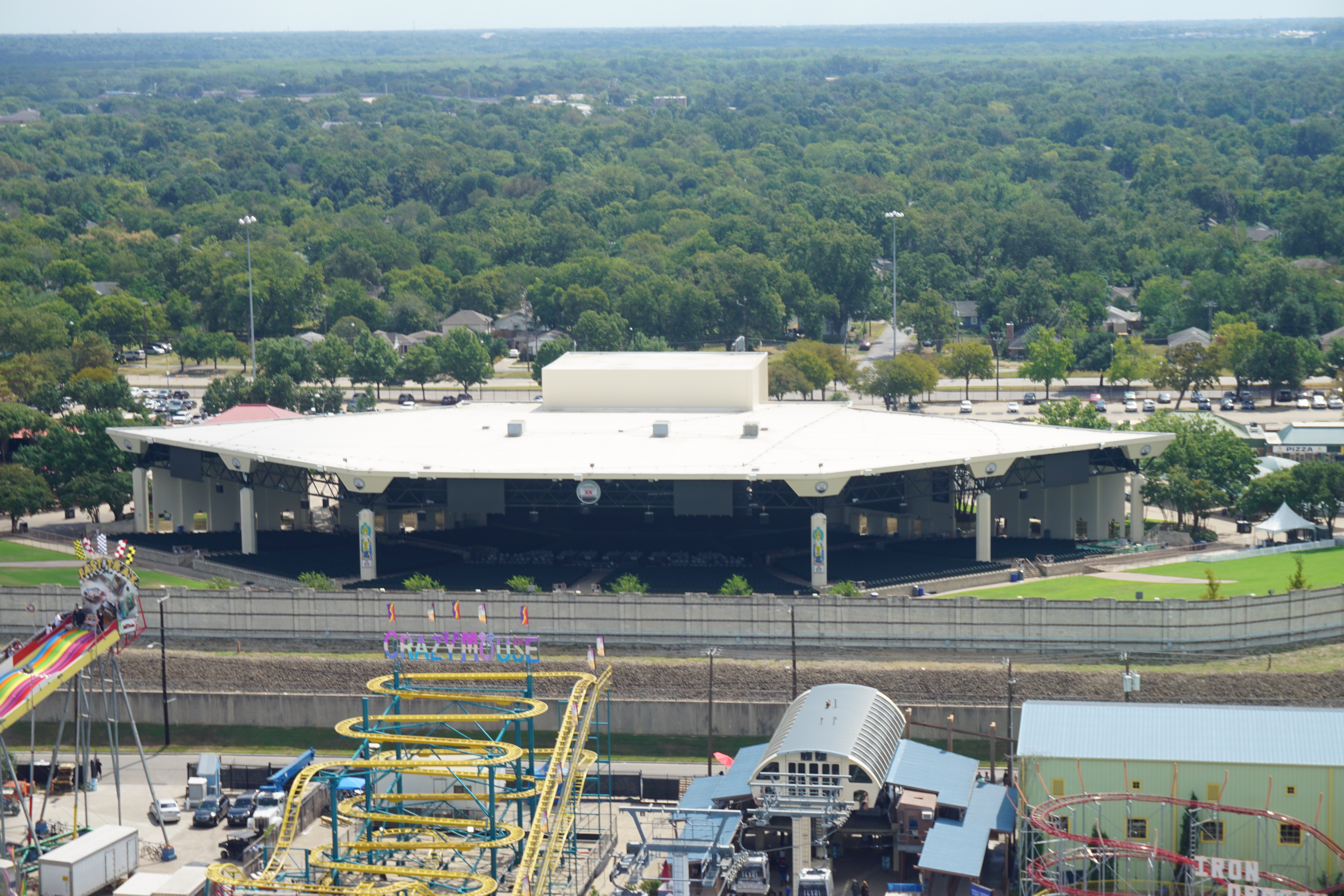
Dos Equis Pavilion as viewed from Texas Star

Coca-Cola Starplex Amphitheatre opened the weekend of July 23–24, 1988 with Rod Stewart on Friday night, followed the next evening with a double bill of Aerosmith and Guns N' Roses. Bob Dylan, Hall & Oates, AC/DC, Steve Winwood, Kenny Loggins, Huey Lewis, Def Leppard, Willie Nelson and Bruce Hornsby all played the Starplex just in the first month. Before the season ended in October, Starplex hosted shows from Tangerine Dream, James Taylor, Eric Clapton, The Moody Blues, Chicago, Elton John, Robert Plant, and Santana. The fall Starplex concert schedule coincided with the State Fair of Texas, also held in Fair Park each October.

Rod Stewart returned on April 21, 1989, to kick off the second concert season at Starplex. The bookings at Starplex were eclectic and played heavily to classic-rock and nostalgia acts. Tom Petty, Jimmy Buffett, Bon Jovi, Jackson Browne, Chris Isaak, Allman Brothers Band, The Beach Boys, Peter, Paul and Mary, The Monkees, Little Feat, Don Henley, Jefferson Airplane, Stevie Nicks, and Cher all played Starplex that summer and fall. Chicago, Elton John, and Bob Dylan each returned. The promoters also experimented with jazz offerings like Spyro Gyra and Miles Davis, and booked popular pop acts like Tiffany, New Kids On The Block, Milli Vanilli, and Paula Abdul.

Frank Sinatra opened the 1990 season at Starplex. New performers included Tears For Fears, Crosby, Stills, and Nash, Joe Cocker, Steve Miller Band, The Black Crowes, Wilson Phillips, Richard Marx, Ziggy Marley, Linda Ronstadt, The Neville Brothers, Heart, Bonnie Raitt, Bad Company, Phil Collins, and Billy Idol. David Bowie brought his Sound + Vision Tour to Starplex for a special Independence Day show on July 4, 1990. Miles Davis, Chicago, Santana, Jimmy Buffett, The Moody Blues, James Taylor, The Beach Boys, and Steve Winwood all returned.

=== Coca-Cola Starplex in the 1990s ===
In the 1990s, the offerings at Starplex gradually reflected the changing landscape of music being played on the radio. The focus began to shift away from classic-rock and nostalgia acts like Yes who played there in 1991, to more alternative rock popularized by 94.5 The Edge in the Dallas market. Alternative artists like Peter Murphy, The Church, Throwing Muses, New Order, The Replacements, The Cult, Shelleyan Orphan, The Cure, Edie Brickell & New Bohemians, Tracy Chapman, Depeche Mode, The B-52's, Faith No More, Alice In Chains, The The, Morrissey, Blind Melon, 10,000 Maniacs, Midnight Oil, Primal Scream, Meat Puppets, The Jayhawks, Sarah McLachlan, Live, The Cranberries, Radiohead, R.E.M., Nine Inch Nails, Indigo Girls, Luscious Jackson, Los Lobos, Tori Amos, The Afghan Whigs, all played Starplex.

Many popular radio acts of the day headlined Starplex in the 1990s including Tina Turner, Michael Bolton, Harry Connick Jr., Celine Dion, Lyle Lovett, Seal, Gloria Estefan, Hootie & the Blowfish, Alanis Morissette, Dave Matthews Band, Phish, The Wallflowers, Spice Girls, Better Than Ezra, and Garbage.

=== Alternative music festivals ===
==== Lollapalooza ====
Starplex was the site of the Lollapalooza festival tour cofounded by Perry Farrell from 1991 to 1995. The alternative music juggernaut would return each year to Starplex until 1997, when sales declined and the festival's tastemaking cache had faded. The various lineups included:

- August 22–23, 1991: Siouxsie and the Banshees, Jane's Addiction, Violent Femmes, Rollins Band, Living Colour, Nine Inch Nails, Body Count, and Butthole Surfers. The shows were notorious not only for record attendance for bands that were playing small clubs just a few months before, but also for the inclusion of gangsta rap pioneer Ice-T and his rap-metal outfit Body Count. Ticket sales were boosted both by the immense popularity of the headliners and by controversy surrounding Body Count's "Cop Killer," which was eventually removed from the group's debut album.
- September 6, 1992: Pearl Jam, Stone Temple Pilots, Red Hot Chili Peppers, Soundgarden, Ministry, Lush, The Jesus & Mary Chain, and Ice Cube.
- August 1, 1993: Sebadoh, Rage Against The Machine, Primus, Tool, Dinosaur Jr., Alice In Chains, and Arrested Development. The following weekend, the knockoff MTV Alternative Nation tour followed with a lineup including Spin Doctors, Soul Asylum, and Screaming Trees.
- August 20–21, 1994: The Smashing Pumpkins, Green Day, L7, A Tribe Called Quest, Beastie Boys, Stereolab, Nick Cave and the Bad Seeds, The Breeders, George Clinton and the P-Funk All-Stars, and The Flaming Lips. Ticket sales were strong for the 1994 festival despite the April death of Kurt Cobain, whose band Nirvana was originally set to headline the festival.
- August 10, 1995: Mike Watt, Versus, Sonic Youth, Pavement, Hole, Elastica, The Roots, Cypress Hill, Blonde Redhead and Beck.

In 1996 Lollapalooza was not presented at Starplex. On the date of the festival (July 25, 1996) Gloria Estefan had booked Starplex as part of a two-night engagement. The event was held at Old Fort Dallas in Ferris, TX with a lineup that included Metallica, Soundgarden, Ramones, Rancid, Screaming Trees, Cheap Trick, Steve Earle, Soul Coughing, Sponge, Melvins, and Jonny Polonsky.

- August 2, 1997: Devo, Jon Spencer Blues Explosion, Tool, James, Tricky and Snoop Dogg.
- August 8, 2003: Thirty Seconds To Mars, Incubus, Audioslave, The Donnas, Queens of the Stone Age and Jane's Addiction

==== Edgefest ====
On April 19, 1992 94.5 The Edge hosted their own alternative music festival with Edgefest 1992, a one-day festival which brought together The Charlatans, The Sugarcubes, Pearl Jam, and Dramarama. To ensure maximum attendance, general admission tickets to the festival were only $9.45. On July 27, 1992 The Edge presented the Edge Birthday Bash with a one-day lineup including Peter Murphy, Material Issue, Rollins Band, The Soup Dragons and Cracker.

In subsequent years Starplex would often open each season with an Edgefest event instead of seeking a major name headliner.

In 1993 The Edge temporarily dropped the Edgefest moniker and put together the Edge Earth Day Concert on April 18, 1993, featuring The Tragically Hip, Dinosaur Jr., Jellyfish, Belly, 808 State and others. In subsequent years Edgefest continued with these lineups:

- April 17, 1994: Violent Femmes, The Charlatans, Tripping Daisy, Possum Dixon, Crash Test Dummies, and Crowded House. Crash Test Dummies also opened for Elvis Costello and the Attractions the following weekend at Starplex.
- April 22, 1995: Veruca Salt, Sponge, Letters To Cleo, Blues Traveler, and Adam Ant
- April 21, 1996: Modern English, Lush, Poe, The Verve Pipe, and The Refreshments. On June 2, 1996, The Edge presented another Edge Birthday Bash with Jewel, Cowboy Junkies, Jars Of Clay and Deep Blue Something.
- April 20, 1997: Beck, Moby, Matchbox Twenty, INXS, Ben Folds Five, Cake, and Cowboy Mouth

In 1998 Edgefest was not presented at Starplex. On the date of the festival (May 17, 1998) Starplex was not booked for any event. The event was held at The Ballpark In Arlington with a lineup including Creed, Fuel, The Crystal Method, Everclear, Mighty Mighty Bosstones, and God Lives Underwater.

- April 24, 1999: Third Eye Blind, Blink-182, Toadies, Local H, Collective Soul, and Goo Goo Dolls
- April 29, 2000: The Mighty Mighty Bosstones, Everclear, Bowling For Soup, and 311
- May 12, 2001 (after venue was renamed Smirnoff Music Centre): Weezer, Fuel, Lifehouse, The Polyphonic Spree, and The Cult
- June 1, 2002: Nickelback, Papa Roach, Lit, Unwritten Law, Goldfinger and Chomsky (a smaller bill featuring Flickerstick and Bowling For Soup played an Edgefest "Pre-Party" show on May 31)
- May 17, 2003: Evanescence, Good Charlotte, MxPx, The All-American Rejects, New Found Glory and Maroon 5 (a smaller bill featuring Blue October and Socialburn played an Edgefest "Pre-Party" show on May 16)
- August 7, 2004: Evanescence, Three Days Grace, Seether, Breaking Benjamin and Lit. This was the first Edgefest presented in late summer, and followed Ozzfest 2004 by just two days.
- April 24, 2005: Sum 41, Papa Roach, Jimmy Eat World, and Billy Idol. The Edge also presented a Fall Homecoming event on October 23, 2005, with Thirty Seconds to Mars, Seether, Panic! At The Disco, Audioslave, and The All-American Rejects.

==== H.O.R.D.E. Tour ====
In 1995 the jam band-inspired H.O.R.D.E. (Horizons Of Rock Developing Everywhere) tour visited Texas for the first time at Starplex.

August 30, 1995: Wilco, Morphine, Blues Traveler, Ziggy Marley, and The Black Crowes

In 1996 the H.O.R.D.E. festival did not visit Starplex. On the date of the festival (July 19, 1996) Starplex was not booked for any event. The event was held at Texas Motorplex with a lineup that included Rusted Root, Lenny Kravitz, Leftover Salmon, Medeski, Martin & Wood, Dave Matthews Band and Blues Traveler.

In 1997 headliners Widespread Panic dropped out of the H.O.R.D.E. tour at the last minute and a planned Texas stop was cancelled. Two of the planned headliners (Beck and Ben Folds Five) had played Starplex at Edgefest already in May.

August 23, 1998: Cowboy Mouth, Cherry Poppin' Daddies, Barenaked Ladies, Fastball, Ben Harper and Blues Traveler

==== Lilith Fair ====
From 1997 to 1999 Sarah McLachlan brought Lilith Fair, her all-female alternative rock, folk and country festival to Starplex.

- August 4, 1997: Suzanne Vega, Joan Osborne, Natalie Merchant, Sarah McLachlan, Lisa Loeb, Jewel, Indigo Girls, Emmylou Harris, Sheryl Crow, Tracy Chapman, Paula Cole, Fiona Apple, The Cardigans, and Mary Chapin Carpenter
- August 1, 1998: Liz Phair, Lucinda Williams, Natalie Merchant, Sarah McLachlan, Bonnie Raitt and Erykah Badu
- July 21, 1999: Sarah McLachlan, Sheryl Crow, Shawn Colvin, Dido, and Luscious Jackson

=== Hard rock and classic rock artists ===
Throughout the 1990s hard rock and heavy metal artists continued to remain popular with AC/DC, Judas Priest, Cinderella, Poison, Lita Ford, Scorpions, Tesla, Kix, Great White, Metallica, White Lion, Warrant, Kiss, Aerosmith, Slayer, Megadeth, Anthrax, Slaughter, L.A. Guns, Skid Row, Guns N' Roses, Motörhead, Alice Cooper, Iron Maiden, Ozzy Osbourne, Extreme, Van Halen, Mötley Crüe, Pantera, Queensrÿche, Dokken, Danzig, Monster Magnet, and Dio all playing Starplex.

Classic rock acts including Yes, Joe Walsh, The Doobie Brothers, Lynyrd Skynyrd, John Mellencamp, Ringo Starr & His All-Starr Band, Emerson, Lake & Palmer, Dr. John, Glenn Frey, Sting, Leon Russell, Barry Manilow, Lenny Kravitz, Duran Duran, Tina Turner, Procol Harum, Jethro Tull, Neil Young, Traffic, Foreigner, America, Cheap Trick, Meat Loaf, Steely Dan, REO Speedwagon, Jeff Beck, Tina Turner, Cyndi Lauper, Rush, Blondie, Sammy Hagar, Fleetwood Mac, Boz Scaggs, Alan Parsons Live Project, John Fogerty, Journey, Paul Simon, Eddie Money, Peter Frampton and Roger Waters made appearances at Starplex in the 1990s.

Several prominent rock bands celebrated Independence Day at Starplex in the 1990s including Boston (July 4, 1995), a triple-bill of Blue Öyster Cult, Kansas, and Styx (July 4, 1996), Steve Miller Band (July 4, 1997) and a triple-bill of L.A. Guns, Warrant, and Slaughter (July 4, 1998).

=== Metal, hardcore, and thrash music festivals ===
==== Ozzfest ====
The enduring popularity of hard rock, heavy metal and industrial metal was not lost on the promoters behind Ozzfest, the annual festival created as a harder-edged alternative to Lollapalooza and which featured Ozzy Osbourne and/or Black Sabbath as headliners.

- June 1, 1997: Pantera, Powerman 5000, Type O Negative, Fear Factory, Ozzy Osbourne, and Black Sabbath. Just 10 days later, the competing R.O.A.R. (Revelation of Alternative Rhythms) tour also played Starplex with a lineup that included Sponge, Sevendust, Bloodhound Gang, and The Reverend Horton Heat on June 11.
- July 13, 1999: Rob Zombie, Slayer, System Of A Down, Slipknot, Primus, Godsmack, Fear Factory, Deftones, and Black Sabbath
- August 18, 2000 (after venue was renamed Smirnoff Music Centre): Pitchshifter, Pantera, Incubus, Godsmack, Disturbed and Ozzy Osbourne. Two weeks prior, the Tattoo The Earth festival had presented Slipknot, Sevendust, Slayer, Sepultura and Mudvayne on August 6.
- July 5, 2001: Taproot, Slipknot, Papa Roach, Mudvayne, Hatebreed, Disturbed, Marilyn Manson and Black Sabbath. Just a few days earlier the Big Freakin' Deal festival was presented on June 30 with a lineup of Puddle Of Mudd, Rammstein, Tesla, Staind, Toadies and others.
- September 8, 2002: Rob Zombie, System Of A Down, Andrew W.K., P.O.D., Neurotica, Hatebreed, Tommy Lee and Ozzy Osbourne
- June 29, 2003: Voivod, Nothingface, Korn, Disturbed, Marilyn Manson and Ozzy Osbourne
- August 5, 2004: Slayer, Throwdown, Slipknot, Hatebreed, Judas Priest and Black Sabbath
- August 25, 2005: Mastodon, Rob Zombie, Velvet Revolver, Drowning Pool and Black Sabbath

In 2006 Ozzfest was not presented in Dallas. On July 11, 2006, Ozzfest played Verizon Wireless Amphitheater in Selma, TX with a lineup including System Of A Down, Avenged Sevenfold, Disturbed and Ozzy Osbourne.

- August 2, 2007: Lamb Of God, Static-X, Lordi, 3 Inches of Blood and Ozzy Osbourne

==== KEGL Freaker's Ball ====
- October 13, 1996: Ozzy Osbourne, Danzig, Sepultura, and Biohazard
- October 30, 1999: Slipknot, Coal Chamber, Sevendust, Machine Head, and Megadeth
- October 31, 2002: Korn, Disturbed, Blindside and TRUSTCompany
- October 31, 2003: Sevendust, Staind, Jibe and Marilyn Manson
- October 24, 2004: Velvet Revolver, Switchfoot, Breaking Benjamin, The Donnas and The Used

=== Country artists ===
Country music superstars were a regular feature at Starplex, with several artists booking return engagements throughout the 1990s. Willie Nelson, Reba McEntire, George Strait, Steve Earle, Hank Williams Jr., Clint Black, Alabama, Dolly Parton, Brooks & Dunn and Dwight Yoakam were among the many country acts to regularly appear at Starplex in the 1990s. More recently, the Pavilion has welcomed acts like Thomas Rhett, Rascal Flatts, Florida Georgia Line, Dierks Bentley, Miranda Lambert and Chris Young.

=== Soul, R&B, hip-hop and rap ===
Starplex hosted a number of R&B and soul superstars in the 1980s and 1990s including Earth, Wind & Fire, Sade, B.B. King, The Temptations, Al Jarreau, Wynton Marsalis, George Benson, Whitney Houston, Buddy Guy, Janet Jackson, Anita Baker, Rick James, and Boyz II Men. The venue was slow to embrace hip-hop and rap acts except as part of festival bills: Tone Loc played Starplex on August 3, 1989, as part of the Club MTV package tour that also included Milli Vanilli, Lisa Lisa and Cult Jam, and Paula Abdul. Gangsta rap, rap-rock and rap-metal acts including Ice-T, Ice Cube, Body Count, Cypress Hill, and Snoop Dogg were booked at Starplex as part of the annual Lollapalooza tour which also featured alternative rock bands.

Gradually hip-hop and rap acts began to get booked as headliners beginning with the groundbreaking Fugees show on July 26, 1996. The next summer, on July 19, 1997, the House of Blues Smokin' Groovies tour brought together The Roots, Outkast, Cypress Hill, George Clinton and the P-Funk All-Stars, and Erykah Badu on a single bill.

Prince brought his Jam Of The Year tour to Starplex on August 9, 1997. The singer, backed by an all-new New Power Generation band, played a fast and loose set that included James Brown, Madhouse and Joan Osborne covers amid hits like "Little Red Corvette" and deep cuts like "The Cross" and "Strange Relationship."

=== Smirnoff Music Centre 2000–2008 ===
After the naming rights to Starplex were sold to Smirnoff vodka in mid-2000, the venue dropped the Starplex moniker and was renamed Smirnoff Music Centre. The venue was sometimes billed as The Music Centre at Fair Park for all-ages shows which could not, for legal reasons, be sponsored by a producer or distributor of alcoholic beverages.

Many of the biggest music acts of the 2000s played Smirnoff Music Centre in the 2000s including Britney Spears, Destiny's Child, Mary J. Blige, Aaron Carter, Dashboard Confessional, Pink, No Doubt, Kelly Clarkson, John Mayer, Counting Crows, 3 Doors Down, Linkin Park, Norah Jones, Oasis, Coldplay, Wu-Tang Clan and Colbie Caillat; indie heroes Queens Of The Stone Age, Bettie Serveert, The Smithereens, Weezer, Rilo Kiley and TV on the Radio; and country legends Toby Keith, Kenny Chesney, Alan Jackson, Shooter Jennings, Drive-By Truckers, Old 97's, and Blake Shelton. Brian Wilson, Deep Purple, Joe Satriani, David Lee Roth, ZZ Top, J.J. Cale, Night Ranger, Peter Gabriel, Quiet Riot, Annie Lennox, Michael McDonald, Loverboy and Rick Springfield were among the classic-rock superstars making their debut at the venue in the 2000s.

Package tours remained popular with the Power To The People tour bringing a quadruple bill of Poison, Slaughter, Dokken and Cinderella. The Up In Smoke tour brought rappers Warren G, Ice Cube, Dr. Dre and Eminem together on August 7, 2000.

On June 16, 2001, the Summer Jam festival was held featuring rap stars Ludacris, Lil' Mo, Ja Rule, Bow Wow and Ginuwine. The Extreme Steel event on July 14, 2001, combined Slayer, Pantera, Static-X and other metal acts. The Back To School tour brought together Puddle Of Mudd, Godsmack, and Deftones a week later. The Volunteers For America tour on October 20, 2001, featured a star-crusted lineup of Styx, Survivor, REO Speedwagon, Journey, Kansas and Eddie Money joining forces to raise funds for the victims of the 9/11 terror attacks just one month later.

On July 18, 2002, the Jeep World Outside festival brought Tonic, Train, O.A.R., Ziggy Marley and Sheryl Crow on July 18, 2002. The Sprite Liquid Mix tour included an eclectic bill of Hoobastank, N*E*R*D, 311 and Jay-Z. A double bill of Incubus and Phantom Planet played an Independence Day show on July 4, 2002.

Big Freakin' Deal returned May 8, 2003 with Systematic, Powerman 5000 and Godsmack. On August 14, 2004, the Curiousa Festival brought Interpol, Mogwai, The Rapture and The Cure together on a single ticket. On July 15, 2005, the Sounds of the Underground festival assembled Lamb Of God, Throwdown, Clutch, High On Fire and Gwar. The Family Values tour brought Korn, Deftones, Flyleaf and Stone Sour together on August 5, 2006. On June 19, 2007, the Honda Civic Tour was presented with Fall Out Boy, Paul Wall, Cobra Starship and others. On August 2, 2007, the Projekt Revolution tour came to Smirnoff with Linkin Park, My Chemical Romance, Taking Back Sunday, HIM, and Placebo. Family Values returned August 17, 2007 with Korn, Evanescence, Flyleaf and Neurosonic.

==== Vans Warped Tour ====
Vans Warped Tour, with an emphasis on punk, pop-punk and ska artists and skater culture, visited Smirnoff (and later Superpages.com Center) annually starting in 2000.

- August 4, 2000: NOFX, Save Ferris, MxPx, The Mghty Mighty Bosstones, Long Beach Dub Allstars, Less Than Jake and The Ataris
- July 20, 2001: Sum 41, Rancid, The Vandals, Less Than Jake, Kool Keith, Good Charlotte, AFI and 311
- June 28, 2002: Reel Big Fish, No Use For A Name, Thrice, NOFX, MxPx, Lagwagon, Good Charlotte, Bad Religion and The Used
- July 19, 2003: The Used, Thrice, The Suicide Machines, Andrew W.K., Rancid, Plain White T's, AFI, Dropkick Murphys, Simple Plan and Less Than Jake
- June 26, 2004: New Found Glory, My Chemical Romance, Thursday, Ima Robot and Bad Religion
- June 24, 2005: The Offspring, My Chemical Romance, MxPx, No Use for A Name, Dropkick Murphys, Avenged Sevenfold, and The All-American Rejects
- July 1, 2006: NOFX, Paramore, Less Than Jake, Helmet, I Am Ghost and Silverstein
- July 14, 2007: Paramore, New Found Glory, Coheed and Cambria, All Time Low and Bad Religion
- July 3, 2008 (after venue was renamed Superpages.com Center): Reel Big Fish, Relient K, Say Anything, Paramore, Against Me! and Katy Perry
- July 5, 2009: Less Than Jake, Underoath, Bad Religion, and A Day To Remember
- July 3, 2010: Sum 41, Suicide Silence, Pierce The Veil, Alkaline Trio, and The All-American Rejects

=== Superpages.com Center 2008–2010 ===
At the opening of the 2008 season the naming rights for Smirnoff Music Centre expired and the venue was renamed for Superpages.com, an online business directory based in Coppell, Texas. The British spelling of the word "Centre" was changed to the more common American "Center" at the same time. The Heart Of The City package tour with Mary J. Blige, The-Dream and Jay-Z was the first engagement at Superpages.com Center on April 12, 2008. The Glow In The Dark tour with Kanye West, Rihanna, N*E*R*D and Lupe Fiasco followed weeks later on May 1, 2008. The True Colors tour assembled Cyndi Lauper, Joan Jett, The B-52's and others on a single bill June 22, 2008. 97.5 The Eagle presented a BFD festival on July 24, 2008, with Mötley Crüe, Papa Roach, Buckcherry and others. Mayhem Festival rolled into Superpages the next day with a bill including Disturbed, Slipknot, Underoath, Mastodon, Machine Head and other Ozzfest alumni. The Eagle brought another BFD festival to Superpages August 8, 2009 with Mötley Crüe, Godsmack and Drowning Pool. Mayhem Festival also returned August 15, 2009 with Marilyn Manson, Cannibal Corpse, Slayer and others. Mayhem returned August 13, 2010 with Rob Zombie, Korn, Hatebreed, Lamb of God and others. Uproar Festival followed September 10, 2010 with Disturbed, Avenged Sevenfold and others.

Avril Lavigne, Taylor Swift, Demi Lovato, Jonas Brothers, James Blunt, Brad Paisley, Chris Cornell, The Avett Brothers, Darius Rucker, Rascal Flatts, Jason Aldean, Lil Wayne, Tim McGraw, Lady Antebellum, Sublime, Jack Johnson, Owl City, and Kings Of Leon all made their debuts at Superpages.com during this period. The Police and Anthrax also played Superpages.com for the first time, though Police frontman Sting had headlined both Starplex and Smirnoff Music Centre as a solo artist.

=== Gexa Energy Pavilion 2011 - 2016 ===
Lana Del Rey

One Direction

=== Dos Equis Pavilion 2018 - Present ===
On April 21, 2018, the Foo Fighters played their first show in Dallas in over a decade at the Dos Equis Pavilion on their Concrete and Gold Tour. On June 2, 2023, Janet Jackson played to a sold-out crowd at the venue on her Together Again tour.

== Gallery ==
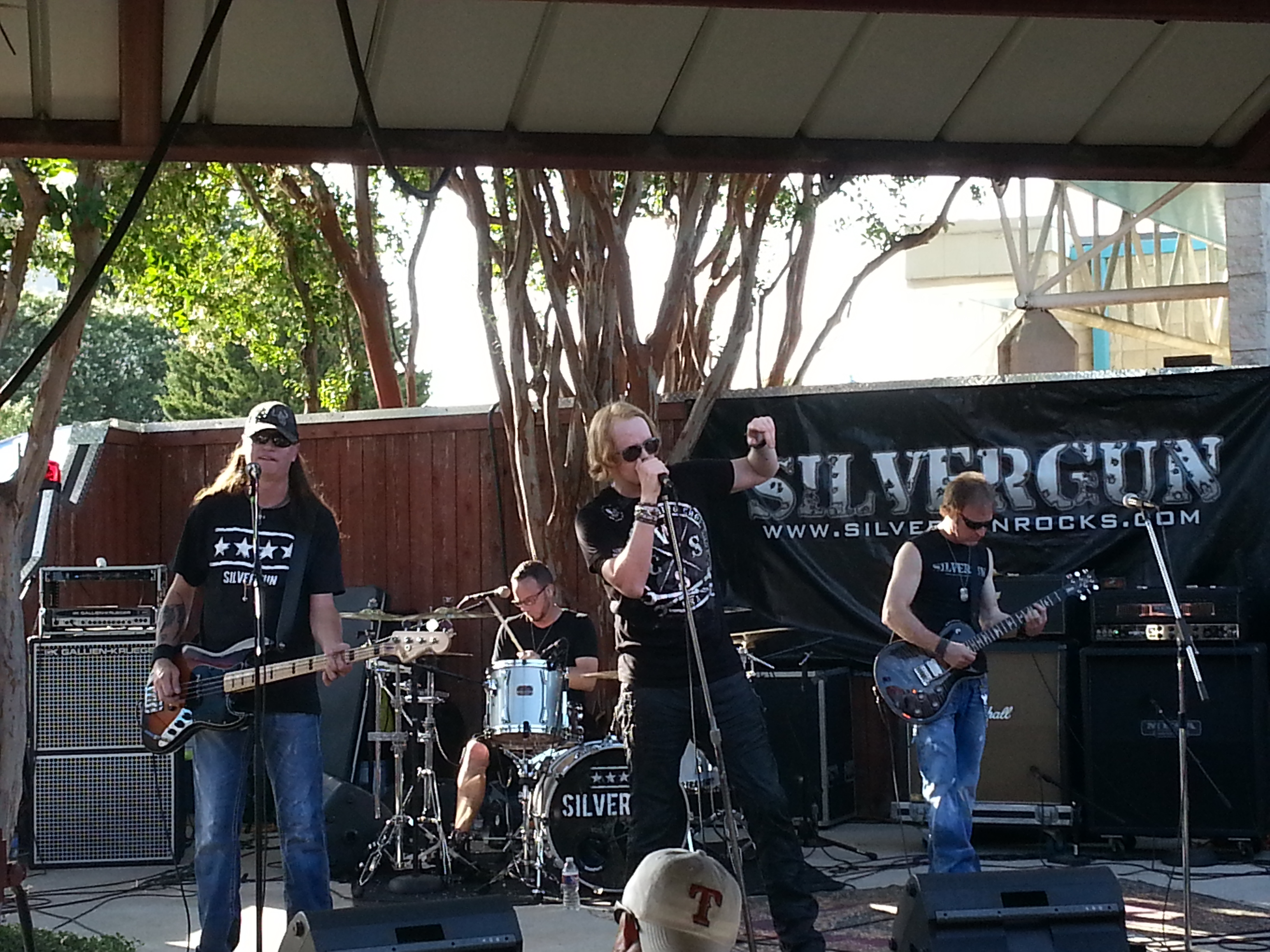
American rock band Silvergun from Dallas, Texas performing at Gexa Energy Pavilion

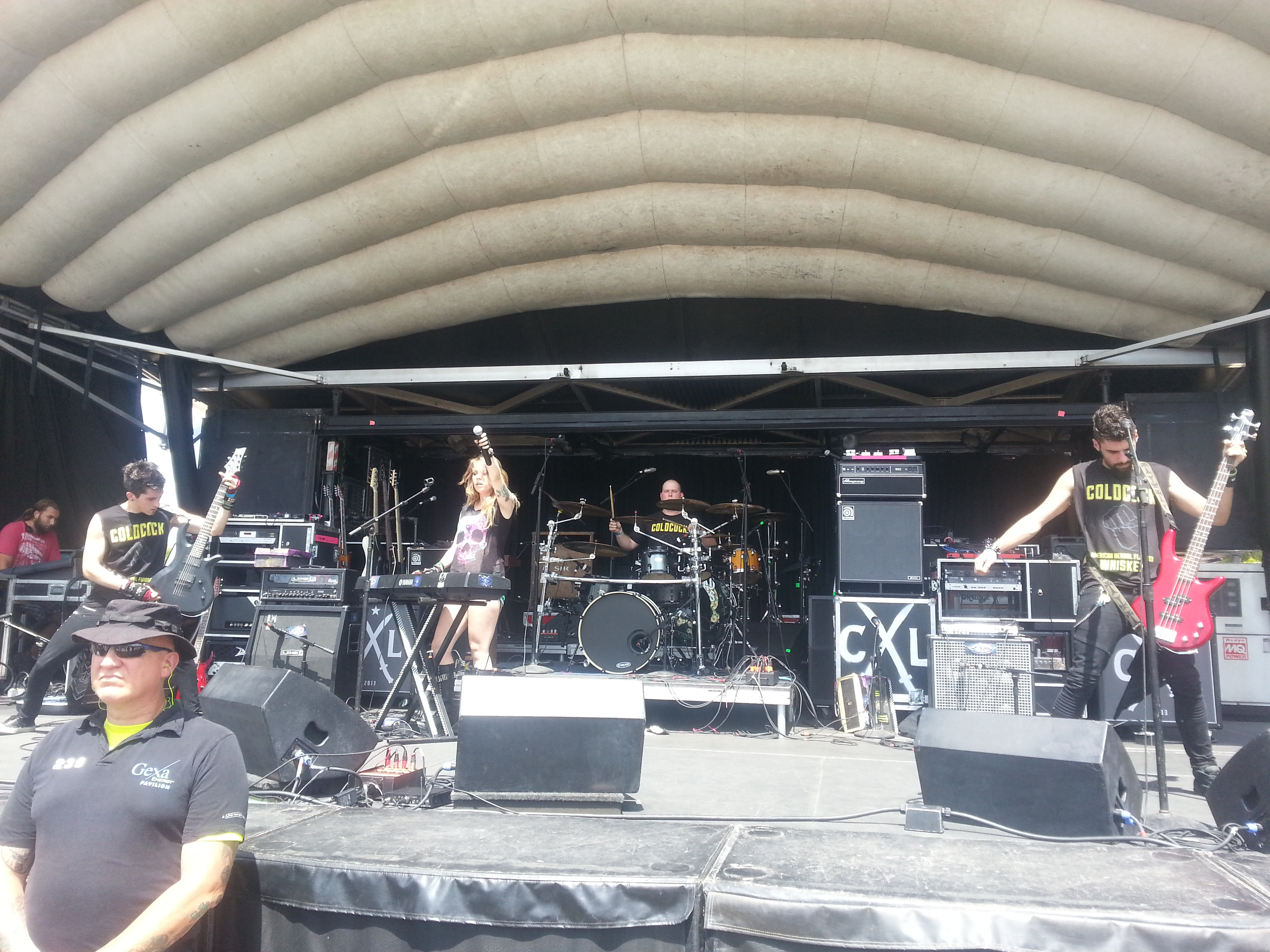
Arlington alternative rock band Solice performing for Uproar Festival at Gexa Energy Pavilion

== See also ==
- List of contemporary amphitheatres
- List of music venues
- Live Nation
