= Conelrad (band) =

American heavy metal band

- Origin: Pittsburgh, Pennsylvania; United States
- Genres: Metalcore, post-hardcore
- Years active: 2001–present
- Labels: New Addition Media, Lost Tundra, Hope, Hardtravelin, Oh No Vertigo
- Members: Jeff Gretz; Adam MacGregor

Conelrad was an American heavy metal duo from Pittsburgh, Pennsylvania. The group, consisting of Jeff Gretz (of From Autumn to Ashes and Zao) and Adam McGregor (formerly of Creation Is Crucifixion), formed in early 2001. They played at Mr. Roboto Project in 2003, and released a 7-inch record and a CD. In mid-2005, the duo went on a break. Sporadic activity since then has seen only two performances and the release of a 7-inch EP.

Their style has been described as a mixture of Carcass and Lightning Bolt, and features spoken word as well as shrieks; Pittsburgh Live referred to the band's music as "experimental lunacy".

== Members ==
- Jeff Gretz – drums, vocals
- Adam MacGregor – guitar, vocals

== Discography ==
=== Albums and EPs ===
- Bezoar (7-inch vinyl, Hope and Hardtravelin', April 2004)
- A Final Dissolution (CD, New Addition Media, September 2004)
- Torus Shock Trio Sessions with Steve Moore, alto sax (limited edition CD-R, Lost Tundra, September 2004)
- Sluts and Slobs (7-inch vinyl, Oh No Vertigo, September 2006)

=== Compilations ===
- The West Coast of the East Coast (CD, Hardtravelin' Records) – "Mania a Potu"
- Advanced Calculus – Live at 88.3 WRCT (CD, These Bricks Are Mine Records) – "Life Is a Hoax" (live)
- The Long Run of Small Steps (Cassette, Hardtravelin' Records) – "More of the Same"
- Unicorn Mountain Vol 1 (CD/book, Unicorn Mountain Records) – "Taepodong 2"
