= Creation Is Crucifixion =

American metalcore band

- Also known as: Chapter
- Origin: Pittsburgh, Pennsylvania, United States
- Genres: Metalcore, mathcore, noise music
- Years active: 1995–present (on hold)
- Labels: Willowtip, Hactivist Media, Robotic Empire
- Members: Paul Nowoczynski; Nathan Martin; Michael Laughlin; Chad Schlegel; Ryan Unks
- Past members: Scott Mellinger; Adam MacGregor; Mike Williams; Nathan Berlinguette; Todd Ladner; Karl Hlavinka
- Website: creationiscrucifixion.com

Creation Is Crucifixion is a mathcore band from Pittsburgh, Pennsylvania. The group originally formed under the name Chapter in 1995, but changed the name to Creation Is Crucifixion in 1997. The band was known for its complicated sound, which varied from ambient noise to more complex pieces. Their lyrical themes often dealt with technology and various functions of society, such as politics and religion.

The members of the band formed Hactivist Media in 2001 to release the recordings and experiments of the group. This signaled a step in the band's evolution as the group became increasingly political with the release of their Child as Audience CD in 2001, which featured a large booklet printed in multiple languages that theorized using technology as subversion (focusing on the reprogramming of children's video games). The band also experimented with various formats by releasing compositions on 3.5" discs through the organization.

Creation Is Crucifixion has been mostly inactive since 2002. There is a further release in the works via Robotic Empire, but the release has suffered numerous delays.

Former member, Scott Mellinger is a member of hardcore band Zao. Michael Laughlin was formerly the drummer of the deathgrind band Cattle Decapitation.

== Members ==
Current

- Paul Nowoczynski - guitar (1995-present)
- Nathan Martin - vocals (1995-present)
- Michael Laughlin - drums (1995-present; former member of Cattle Decapitation)
- Chad Schlegel - bass guitar
- Ryan Unks - guitar

Former

- Scott Mellinger - guitar (1995-1999; current member of Zao)
- Adam MacGregor - guitar (current member of Conelrad, Brown Angel and Microwaves)
- Mike Williams (Yellow Hair Strong) - bass guitar
- Nathan Berlinguette - bass guitar
- Todd Ladner - bass guitar
- Karl Hlavinka – guitar (Racetraitor and Kill the Slave Master)

== Discography ==
=== Singles ===
- Descent from Heaven 7-inch (2 song, self-released, 1998)
- Dethrone or Devour 7-inch (King of Monsters Records, 1998)
- split 7-inch with Suicide Nation (Cyberdine243 Records, 1999)
- split 7-inch with Fate of Icarus (Willowtip Records, 1999)
- split 7-inch with Unruh (Willowtip Records, 1999)
- split 7-inch with Suicide Nation (repress, Hactivist Media 2001)

=== EPs ===
- Automata 12-inch/ CD (Willowtip Records, 1999)
- Rerecording of the Vinyl Songs (Willowtip Records, 2000)
- Child as Audience CD (Hactivist Media, 2001)

=== Albums ===
- In_Silico CD (King of Monsters Records, 1998), LP (Cyberdine243 Records, 1998)
- In_Silico CD/LP (Repress, Scorched Earth Policy Records, 2000)

=== Odd Format Releases ===
- Floppy Noize Series Disk One 3.5" Floppy Disc (Hactivist Media, 2001)
- UUM Floppy Noize Series Disk Two 3.5" Floppy Disc (Hactivist Media, 2001)
- Kill Net Art 3" mini CD (Limited to 100 copies, Hactivist Media, 2001)
- UUM Laboratory Series 1 3" mini CD (Ltd to 100 copies, Hactivist Media, 2001)
- Destructivist CD (Hactivist Media, 2001)
- Radio Bronka CDr (Hactivist Media, 2002)
