= The Narrow Scope of Things =

Studio album by Embodyment
- Released: April 25, 2000
- Recorded: November 26–December 1999
- Genres: Alternative rock, post-hardcore, nu metal
- Length: 52:04
- Label: Solid State Records
- Producers: Barry Poynter, Jason Magnusson

Embodyment chronology
Embrace the Eternal (1998)	The Narrow Scope of Things (2000)	Hold Your Breath (2001)

The Narrow Scope of Things is the second album by the Christian rock band Embodyment. It is the first album not to feature original vocalist Kris McCaddon or rhythm guitarist James Lanigan. It is also the first to completely abandon the band's previous death metal influences, pursuing a more alternative rock style.

== Critical reception ==
Professional ratings
Review scores
Source	Rating
AllMusic	4/5 stars
The Phantom Tollbooth	4/5 stars
Cross Rhythms	9/10 Squares

Jason D. Taylor reports "Overall, The Narrow Scope of Things was the turning point for Embodyment, and as it stands is their best record as well." Michial Farmer of The Phantom Tollbooth wrote: "Other songs, such as Pendulum attempt (rather unsuccessfully, in my opinion) to combine the band's new softer edge with hardcore. In the end, though, if The Narrow Scope of Things is remembered for anything, it will be for the remarkable pop sensibilities and melodies crafted within." Alex Figgis of Cross Rhythms writes "If you are looking for some intelligently written and deftly executed art, then look no further than The Narrow Scope Of Things."

== Track listing ==
No.	Title	Length
1.	"Winter Kiss"	3:31
2.	"Pendulum"	3:39
3.	"One Less Addiction"	5:53
4.	"Greedy Hands"	5:27
5.	"Confessions"	4:28
6.	"Assembly Line Humans"	3:50
7.	"Prelude"	3:40
8.	"Killing the Me in Me"	3:57
9.	"Critical Error"	3:51
10.	"Ballad"	3:25
11.	"One Less Addiction [Acoustic]"	4:06
12.	"The Aftermath of Closure"	6:17
Total length:		52:04

== Personnel ==
Embodyment

- Sean Corbray - Vocals
- Andrew Godwin - Lead Guitar
- Jason Lindquist - Rhythm Guitar
- Derrick Wadsworth - Bass
- Mark Garza - Drums

Production

- Barry Poynter - Engineer, Producer, Keyboards
- Jason Magnusson - Assistant Engineer, Additional Percussion, Backing Vocals, Producer
- David Johnson - Photography
- Don Clark - Art Direction, Layout Design
- Brandon Ebel - Executive Producer
