= All Else Failed (2003 album) =

Studio album by Zao
- Released: February 19, 2003
- Recorded: 2002
- Studios: Poynter's Palace, Little Rock, Arkansas
- Genre: Metalcore
- Length: 41:36
- Labels: Solid State; Tooth & Nail; EMI
- Producers: Barry Poynter; Jason Magnusson

Zao chronology
Parade of Chaos (2002)	All Else Failed (2003)	Legendary (2003)

Professional ratings
Review scores
Source	Rating
Allmusic	(not rated)
Lambgoat	7/10

All Else Failed is a re-recorded album by American metalcore band Zao, released on February 19, 2003, by Solid State/Tooth & Nail/EMI. It features newly recorded versions of eight of ten tracks from their original debut album, All Else Failed (1995). The recording was done during the same session as Parade of Chaos.

== Track listing ==
No.	Title	Writer(s)	Length
1.	"Resistance"	Shawn Jonas, Roy Goudy, Mic Cox, Jesse Smith	2:59
2.	"In Loving Kindness"	Jonas, Goudy, Cox, Smith	3:14
3.	"Endure"	Jonas, Goudy, Cox, Smith	4:41
4.	"Growing in Grace"	Smith	5:18
5.	"Foresight"	Smith	2:59
6.	"Ps. 77"	Smith	5:26
7.	"Exchange"	Jonas, Goudy, Cox, Smith	3:25
8.	"All Else Failed"	Smith	13:34
Total length:			41:36

== Credits ==
- Daniel Weyandt – lead vocals
- Scott Mellinger – guitar, bass
- Jesse Smith – drums, vocals, guitar
