= Love, Murder, and a Three Letter Word =

Studio album by Society's Finest
- Released: August 24, 2004
- Recorded: 2004
- Genre: Metalcore, progressive metal, mathcore, heavy metal
- Length: 30:22
- Label: Hand Of Hope
- Producer: Braxton Henry

Society's Finest chronology
The Journey...So Far (2000)	Love, Murder, and a Three Letter Word (2004)	And I, the Drunkard (2006)

Professional ratings
Review scores
Source	Rating
AllMusic	3/5 stars
Sputnik Music	2.4/5 stars

Love, Murder, and a Three Letter Word is the second album of the metalcore band Society's Finest. The album consisted of two EPs put together, Private Conflicts and Suicides and the Texas EP.

== Critical reception ==
Mike from In Music We Trust writes: "Society's Finest play the kind of gripping, grueling metalcore that will leave you sweaty, spent, and most likely, really banged up. Nine tracks of unabashed bitterness is what you'll find here, complete with some harsh lyrics and a relentless need to whip things into frenzy. Such is the case on the taxing 'Ennis, TX' and the wicked riffages of 'Always a Bridesmaid, Never a Bride', breeding explosiveness whose volatility knows no bounds. If you're looking for some extreme music, the latest from Society's Finest will surely send you over the edge."

Edward Rivadavia from AllMusic writes: "Really two EPs spliced together -- its first four songs are brand new, while its final five were originally issued in 2000 as the Private Conflicts and Suicides EP -- Love, Murder and a Three Letter Word served to announce the resurrection (second or third at this stage) of Texas metalcore pretenders Society's Finest. An extremely competent ensemble still looking for a firm direction, the group seems to be wavering between the technically outrageous arrangements currently in vogue in the metal underground, and old-school hardcore's simpler charms. To wit, songs like "Vanity and the Gun" and "Ennis, TX" clearly flirt (rather unconvincingly, one should note) with the fringes of math metal mayhem; and it's more straightforward, groove-built numbers like "Pop Culture in Houston" and "The Art...the Morgue" that find the band most at ease. Neither one of these styles is the dominant as you move into that original 2000 EP's final five tracks; these take a slower, dirge-metal approach with their riffs, which while perhaps not as explosive or exciting, definitely find a better balance for it. Lacerated vocals punctuate hateful offerings like "A Cold Winter's Morning," "Eggshell," and "Zero-Nine-Three-Zero," as they finally bring some truth to the band's "So beautiful but filled with so much hate" motto. All of which suggests that, if they don't break up again, Society's Finest would do well to review the past in order to find their future."

David Stagg reported "When Society’s Finest's EP Love, Murder, and a Three Letter Word came out back in June of 2004, it was my honor to review it for this very magazine. The EP was a long time coming: Before that, Society’s Finest had put out two split CDs, an EP, and a full-length on Pluto Records, solidifying a fan base just before having to abruptly put it on hold in 2003 while singer Joshua Ashworth toured with Zao. When they reformed with the current line-up after that hiatus, that EP was already hotly anticipated. In the review, I mentioned that the band was obviously working some kinks out, but that if they got it together, the full-length would be stellar. And it is. They certainly got something together, put it in any number of torture devices, and then spit it out on the other side. It’s faster, more menacing, louder. The CD drops immediately into the barrage of metal, like jumping off a cliff where you don’t hit bottom until the end of the CD. The first two tracks are solid, but for some reason – in a good way – leave the listener wanting more. Some builds don’t climax in a crazy breakdown as one would expect them to, but some would commend this. However, because it makes the first three tracks feel like an extended build, when one of the best breakdowns on the CD hits in the fourth track, “One More Kiss,” it gives you chills. Whatever it was that these Texas and California kids took before making this record needs to be shared among some of the discouraging metal clones in the world. Whether it was help from producer Andreas Magnusson (of Black Dahlia Murder, Scarlet, and Gods fame), or the time off that pushed them to the limit, you could barely ask for more from a reformed band's first full-length in years. Key tracks: “Cutters, Oh Cutters,” “One More Kiss.” [Hand of Hope] David Stagg"

== Track listing ==
No.	Title	Length
1.	"Vanity and the Gun" (A part of the Texas EP)	3:05
2.	"Pop Culture in Houston" (A part of the Texas EP)	2:55
3.	"Ennis, TX" (A part of the Texas EP)	2:45
4.	"The Art... The Morgue" (A part of the Texas EP)	2:46
5.	"Always a Bridesmaid, Never a Bride" (A part of Private Conflicts & Suicides)	3:41
6.	"A Cold Winters Mourning" (A part of Private Conflicts & Suicides)	4:44
7.	"Eggshell" (A part of Private Conflicts & Suicides)	3:25
8.	"Journeyman" (A part of Private Conflicts & Suicides)	3:32
9.	"Zero-Nine-Three-Zero" (A part of Private Conflicts & Suicides)	3:29

== Personnel ==
Society's Finest

- Joshua Ashworth – vocals
- Joel Bailey – bass
- Randall Watts – guitar (Texas EP)
- Nick Nowell – guitar (Texas EP)
- Derek – guitar (Private Conflicts & Suicides)
- Robb Pruett – guitar (Private Conflicts & Suicides)
- Stephen Poole – drums (Texas EP)
- Phil – drums (Private Conflicts & Suicides)

Production

- Christian Anthony – Photography
- Zech Bard – design
- Paul Geller – Remastering
- Braxton Henry – engineer, producer
- Barry Poynter – engineer
- Kent Stump – Mastering
