= Hold Your Breath (album) =

Studio album by Embodyment
- Released: October 9, 2001
- Recorded: 2001
- Genre: Alternative metal, alternative rock
- Label: Solid State, One Day Savior
- Producer: Barry Poynter, Jason Magnusson

Embodyment chronology
| The Narrow Scope of Things (2000) | Hold Your Breath (2001) | Songs for the Living (2002) |

Hold Your Breath is the third studio album by the American Christian metal band, Embodyment.

== Critical reception ==
Professional ratings
Review scores
| Source | Rating |
|---|---|
| AllMusic | 2/5 stars |
| Theprp | 4/5 |
| Cross Rhythms | 9/10 |
| Jesus Freak Hideout | 4/5 stars |

Jason Taylor of AllMusic says with Hold Your Breath, Embodyment directs "their sound toward passionate alternative rock", and compared to past releases, "Embodyment targets a much more mainstream version of heavy rock." However, he concludes that Hold Your Breath "is missing that extra something to claim it is an outstanding album" and "fails to meet expectations."

Wookubus of Theprp writes, "Gone are the screams and grating guitar work and in their place are twisting melodies and emphatic croons, bringing to mind the likes of a tougher version of Far, Jimmy Eat World or recent Cave In with an occasional prog-rock styled excursion." He claims "the material present here is perhaps the band's most mature offering to date." Hold Your Breath is "a worthy purchase for anyone looking for something a bit different from cookie cutter emocore or the mainstream norm."

Amber Authier or Exclaim! states, "drummer Mark Garza shines" but "vocalist Sean Corbray sounds like he is struggling to perform at the same level as the rest of his band-mates on some tracks".

Mark Broomhead of Cross Rhythms wrote "Hold Your Breath grabs you immediately as it kicks straight in with a riff slightly reminiscent of The Smashing Pumpkins." He compares Embodyment's sound on Hold Your Breath to Kings X's heavier side.

Blake Garris of Jesus Freak Hideout expressed Embodyment's "screaming seems like a thing of the past and melodic hardcore seems like the key to their bright future." He calls the lyrics "repetitive" but "very artistic".

== Track listing ==
| No. | Title | Length |
|---|---|---|
| 1. | "Yours Truly" | 3:31 |
| 2. | "Belly Up" | 3:32 |
| 3. | "Decade" | 4:24 |
| 4. | "K-9" | 3:11 |
| 5. | "Set the Stage" | 4:32 |
| 6. | "Heaven in a Letter Bomb" | 2:38 |
| 7. | "Season's End" | 3:38 |
| 8. | "Binge and Purge" | 2:52 |
| 9. | "Moving On" | 4:05 |
| 10. | "Cruise Control" | 3:50 |
| Total length: | | 36:13 |

== Personnel ==
Embodyment

- Sean Corbay – Vocals
- Andrew Godwin – Lead Guitars
- Derrick "Stone" Wadsworth – Rhythm Guitars
- Jason Lindquist – Bass
- Mark Garza – Drums

Production

- Brandon Ebel – Executive Producer
- Jason Magnusson – Executive Producer, Producer
- Barry Poynter – Producer
