= Self-Titled (Zao album) =

Studio album by Zao
- Released: February 27, 2001
- Recorded: September 10–23, 2000
- Studios: Poynter's Palace, Little Rock, Arkansas
- Genre: Metalcore
- Length: 36:08
- Labels: Solid State; Tooth & Nail; EMI
- Producers: Barry Poynter; Jesse Smith; Scott Mellinger

Zao studio album chronology
Liberate Te Ex Inferis (1999)	Self-Titled (2001)	Parade of Chaos (2002)

Professional ratings
Review scores
Source	Rating
AllMusic	2.5/5 stars
Decapolis	not rated
Jesus Freak Hideout	3.5/5 stars

Self-Titled is the fifth studio album by American metalcore band Zao, released on February 21, 2001, by Solid State/Tooth & Nail/EMI. The entire album was written in the recording studio by Scott and Jesse. Dan would be sent the tracks to write lyrics and then recorded them. The band famously broke up on stage (in Pennsylvania, Sept 2001) touring this album.

== Track listing ==
All lyrics are written by Daniel Weyandt, except where noted; all music is composed by Scott Mellinger and Jesse Smith, except where noted.

No.	Title	Lyrics	Music	Length
1.	"5 Year Winter"			2:28
2.	"Alive Is Dead"	Instrumental	Smith	2:45
3.	"A Tool to Scream"		Mellinger, Smith, Russ Cogdell	4:10
4.	"Witchunter"	Smith	Mellinger, Smith	3:09
5.	"Trashcanhands (Keyboard Cowards)"			3:37
6.	"The Race of Standing Still"			5:07
7.	"FJL"	Smith	Smith	2:01
8.	"The End of His World"			3:09
9.	"The Dreams That Don't Come True"			5:59
10.	"At Zero (Simeon Simmons)"			3:38

== Credits ==
- Daniel Weyandt – vocals, percussion
- Scott Mellinger – guitar, bass, percussion
- Jesse Smith – drums, acoustic guitar, clean vocals, bass guitar, keyboards, percussion, programming
- Rob Horner – bass (Credited but did not perform)

Production

- Russ Cogdell – composer
- Brian Gardner – mastering
- David Johnson – photography
- Jason Magnusson – engineer
- Barry Poynter – engineer, bass

== Charts ==
Chart (2001)	Peak position
Billboard Top Christian Albums	30
