= The Splinter Shards the Birth of Separation =

Studio album by Zao
- Released: April 1, 1997
- Recorded: October 1996
- Studio: Oz Studios, Baltimore, Maryland
- Genre: Hardcore punk, metalcore
- Length: 44:55
- Label: Tooth & Nail
- Producer: Zao, Drew Mazurek

Zao studio album chronology
All Else Failed (1995)	The Splinter Shards the Birth of Separation (1997)	Where Blood and Fire Bring Rest (1998)

Professional ratings
Review scores
Source	Rating
Jesus Freak Hideout	1.5/5 stars

The Splinter Shards the Birth of Separation is the second studio album by American metalcore band Zao, released on Tooth & Nail Records on April 1, 1997.

In 2020, the band repressed the album, alongside the follow-up album, Where Blood and Fire Bring Rest, to vinyl with both albums getting around 500 each and new artwork done by David Rankin.

== Track listing ==
All lyrics are written by Shawn Jonas, except where noted; all music is composed by Zao.

No.	Title	Lyrics	Length
1.	"Times of Separation"	Jesse Smith	5:01
2.	"Surrounds Me"		4:32
3.	"Exchange"		3:34
4.	"Particle"	Smith	2:50
5.	"Repressed"	Roy Goudy	4:11
6.	"In Loving Kindness"	Jonas, Smith	3:44
7.	"Endure"		4:10
8.	"The Children Cry for Help"	Jonas, Smith	5:31
9.	"Resistance"		3:01
10.	"Song 1"		8:21
Total length:			44:55

== Credits ==
ZAO

- Shawn Jonas - vocals
- Roy Goudy - guitar
- Mic Cox - bass
- Jesse Smith - drums

Production

- Drew Mazurek - engineer, mixing, producer
- Brian Gardner - mastering
- Brandon Ebel - executive producer
- Jefferson Steele - photography
- Eskew Reeder - composer
- Steve Wayne - composer
