= Parade of Chaos =

Studio album by Zao
- Released: July 10, 2002
- Recorded: 2002
- Studio: Poynter's Palace, Little Rock, Arkansas
- Genre: Metalcore
- Length: 37:54
- Label: Solid State; Tooth & Nail; EMI
- Producer: Barry Poynter; Jesse Smith; Scott Mellinger

Zao chronology
| Self-Titled (2001) | Parade of Chaos (2002) | All Else Failed (2003) |

Zao studio album chronology
| Self-Titled (2001) | Parade of Chaos (2002) | The Funeral of God (2004) |

Professional ratings
Review scores
| Source | Rating |
|---|---|
| Allmusic | 4/5 stars |
| Jesus Freak Hideout | 4.5/5 stars |
| Lambgoat | 9/10 stars |

Parade of Chaos is the sixth studio album by American metalcore band Zao. Released on July 10, 2002, by Solid State/Tooth & Nail/EMI. This album was recorded similarly to Self-Titled with Scott and Jesse writing in the studio and Dan being absent until time to record vocals. This album was also recorded at the same time as the recording of the All Else Failed reissue.

== Track listing ==
All tracks are written by Zao.

| No. | Title | Length |
|---|---|---|
| 1. | "The Buzzing" | 3:23 |
| 2. | "Suspend/Suspension" | 5:51 |
| 3. | "Parade of Chaos" | 2:40 |
| 4. | "Angel Without Wings" | 3:45 |
| 5. | "Killing Cupid" | 3:32 |
| 6. | "Free the Three" | 4:05 |
| 7. | "Man in the Womb" | 4:14 |
| 8. | "A Pirate's Prayer" | 4:12 |
| 9. | "The Ballad of Buddy Bigsby" | 1:48 |
| 10. | "How Are the Weak Free" | 4:24 |
| Total length: | | 37:54 |

== Credits ==
Zao

- Daniel Weyandt – vocals
- Scott Mellinger – guitar, bass
- Jesse Smith – drums, guitar, clean vocals

Production

- Barry Poynter – engineer, mixing, producer
- Brian Gardner – mastering

== Charts ==
| Chart (2002) | Peak position |
|---|---|
| Billboard Top Christian Albums | 21 |
| Billboard Heatseekers Albums | 25 |

== Notes ==
- "Free the Three" was inspired by the West Memphis Three, three young men who were tried and convicted of the murders of three boys in West Memphis, Arkansas on May 5, 1993.

== Quotes ==
- "This disc is incredible... Yet again, I am amazed by the imagination Zao shows in breaking the pre-conceived notions of what hardcore (or even hard music in general) should sound like." - Lambgoat.com
