= Liberate Te Ex Inferis =

Studio album by Zao
- Released: August 10, 1999
- Recorded: 1998–1999
- Studio: Poynter Studios (North Little Rock, Arkansas)
- Genre: Metalcore
- Length: 40:13
- Label: Solid State/Tooth & Nail
- Producer: Barry Poynter

Zao studio album chronology
Where Blood and Fire Bring Rest (1998)	Liberate Te Ex Inferis (1999)	Self-Titled (2001)

Professional ratings
Review scores
Source	Rating
HM	(not rated)
Exit Zine	5/5 stars
Jesus Freak Hideout	4.5/5 stars

Liberate Te Ex Inferis is the fourth studio album by American metalcore band Zao. It is considered by many to be their most experimental and darkest album. It was released on Solid State/Tooth & Nail. This album features the addition of bassist Rob Horner. Liberate is the first Zao album to feature Scott Mellinger, who replaced Brett Detar after his decision to pursue The Juliana Theory full-time.

Both drummer Jesse Smith and vocalist Daniel Weyandt have stated during interviews that the music of post-metal band Neurosis had a heavy influence on this album's overall sound.

The album received the vinyl treatment in May 2011 from Broken Circles Records. It features new cover art, designed by Brent Lakes. It was re-issued on vinyl a second time in 2022, by Solid State. That version features all new artwork by Dave Rankin, who had previously done the artwork for Where Blood and Fire Bring Rest.

== Content ==
The theme of the album art is based on Dante's inferno, as the songs are grouped in pairs named after the rings in hell. Because of this arrangement, the album is often mistakenly labeled as a concept album. The band members themselves, however, had nothing to do with the idea and very little input on the artwork and layout.

The album contains several samples from the science fiction horror movie Event Horizon. The title of the album, which is Latin for "Free Yourself from Hell", is also a quote from Event Horizon.

== Track listing ==
All lyrics are written by Daniel Weyandt; all music is composed by Zao.

Circle I: Limbo
No.	Title	Length
1.	"Intro"	3:38
2.	"Savannah"	2:46

Circle II: The Lustful
No.	Title	Length
3.	"Autopsy"	2:12
4.	"If These Scars Could Speak"	4:43

Circle III: The Gluttonous
No.	Title	Length
5.	"The Ghost Psalm"	5:42
6.	"Desire the End"	4:58

Circle IV: The Hoarders and the Spendthrifts
No.	Title	Length
7.	"Dark Cold Sound"	3:10
8.	"Skin Like Winter"	2:23

Circle V: The Wrathful
No.	Title	Length
9.	"Kathleen Barbra"	3:35
10.	"Man in Cage Jack Wilson"	7:00
Total length:		40:13

== Personnel ==
Zao

- Daniel Weyandt – vocals
- Scott Mellinger – guitar
- Russ Cogdell – guitar
- Jesse Smith – drums
- Rob Horner – bass

Production

- Brandon Ebel - Executive Producer
- Bernie Grundman - Mastering
- David Johnson - Photography
- Jason Parker - Artwork, Graphic Conception, Graphic Design
- Barry Poynter - Producer
