= Society's Finest =

American metalcore band

- Origin: Dallas, Texas, U.S.
- Genres: Christian metal, metalcore
- Years active: 1997–2002; 2004–2011; 2014–present
- Labels: Solid State; Pluto; Goodfellow; Hand of Hope; Alveran
- Members: Joshua Ashworth; Joel Bailey; Jordan Brady; Chad Wilburn
- Past members: Kris McCaddon; Tim Lambesis; Nick Nowell; Daniel Clark; Kevin Roddy; Lucas Laskaris; Guy Turner; Jaymz Alain; Pete Rose; Stephen Poole; Rob Pruett; Randal Watts; Pete Rose; Kane Kelly; Tyler Berry; David Cerezo; Jason Roe; Nick Sacy; Eli Bowser; Daniel Barton; Iasko
- Website: Society's Finest on Facebook

Society's Finest is an American metalcore band from Dallas, Texas. Their first full-length album, The Journey...So Far, was released on Solid State Records in May 2000. Due to member changes and personal matters the band took a break from touring and recording to focus on their personal lives. During this hiatus, vocalist Josh Ashworth toured with the metalcore band Zao.

When re-forming in 2004, the band joined Hand of Hope Records. With this label, they released Love, Murder, and a Three Letter Word in mid-2004. It contained new songs, along with old songs from their debut EP, Private Conflicts and Suicides (Pluto Records). Their third album, And I, the Drunkard, was released in June 2006.

Vocalist Josh Ashworth is the only remaining original member. Past members have gone on to join other bands including As I Lay Dying, Demon Hunter, and The Famine. The band has shared stages with P.O.D., Zao, The Dillinger Escape Plan, Living Sacrifice, Stretch Arm Strong, Hatebreed, and Stavesacre.

== History ==
Society's Finest started in 1997 with the original members of Josh Ashworth (vocals), Rob Pruett (guitars), Derek Rawls (guitars), Joel Bailey (bass), and Phillip Brummett (drums). The band recorded their debut EP, a split with My Spacecoaster in 1998. They went on to write and record the album "Private Conflicts and Suicides" in 1999. The band replaced Phillip Brummett with Josh Burnett on drums after the release of this album. They then went on to write and record their debut album, The Journey...So Far (released via Solid State Records) between 1999 and 2003. The band line up changed again as they grew to see the departure of Derek Rawls on guitar and Josh Burnett on drums.

The band reunited in 2004 with Ashworth, Bailey and multiple new members including Nick Nowell (guitars), Daniel Clark (guitars) and Lucas Laskaris (drums). The band recorded their second album, Love, Murder, and a Three Letter Word, in 2004. Nowell and Poole left the band in 2006.

The band replaced Nowell and Poole with Guy Turner (guitars) and former drummer Chad Wilburn. However, in the process of writing, Wilburn quit. The band could not find a replacement, so they hired former Between the Buried and Me drummer Jason Roe. Roe recorded part of the album before they found a replacement, Jesse Smith, formerly of Zao. Though Smith stated he never actually joined the band. And I, the Drunkard was released on Alveran Records in 2006. The band broke up for the second time in 2011.

With a whole new lineup, Ashworth reunited the band with Tyler Berry (guitars), David Cezero (bass), and Jason Roe in 2014, for a celebration of the life of former guitarist Randall Watts. The band stated that they were currently writing for a new album, but no further information has been released. In 2017, Ashworth did an interview claiming that the band now consisted only of himself and former guitarist Eli Bowser.

In 2021, the band announced a new release in the future with the lineup of Ashworth, Bowser, former bassist Daniel Barton, and Lasko(Laskaris) back on drums.

== Members ==
Current

- Josh Ashworth – lead vocals (1997–2003, 2004–2011, 2014–present)
- Joel Bailey – bass (1997–2003, 2004–2006, 2022–present)
- Jordan Brady – drums (2002), bass (2014), guitars (2022–present)
- Chad Wilburn – drums (1997–2001, 2005–2011, 2017–2021, 2022–present)

Former

- Kris McCaddon – guitar (1999–2001)
- Rob Pruett – guitar (1997–2000)
- Tim Lambesis – guitar (2000–2001)
- Kane Kelly – guitar (2000)
- James Allain – drums (2001–2002)
- Daniel Clark – guitar (2001–2003)
- Pete Rose – bass (2003)
- Guy Turner – guitar (2004–2011)
- Nick Nowell – guitar (2004–2006)
- Randall Watts – guitar (2004–2005; deceased)
- Stephen Poole – drums (2004–2005)
- David Cerezo – bass (2014–2016)
- Tyler Berry – guitar (2014–2016)
- Jason Roe – drums (2006, 2014–2016)
- Eli Bowser – guitar (2004–2011, 2016–2022)
- Daniel Barton – bass (2006–2011, 2021–2022)
- Iasko – drums (2021–2022)

== Discography ==
Studio albums

Year	Title	Tracks
2000	The Journey...So Far: Label: Solid State Records	1. "1955" (2:48); 2. "6 Seconds Left Until Daylight" (3:35); 3. "Lucky 13" (2:08); 4. "Kiss the Girls" (3:55); 5. "Knife Fight" (5:30); 6. "Monarch" (2:16); 7. "7 Years of Momentum" (3:46); 8. "Martial Reality" (3:09); 9. "Following the Robertsons" (3:43); 10. "Dead People" (3:18)
2004	Love, Murder, and a Three Letter Word: Label: Hand of Hope Records	1. "Vanity and the Gun" (3:05); 2. "Pop Culture in Houston" (2:55); 3. "Ennis, TX" (2:45); 4. "The Art... The Morgue" (2:46); 5. "Always a Bridesmaid, Never a Bride" (3:41); 6. "A Cold Winters Mourning" (4:44); 7. "Eggshell" (3:25); 8. "Journeyman" (3:32); 9. "Zero-Nine-Three-Zero" (3:29)
2006	And I, the Drunkard: Label: Alveran Records	1. "NYC"; 2. "And I, the Drunkard"; 3. "Cutters, Oh Cutters"; 4. "One More Kiss"; 5. "Holland"; 6. "Sunday Prayer"; 7. "Goddess"; 8. "Fourth Floor Corpse"; 9. "Nebraska"; 10. "Dear, Rebecca Nurse"; 11. "Untitled"; 12. "Deadlightstrangers"

EPs

- Private Conflicts and Suicides (1999) Additional musicians for this album were Derek Rawls (guitar), Phillip Brummett (drums), and Josh Burnett (drums).
- The Difference Between Us (2001; split EP with Rise Over Run)
- My Spacecoaster & Society's Finest (1998; split EP with My Spacecoaster) Additional musicians for this album were Derek Rawls (guitar) and Phillip Brummett (drums).
