= Where Blood and Fire Bring Rest =

Studio album by Zao
- Released: May 19, 1998
- Studio: Poynter Recordings, Little Rock, Arkansas
- Genre: Metalcore
- Length: 39:59
- Label: Solid State/Tooth & Nail
- Producer: Barry Poynter, Bruce Fitzhugh

Zao studio album chronology
The Splinter Shards the Birth of Separation (1997)	Where Blood and Fire Bring Rest (1998)	Liberate Te Ex Inferis (1999)

Professional ratings
Review scores
Source	Rating
Allmusic	4.5/5 stars
Alternative Press	
Jesus Freak Hideout	4.5/5 stars

Where Blood and Fire Bring Rest is the third studio album by American metalcore band Zao on Solid State/Tooth & Nail. It was the first album to feature vocalist Dan Weyandt after the departure of Shawn Jonas along with new bassists/guitarists, Russ Cogdell and Brett Detar, which is the only album to feature Detar. The album contains a sample from the film The Shining at the end of "Lies of Serpents, A River of Tears", as well as a sample from the horror film The Prophecy during the intro to "Ravage Ritual". It is often considered among the greatest metalcore albums ever made.

== Lyrical content ==
The lyrics on Blood & Fire deal with personal issues that vocalist Dan Weyandt was dealing with at the time they were written. The song "To Think of You Is to Treasure an Absent Memory", deals with the suffering, and untimely deaths of Weyandt's friends and stepbrother. "Lies of Serpents" and "Ravage Ritual" both deal with hypocrisy in the Christian Church.

== Track listing ==
All tracks are written by Zao.

No.	Title	Length
1.	"Lies of Serpents, a River of Tears"	2:39
2.	"To Think of You Is to Treasure an Absent Memory"	4:27
3.	"A Fall Farewell"	2:56
4.	"March"	3:51
5.	"Ember"	2:26
6.	"Ravage Ritual"	3:15
7.	"Fifteen Rhema"	3:33
8.	"For a Fair Desire"	3:03
9.	"The Latter Rain"	6:28
10.	"Violet"	7:18
Total length:		39:59

== Personnel ==
Zao

- Daniel Weyandt – vocals
- Russ Cogdell – guitar, bass
- Jesse Smith – drums
- Brett Detar – guitar, bass, piano

Production

- Don Clark - Concept, Design, Layout Design
- Dave Rankin - Artwork
- Brandon Ebel - Executive Producer
- Bruce Fitzhugh - Producer
- Brian Gardner - Mastering
- Jason Magnusson - Assistant Producer
- Tim Owen - Photography
- Barry Poynter - Engineer, Mixing

== Album information ==
- Record label (vinyl version): Broken Circles Records
