= Zao (American band) =

American metalcore band

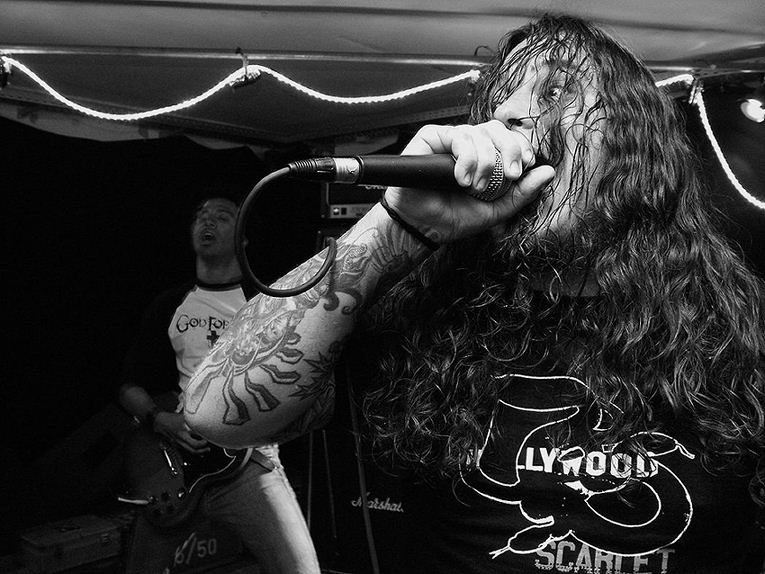
- Members Russ Cogdell (left) and Dan Weyandt performing in 2004

Background information
- Origin: Parkersburg, West Virginia
- Genres: Metalcore; post-hardcore; alternative metal
- Years active: 1993–present
- Labels: Ferret; Solid State; Steadfast; Tooth & Nail; Broken Circles; Mind Over Matter
- Spinoffs: The Juliana Theory; Gods; Lonely Ghost Parade
- Members: Dan Weyandt; Scott Mellinger; Martin Lunn; Jeff Gretz; Russ Cogdell
- Past members: Eric Reeder; Roy Goudy; Mic Cox; Jesse Smith; Shawn Jonas; Ron Gray; Kevin Moran; Brett Detar; Rob Horner; Shawn Koschik; Stephen Peck
- Website: zaoonline.net

Zao (/ˈzeɪ.oʊ/) is an American metalcore band founded in Parkersburg, West Virginia, and later relocated to Greensburg, Pennsylvania. Founded in March 1993, Zao has hosted several musicians and endured numerous roster changes to the point where no original members remain. Former drummer Jesse Smith, vocalist Dan Weyandt, and guitarists Scott Mellinger and Russ Cogdell are seen by some fans as the "core" of Zao, with the current line up being the longest running in the band's history.

For a time, the band featured Christian themes in their music and was regarded as a Christian band, however this theme was eventually met with debate among the members and the band currently no longer considers themselves a "Christian band" with only bassist Martin Lunn identifying as a Christian.

To date, Zao has released 11 full-length albums, 9 EPs or splits, a two-disc DVD documentary and embarked on numerous concert tours, garnering a limited but global fan base and earning critical praise in the process.

== History ==
=== The first era (1993–1997) ===
The founding members of Zao, were vocalist Eric Reeder, guitarist Roy Goudy, bassist Mic Cox, and drummer Jesse Smith. The band's name comes from the Greek word ζάω, which means 'alive' or 'to have life'. Zao vocalist Eric Reeder has been credited with coming up with the band's name. Calling their sound "Christ-centered hardcore", they sought to reach an audience that they felt has been pushed away from the organized church. Most of their early songs, which appeared on their first two full-length albums, All Else Failed and The Splinter Shards the Birth of Separation (which saw the band re-recording much of the All Else Failed material), contained explicit references to God and centered on the theme of the peace of God. Reeder (who appeared on Zao's Author and Sustained demos, as well as a split with Outcast) left before Zao recorded All Else Failed and was replaced by Shawn Jonas, who went on to form Symphony in Peril. Jonas left the band after recording two albums and is now a youth pastor at New Life Church in West Virginia; original bassist Mic Cox left the band, and Kevin Moran took his place. Ron Gray also joined the band as a second guitarist after the recording of The Splinter Shards the Birth of Separation. All of the band members, except for drummer Jesse Smith, quit Zao following the 1997 Cornerstone festival and a couple of shows they played on the way back home.

=== The second era (1998–2002) ===
In 1998, Smith recruited Brett Detar, guitarist of Pennsylvania emocore band Pensive, to help him build a new incarnation of Zao. Detar suggested a pair of his friends, guitarist Russ Cogdell and vocalist Dan Weyandt. Both Cogdell and Weyandt had played in Christian hardcore band Seasons in the Field, who had released a split EP with Pensive. Smith would drive several hours to Greensburg, where all these new members lived, to co-write and rehearse what would become the first (and in many ways, defining) album from the new Zao, Where Blood and Fire Bring Rest. The group played fewer and fewer songs from the old version of the band as Blood and Fire took hold. When it came time to embark on tour for the band's new lineup, Moran, who had continued with the band up until this point, departed, which led to the band touring without a bassist. The band set stages ablaze with their raw emotion and Weyandt's personal storytelling, which detailed the hardships that informed their songs. With a rockabilly look and Smith's oddly engaging habit of setting up his drums facing away from the audience, their live reputation grew large in the underground. Not long after recording their half of a split EP with labelmates Training for Utopia in California, Detar left the group in 1999 to focus his energy on his rock side-project The Juliana Theory, who would sign to Sony and have a successful career before disbanding in 2006.

Following Detar's departure, Smith expressed interest in putting the band on a brief hiatus, which led to Weyandt and Cogdell forming a new project called Eight Stars for Elijah in the vein of Sunny Day Real Estate. Scott Mellinger (formerly of Creation Is Crucifixion) played guitars in the band, alongside Weyandt, while Cogdell played drums, alongside friend Tim on bass. However, at the same time the bassist moved to Florida, Smith returned with the proposition of bringing Zao back to record a new album. Weyandt and Cogdell pushed for Mellinger to join the band, to which Smith agreed. Mellinger joined the band on lead guitar and Rob Horner, a longtime friend of Smith's, came in on bass. With this lineup at hand, the band would enter the studio to record another seminal metalcore album, Liberate Te Ex Inferis (Latin for "Save Yourself from Hell", a line from the movie Event Horizon), which came out through Solid State Records. According to Weyandt, the lyrical themes were very dark on the record, which led to him lying to certain people about what the songs were actually written about. After the album was recorded, Cogdell left the band in 2000 to go to film school, while Weyandt also quit the band to work as a tattoo artist. The band would then embark on tour with Today is the Day and Nile following their departure, which led to Mellinger, Horner, and Smith hiring Corey Darst on vocals for the tour.

Once the band returned from tour, they traveled to the studio to record Zao's fifth album titled Self-Titled, with Weyandt coming by for a few days to contribute his lyrics and vocals. By this point, Weyandt returned to the band with Darst being replaced. The album is notable for Smith's dark pop interludes, the V-Drum sound and the song "Five Year Winter", which remains a signature Zao song. When the band traveled to the studio at Barry Poynter, the band had only written two songs by the time they arrived. "Five Year Winter" had been written on the car ride down to the studio, which was in Little Rock, Arkansas. Only Mellinger and Smith wrote and recorded the material. In hindsight, Mellinger expressed that he wishes he could re-record the album with live drums and change other small things. The initial title for the album was Alive Is Dead, but due to The Juliana Theory's Emotion is Dead being released, they did not want to give the impression they were copying them. Corey Darst replaced Weyandt for the majority of the touring in support of the album, with Horner returning, and second guitarist Matt Auxier joining up. Darst never appeared on a Zao album although this version of the group (Darst, Smith, Mellinger and Horner) did cut a three-song demo during a Seattle tour stop. The group talked about signing with either Sanctuary or Century Media Records, but Zao "broke up" on stage at a December 2001 show in Pittsburgh (later documented on their DVD). They were to embark on a tour with The Juliana Theory and Weyandt had joined Darst onstage as a special guest, but an incapacitated Jesse Smith could not make it through the show and long-brewing tensions boiled over.

Smith, however, once again, contacted Solid State Records and Tooth & Nail Records funded the next Zao projects: a brand new album that featured just Smith, Mellinger, and Weyandt called Parade of Chaos, as well as a re-recording of the original Zao's All Else Failed played by the same trio. In the documentary The Lesser Lights of Heaven, the band disavowed the re-recording, admitting they did it because they were broke and needed to fulfill their record contract with Solid State. Parade of Chaos was considered to be a "half-hearted" release, due to the members' being burned out on the band and that it was planned to fulfill their contract. Smith and Mellinger were the only members at the time and had attempted to figure out who they wanted on vocals, with Darst and Ryan Downey of Burn It Down (later their manager with Superhero Management) being considered. Downey convinced Smith that Weyandt needed to be a part of the album. Weyandt recorded both Parade of Chaos and All Else Failed within three days. Following the album's release, Weyandt, Mellinger, Smith and a returning Cogdell set-out on the "Burn It Down and Walk Away Tour", billed as Zao's "final" tour, with support from special guests Underoath, Unearth, Dead Poetic, and The Underwater. Although technically a tour in support of Parade of Chaos as well, no songs from the album were featured in the set-list. After the 2002 tour, the group's members focused on other projects, most notably Cogdell and Mellinger's more rock-oriented Jade Meridian and Horner's two-year stint with the Wheeling, West Virginia sci-fi metal band The Minus Tide.

=== The third era (2003–2006) ===
However, the Liberate era lineup reconvened in Greensburg around the promise of a new record label that offered to fund a new Zao album. The "label" ended up falling apart before a note of music was ever recorded, prompting Smith to reach out to Ferret Music who agreed to sign the band to a two-album deal. After cutting some new demos, Weyandt left the group, due to some issues with addiction at the time. Society's Finest singer Joshua Ashworth was asked by Smith to join the group. This version of Zao did a few shows and recorded a couple of songs. Living Sacrifice drummer Lance Garvin filled in for Smith when the rest of the guys could not find him for a couple of 2003 festival dates. However, by the end of 2003, Cogdell and Mellinger realized they did not want to make a Zao record without Dan on vocals. Smith and Horner quit Zao and joined up with former bassist Kevin Moran to focus on their new band, Gods. Ashworth stepped aside. With Weyandt back on board, the remaining three "core" members recruited the rhythm section from Jade Meridian (bass player Shawn Koschick, drummer Stephen Peck) to round-out the Zao lineup. At this time the band started to write their 7th album. For a time, the band could not find a bassist or a drummer, with talks of Cogdell playing drums if they could not find someone.

In 2004, Zao released The Funeral of God — a concept album that imagined a world where God had chosen to abandon mankind. Ferret heavily advertised the album, the group made their first music video (for "The Rising End"), and went on several tours of the US, resulting in the biggest selling Zao album to date. Though they had played a few shows there before, Zao did their first-ever extensive European headlining tour with this lineup. Shawn told the band he would be leaving just before the "Praise the War Machine" US headlining tour, but he did complete the tour. The sold-out show at Glasshouse in Pomona, CA was filmed for the band's in-the-works DVD. Longtime friend, tour manager, and former Pensive member Marty Lunn took over the bass position before Zao co-headlined the "City of Champions" tour with The Juliana Theory. The following year, Stephen Peck told the band he was quitting two weeks before they were set to leave for the UK to tour with Bleeding Through. Scrambling to find a replacement, the group hired local drummer Jeff Gretz. Weyandt worked close by to Gretz's place of employment and evidently left Gretz a note that the band needed a drummer. The UK tour was followed by the "Strhess Tour" across the US in the summer of 2005 with Bleeding Through, Darkest Hour and Misery Signals. The Los Angeles and San Diego shows were recorded for the upcoming DVD. In 2005, the band released their DVD, The Lesser Lights of Heaven, mapping their history up till that point, having members from different bands, including: Don and Ryan Clark (Demon Hunter, Training for Utopia), Bruce Fitzhugh (Living Sacrifice), Chris McLane (Stretch Arm Strong), Jimmy Ryan (Haste the Day, Trenches), and CJ Anderson (Sinai Beach), as well as Ferrett Music's staff and Roy Culver of Solid State Records.

In January 2006, Weyandt, Mellinger, Lunn, and Gretz traveled to Chicago to record their next album with one of their collective heroes, Steve Albini. The making of The Fear Is What Keeps Us Here was documented for a limited edition DVD. The band set out with the goal of recording an album that felt like a band and not individual members recording their parts separately, as well as having an album with no "filler songs". Directly after recording, Zao hit the road with In Flames, Trivium and DevilDriver. After that, they co-headlined their second "Ferret Music Tour". However, they were forced to head home early after Weyandt severely injured his hand. The Fear... was released in June while Zao was on tour with Demon Hunter. The band filmed a video for "My Love, My Love (We've Come Back from the Dead)", a self-described "zombie love story", during that tour. The fall of 2006 saw Zao touring with Throwdown, Evergreen Terrace and Maylene and the Sons of Disaster. During the tour, Mellinger and Weyandt both agreed that Zao should embark on a long break after the tour. Eager to continue touring, Gretz left Zao not long after and became the drummer for From Autumn to Ashes. Gretz states that he only announced his departure as Zao was becoming inactive and he wanted to continue working and that no one would hire him if they believed he was still a full-time member of Zao.

=== The fourth era (2007–2009) ===
On January 23, 2007, Zao announced in a lengthy statement that Russ Cogdell had rejoined the band after recovering from his knee surgery. Zao stated that they would not fill the drum position. Josh Walters, formerly of The Juliana Theory, would fill-in if/when the band next appeared live. The band said they had completed their two-album deal with Ferret Music but did not say who would be releasing their next album. There was no news on whether they intended to re-sign to Ferret or seek a new label. Not long after the statement was released, the band said that Walters would in fact not be performing with them.

In mid-2008, Zao played their first show since 2006 with Demon Hunter at Mr. Smalls in Pittsburgh, PA. The lineup for the show was Weyandt, Mellinger, Lunn and Gretz. Following this, they began recording their new album, Awake?, with Scott Mellinger, Daniel Castleman and As I Lay Dying singer Tim Lambesis co-producing. The guitars and bass were all engineered by Mellinger, vocals engineered by Dave Hidek, and the drums were engineered by Castleman. The band finished vocal recording in November 2008 with engineer Dave Hidek at Treelady Studios, located in Pittsburgh, PA. According to Gretz, Lambesis was not highly involved in the production, with Daniel Castleman being very hands-on. The band released the album on May 5, 2009, on Ferret Records.

=== The fifth era (2010–present) ===
The band took to the web updating the world on the status of the band, as it stands, ZAO is Daniel Weyandt, Scott Mellinger, Russ Cogdell, Marty Lunn and Jeff Gretz. Among other things in the recent update, the band said they were extremely surprised at how well their last album, Awake?, did in the market considering it had no tour support by them and that it was thrown onto Ferret's label in the 11th hour. Zao said the best thing to come out of it is that they learned a lot of the last release and it showed them that fans still enjoy their music and this inspired and motivated them to continue making music. According to social media reports, on July 11, 2014, Zao went into the studio, after a five-year unofficial hiatus and working on side projects like Lonely Ghost Parade and Young Fox, is currently, tracking and recording their 11th album. Guitar tracking began in January 2015. Xenophobe, the band's first EP since 1998, was released on July 10, 2015.

On October 13, 2016, the band released "Observed/Observer", the second song that would be on The Well-Intentioned Virus, the first being "Xenophobe". The band premiered the next song, "A Well-Intentioned Virus", on October 27, 2016. On December 1, 2016, the band released the album stream for The Well-Intentioned Virus. The band announced an EP, Pyrrhic Victory, which was released on November 3, 2017.

In the first half of 2018, Zao announced that their 2004 album The Funeral of God would be released on vinyl by Tragic Hero Records, but this release got caught up in legal issues and has yet to be released. On September 21, 2018, the band released a split 7-inch vinyl with Yashira through American record label Mind Over Matter Records, which included the songs "Hide From the Light" (Zao) and "Led to Ache" (Yashira). They followed this split up with a 7-inch EP entitled Decoding Transmissions From the Möbius Strip on February 8, 2019, which included the tracks "Transmission 1: I Saw The End" and "Transmission 2: I Saw The Devil." The same announcement by the band hinted at a new album in the works. Starting in August 2019, the band is embarking on a Midwest tour of the United States with Hollow Earth and Wolf King. On November 15, 2019, the band released Reformat/Reboot, a remix album featuring eight remixed tracks from The Well-Intentioned Virus. It was released on numerous formats including a Nintendo Entertainment System game cartridge. On April 9, 2021, the band released their eleventh studio album, The Crimson Corridor, the band's second release with their independent label, Observed/Observer Recordings.

== Musical Style ==
Zao has been predominantly described as a Metalcore band. Early on the groups sound was firmly rooted in Hardcore Punk with some Metal leanings. As time went on and with member changes their sound began to incorporate more eclectic and dynamic influences beginning with “Where Blood and Fire Bring Rest.” Their fourth album “Liberate te Ex Inferis” saw the group experiment the most with their sound up to that point. Incorporating keys, spoken word vocals and a heavier, darker aesthetic. Subsequent albums have continued this experimentation with critics noting elements of Black Metal, Noise Rock, Sludge Metal, Mathcore, Post-Metal and Shoegaze in their sound while still retaining aggressive vocals, interlocking guitars and a pummeling rhythm section.

Despite having never achieved mainstream success, Zao is well regarded and respected among their peers and in the Metal/Hardcore community. The band has been noted as influential group by members of Underoath, Norma Jean, Demon Hunter, Converge, and Every Time I Die.

Christianity has been a key influence in the band's early work; because the founding members claimed to have a strong relationship with God, they were considered a devoted Christian band with second vocalist Shawn Jonas often preaching Christianity between songs, which changed as time passed and members changed. Former drummer Jesse Smith slowly changed the band's vision with citing wanting to be able to play to more secular music scenes and providing less emphasis on religion because he felt the original line-up would "force it down peoples throats." Upon vocalist Daniel Weyandt joining the band; the lyrics shifted to more personal content albeit initially still retaining an occasional Christian message which became less prevalent with every album. Because only bassist Martin Lunn identifies as Christian, Zao no longer considered itself a Christian band but rather a group of open-minded artists with guitarist Scott Mellinger going on record and stating that Zao would prefer to just be known as a Metal band.

Lyrics in future productions may or may not include Christian messages, but Zao has stated they would have loved to return to the Christian Cornerstone Festival when it was still active. As of 2015, only one member of the band (bassist Martin Lunn) claims Christianity as their beliefs.

Certain members have gone on to state that they had never held the Christian belief, including Mellinger and longtime Bassist Rob Horner. Although it was previously stated that he was not a Christian upon his joining, Jeff Gretz stated that he was raised Catholic and that he "never said he never believed."

== Band members ==
Current members

Name	Instrument	Years	Other groups
Dan Weyandt	Harsh vocals	1998―present	Seasons in the Field, Lonely//Ghost//Parade, Sower
Scott Mellinger	lead guitar, clean vocals, bass, rhythm guitar (occasionally)	1999–present	Creation is Crucifixion, Lonely//Ghost//Parade, Jade Meridian
Martin Lunn	bass	2005–present	Pensive, The Operation, Jade Meridian, Young Fox
Jeff Gretz	drums	2005–present	From Autumn to Ashes, Emanuel and the Fear, Leverage Models, Epigene, Conelrad, Austrian Death Machine, Private Income, IKILLYA, Crank Radio
Russ Cogdell	rhythm guitar, bass (occasionally)	1998–2000, 2002, 2004–2006, 2010–present	Seasons in the Field, Sower, Los Capitanos, Jade Meridian

Past members

Name	Instrument	Years	Other groups
Eric Reeder	Harsh vocals	1993–1995	To Live As Sons
Shawn Jonas	Harsh vocals	1995–1998	Symphony in Peril
Roy Goudy	lead guitar, rhythm guitar (occasionally)	1993–1998	Times After Dusk, Minor Crisis
Mic Cox	bass	1993–1998	Monroe, To Live As Sons, XREDLINEX
Jesse Smith	drums, clean vocals	1993–2001, 2002―2004	Demon Hunter, Society's Finest, My Own Halo, Gods, Jesse Smith & the Holy Ghost, Left Out
Ron Gray	rhythm guitar	1997–1998	
Kevin Moran	bass	1997–1998	Gods
Brett Detar	lead guitar, bass (occasionally)	1997–1999	The Juliana Theory, Pensive
Rob Horner	bass, backing vocals	1999–2001, 2003-2004	Gods, The Minus Tide
Shawn Koschik	bass	2004–2005	Jade Meridian, Nodar
Stephen Peck	drums	2004–2005	Jade Meridian, Lonely//Ghost//Parade, Seasons in the Field

Live musicians

Name	Instrument	Years	Other groups
Corey Darst	Harsh vocals	2000–2001, 2017	The Pretty Weapons
Matt Auxier	rhythm guitar	2000–2001	Eyes Upon Separation, The Pretty Weapons, Teeth of the Hydra, EYE
Joshua Kabe Ashworth	Harsh vocals	2003–2004	Society's Finest
Lance Garvin	drums	2003	Living Sacrifice, Soul Embraced, Kill System,Throwdown (band)

Timeline

== Discography ==
- All Else Failed (1995, re-recorded in 2003)
- The Splinter Shards the Birth of Separation (1997)
- Where Blood and Fire Bring Rest (1998)
- Liberate Te Ex Inferis (1999)
- Zao (2001)
- Parade of Chaos (2002)
- The Funeral of God (2004)
- The Fear Is What Keeps Us Here (2006)
- Awake? (2009)
- The Well-Intentioned Virus (2016)
- The Crimson Corridor (2021)
