= Bobgoblin =

Bobgoblin is a three-man American rock band formed in 1993 in Dallas, Texas. The band has released three albums under the name Bobgoblin, which included one major-label release on MCA Records, and two albums under the Adventures of Jet name.

The band is known for wearing dark flight suits with numbers on the back and helmets during live performances.

With punk, post-punk, new wave, and 1970s glam influences, Bobgoblin took cues from bands such as The Clash with a satirically militant and anti-establishment stance mixed with the theatrics of David Bowie's backing band, The Spiders From Mars.

== Early years (1993–1996) ==
Bobgoblin formed in 1993 while drummer Rob Avsharian and lead vocalist/keyboardist Hop Litzwire were in college at the University of North Texas in Denton. The band initially formed under the constructs of a futuristic, metaphorical concept with the band being at the center of a war between a giant corporate/fascist state and a small sovereign state, The Liberation Front States, which endeavored to preserve individual freedom. In the concept, all of the members of the band are part of a patrol group called The Liberation Front States Motor Forces (LFSMF). Under the guise of this concept, Bobgoblin wore (and still wear) conforming jumpsuits that were the issued attire for the LFSMF.

For their first shows in 1993, Hop's brother, credited as Hech Mahech, joined the band on bass, and guitarist Lech Vogner, another University of North Texas graduate, to round out the band. Capitalizing on Hop and Hech's professional video experience, the first performances were complete with several old, salvaged televisions displaying chaotic montages edited together by Hop and Hech.

The 1993 line-up produced a four-song demo tape called "Rocket Box," which was distributed in the Dallas-Fort Worth area and used to book initial shows. In 1994, Bobgoblin independently released the full-length album "Jet," which helped increase the band's audience and made a name for themselves in the region while laying a foundation for their '70s and '80s punk, glam, and new wave-influenced sound. The band temporarily shut down, however, when both Hech Mahech and Lech Vogner left the band for professional reasons that same year.

In 1994, Tony Jannotta (conceptually named Corporal Glascock) joined the band on bass and helped revamp the Bobgoblin concept. From 1994 to 1996, the band enlisted several different guitar players as it built interest from audiences and record labels with record-producer/guitar-player and long-time friend Barry Poynter filling in the gaps on guitar as Bobgoblin continued to build a buzz.

== Major-label years on MCA (1996–1999) ==
In 1996, Bobgoblin signed with major label MCA Records, and with Barry Poynter acting as producer and guitar-player, they recorded "12-Point Master Plan." Jason Weisenberg of Dallas joined the band as the full-time guitarist upon the completion of the record.

"12-Point Master Plan" was released in spring 1997 and landed in the Top 75 chart on the College Music Journal. But with MCA struggling to deal with administrative problems and personnel changes, the record had difficulty reaching an audience. The band toured and tried to capitalize on radio play throughout the country.

Bobgoblin won an award at the 1998 USA International Film Festival in the category of "Outstanding Audio/Visual Production" for the Enhanced CD version of "12-Point Master Plan," which was one of the first of its kind in the music industry. Ahlby Galutin, an award-winning record producer most famous for his work with the Bee Gees and one of the creators of the Enhanced CD technology, worked at MCA at the time and pegged Bobgoblin as guinea pigs to experiment with the new technology in a CD release because of the band's conceptual bent and computer savvy members.

In 1999, after delivering the rough drafts for a second record to MCA, the band left the label to try to build a new life under a different name.

== The Adventures of Jet (2000–2004) ==
Based on Bobgoblin's first release, "Jet," the band renamed itself The Adventures of Jet (simply known as AOJ). In 2000, AOJ released "Part 3: Coping with Insignificance" on independent label My Records, headed by Lagwagon frontman Joey Cape. The record, thematically centered on the band's experiences in the corporate music world and with corporate conventions in general, accentuates more of Litzwire's keyboard counter-melodies and brought the band's '80s new-wave influences more to the fore. The record attracted a limited but international and avid following, almost completely separate from the audience built under Bobgoblin.

The band parted ways with Jason Weisenberg, and after some dormancy enlisted long-time friend Zach Blair (Rise Against, Hagfish) on guitar. After some time with Blair on guitar, the band changed directions once again when Jannotta returned to his first love as the guitar-player, and the band enlisted long-time friend and recording engineer Darian Stribling as the bass-player.

AOJ released its second album, "Muscle," in 2004 on Suburban Home Records. Combining themes of aging with a car-song concept, the record did not resonate enough to build on the foundation that "Part 3" had laid.

== Break Up and Reunion (2004 to current) ==
With Litzwire and Jannotta establishing families, the band called it quits after 2004 doing only the occasional Bobgoblin reunion show during the next few years.

In 2009–2010, inspired by renewed socio-political angst, the band returned to the Bobgoblin moniker and to its more abrasive influences to begin working on new songs.

In 2011, only able to record a little bit at a time because of professional time constraints, Bobgoblin's power-pop sound returned when it released the first part of a proposed longer record, an EP called "Love Lost for Blood Lust," which it completed and released as an LP in 2014.

Bobgoblin is currently recording a classic-arcade tribute EP, which is expected to be released in 2014, that is taking concepts from the band member's favorite video games of their youth and mixing them with social commentary.

== Personal life ==
Hop Litzwire, lead vocalist and keyboard player for Bobgoblin, won three Emmy Awards in 2010 for his documentary film on Arkansas cemeteries, "Silent Storytellers", which has had showings at the Bill Clinton School for Public Service.
