= Chomsky (band) =

American band

Chomsky is a Dallas-based band, consisting of Matt Kellum, Sean Halleck, Glen Reynolds, Don Cento, and James Driscoll.

== Founding ==
Chomsky originated in the early 1990s in Denton, Texas, under the moniker "House on The Hill". Guitarists Sean Halleck and John Norris of Arlington were in this initial group. By 1995, the band had changed its name to Chomsky and included Halleck, Norris, bassist James Driscoll, and drummers Rob Avsharian (of Bobgoblin) and Luke Adams. This lineup self-released an 8-track album in 1996 which was sold at shows in Denton. In 1997, Adams left the group and moved to Los Angeles, where he would later go on to drum for Pete Yorn. Matt Kellum of "The Doldrums" and "Blueface" replaced Adams, and the new lineup began recording with New Bohemian Wes Burt-Martin. However, Norris' side project, "Tommorowpeople", began to take up more of his time.

The Tomorrowpeople were then signed to DGC Records and were often out in Los Angeles, working on their first major label effort. This created problems for Chomsky, who relied heavily on Norris' keyboard and guitar eccentricities in their recordings and live show. Because of this, Chomsky played infrequently in 1997 and early 1998. In April 1998 new drummer Matt Kellum befriended guitarist Glen Reynolds backstage at Fry Street Fair. Reynolds was there to hang out with his friend and former drummer Pete Young, who was playing with .357 Lover that day. Kellum was there with former Chomsky drummer Avsharian and Reynolds stuck out to Kellum as the only non-drummer present. The two became fast friends and Kellum invited Reynolds to practice with the band in the future.

Kellum placed a follow-up call to Reynolds later the next week and the next day Reynolds, Driscoll, Kellum, and Halleck played together for the first time. This final Chomsky lineup would go on to play together for the next 10 years. At the band's first-ever practice, Halleck showed Reynolds a new song, "Road". Reynolds debuted with Chomsky a week after that first practice, playing a show at Dan's Bar on the eve of Kellum's University of North Texas graduation. Within three months, both Reynolds and Kellum moved from Denton to Dallas to work and take Chomsky more seriously.

Chomsky released its second full-length record in the summer of 1999. The record, A Few Possible Selections for the Soundtrack of Your Life, went on to win the band several Dallas Observer and Fort Worth Music awards in 2000.

== Touring ==
Chomsky spent their early years from 1994-1999 playing strictly in Denton and Dallas. The group branched out further, hitting places like Austin, Houston, Lubbock, and Fort Worth on a consistent basis. By 2001, Chomsky was often playing shows around Texas with Dallas label mates the Deathray Davies and DARYL. Chomsky also went on several "jaunts", or short national tours. The first of these was a late 2001 tour with Pennsylvania's The Juliana Theory. This tour spanned the states directly east of the Mississippi and included three Texas dates. 2002 was spent primarily doing short weekend tours of Texas with Idol records label mates DARYL and DRD. Also in 2002, a summer tour of the midwest saw Chomsky playing the Great Lakes area states. In 2003, Chomsky went on a tour of the Midwest and West Coasts twice as well as several shows in and around Texas, playing new cities in Texas such as San Marcos, Odessa, Wichita Falls, and Spring. On a 2004 West Coast tour Chomsky made an appearance on CBS' The Late Late Show with Craig Ferguson, during which the band played "Fine" from Let's Get To Second.

== Labels ==
Chomsky signed its first record deal with Dallas' Idol Records in 2000. Idol released the two most well-known Chomsky albums, A Few Possible Selections for the Soundtrack of Your Life and Onward Quirky Soldiers. In 2003, Chomsky signed with the uber-fledgling label Aezra Records of Phoenix, Arizona. The band recorded 2004's "Let's Get To Second" for that label. Chomsky has also released songs on several compilations, including Summer Break Records' "Sunny Teriyaki Hamburger Breakfast". Chomsky's 1996 first album and the 5 songs recorded by Wes Burt Martin in 1996-97 are out of print and were self-released.
