= Zao discography =

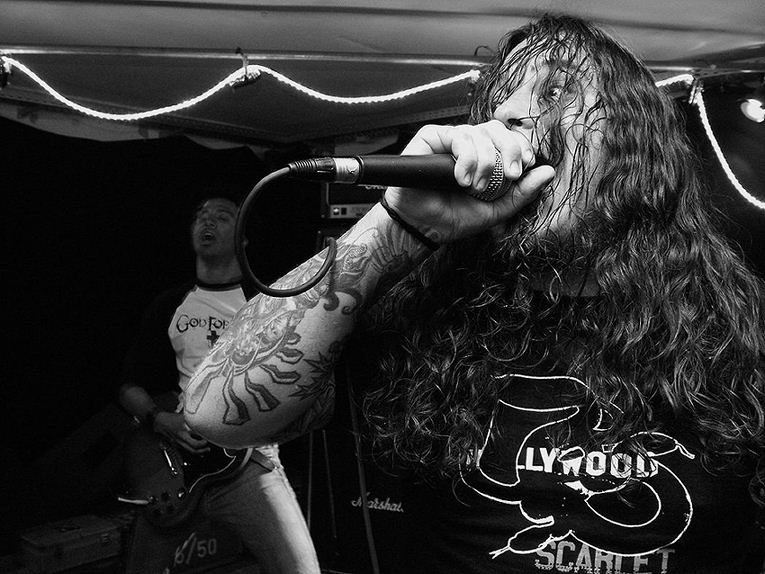
- Members Russ Cogdell (left) and Dan Weyandt performing in Germany, 2004
- Studio albums: 11
- EPs: 7
- Compilation albums: 2
- B-sides: 7
- Video albums: 1
- Music videos: 4
- Demos: 2

The following is the complete discography of Zao, an American metalcore band. The band's discography consists of eleven studio albums, two compilation albums, one video album, four music videos and seven extended plays.

== Albums ==
=== Studio albums ===
List of studio albums, with selected chart positions and certifications
Title	Album details	Peak chart positions				
Title	Album details	US Christian	US Heat	US Indie	US Hard Rock	US Rock
All Else Failed	Released: September 1, 1995; Label: Steadfast; Formats: CD, LP, DL	—	—	—	—	—
The Splinter Shards the Birth of Separation	Released: April 1, 1997; Label: Tooth & Nail/Solid State; Formats: CD, CS, LP, DL	—	—	—	—	—
Where Blood and Fire Bring Rest	Released: May 19, 1998; Label: Tooth & Nail/Solid State; Formats: CD, CS, LP, DL	—	—	—	—	—
Liberate Te Ex Inferis	Released: August 10, 1999; Label: Tooth & Nail/Solid State; Formats: CD, LP, DL	—	—	—	—	—
Self-Titled	Released: February 27, 2001; Label: Tooth & Nail/Solid State; Formats: CD, LP, DL	30	—	—	—	—
Parade of Chaos	Released: July 10, 2002; Label: Tooth & Nail/Solid State; Formats: CD, DL	21	25	—	—	—
The Funeral of God	Released: July 13, 2004; Label: Ferret; Formats: CD, DL	—	24	20	—	—
The Fear Is What Keeps Us Here	Released: June 13, 2006; Label: Ferret; Formats: CD, DL	—	12	21	—	—
Awake?	Released: May 5, 2009; Label: Ferret; Formats: CD, DL	28	19	45	—	—
The Well-Intentioned Virus	Released: December 9, 2016; Label: Observed/Observer Recordings; Formats: CD, CS, LP, DL	—	3	24	7	32
The Crimson Corridor	Released: April 9, 2021; Label: Observed/Observer Recordings; Formats: CD, CS, LP, DL	―	16	―	―	―
"—" denotes a recording that did not chart or was not released in that territory.

=== Re-recorded albums ===
List of studio albums, with selected chart positions and certifications
Title	Album details	Peak chart positions				
Title	Album details	US Christian	US Heat	US Indie	US Hard Rock	US Rock
All Else Failed	Released: February 19, 2003; Label: Tooth & Nail/Solid State; Formats: CD, DL	—	—	—	—	—
"—" denotes a recording that did not chart or was not released in that territory.

=== Compilation albums ===
List of compilation albums
Title	Album details
Legendary	Released: December 17, 2003; Label: Tooth & Nail/Solid State, EMI; Formats: CD, DL
The 2nd Era	Released: 2011; Label: Tooth & Nail/Solid State; Formats: CD, DL
Preface: Early Recordings 1995–1996	Released: October 9, 2020; Label: self-released; Formats: CD, DL

=== Extended plays ===
List of extended plays, with selected chart positions
Title	EP details	Peak chart positions
Title	EP details	US Heat
The Tie That Binds	Released: 1995; Label: Steadfast; Formats: CD, LP; Notes: Split with Outcast	—
Treadwater	Released: 1996; Label: Steadfast; Formats: CD, LP; Notes: Split with Through and Through	—
Training for Utopia / Zao	Released: August 18, 1998; Label: Tooth & Nail/Solid State; Formats: CD; Notes: Split with Training for Utopia	—
Zao / Luti-Kriss Sampler	Released: 2001; Label: Tooth & Nail/Solid State; Formats: CS; Notes: Split with Luti-Kriss	—
On Wings of Lead / The Rising End	Released: 2003; Label: Roadrunner; Formats: CD; Notes: Split with Bleeding Through	—
Xenephobe	Released: July 10, 2015; Label: Independent; Formats: CD, LP, DL	—
Pyrrhic Victory	Released: November 3, 2017; Label: Observed/Observer Recordings; Formats: CD, LP, DL	11
Zao/Yashira	Released: September 21, 2018; Label: Mind Over Matter; Formats: LP, DL	—
Decoding Transmissions From the Möbius Strip	Released: February 8, 2019; Label: Observed/Observer Recordings; Formats: LP, DL	—
Pillars	Released: June 26, 2026; Label: Observed/Observer Recordings; Formats: LP, DL	—
"—" denotes a recording that did not chart or was not released in that territory.

=== Video albums ===
List of video albums
Title	Album details
The Lesser Lights of Heaven	Released: November 15, 2005; Label: Ferret; Formats: DVD

=== Demo albums ===
List of demo albums
Title	Album details
Author	Released: 1994; Label: Independent; Formats: CD, CS
Sustained	Released: 1995; Label: Independent; Formats: CD, CS

=== Remix albums ===
List of remix albums
Title	Album details
Reformat/Reboot	Released: November 15, 2019; Label: Observed/Observer; Formats: CD, CS, LP, DL, NES

== Songs ==
=== B-sides ===
Year	Song	Notes
N/A	"Within a Dream"	
2002	"Black Coffee"	A cover of a Black Flag song on Black on Black: A Tribute to Black Flag and also on the Japanese release of The Fear Is What Keeps Us Here
2002	"Sancho/Crimson Kroll"	
2003	"21st Century Thriller"	Recorded with Joshua Ashworth vocals for 2003 demo, later re-recorded with different lyrics for The Funeral of God as "The Rising End (The First Prophecy)"
2003	"She's Not Leaving, She's Not Breathing"	Recorded with Joshua Ashworth vocals for 2003 demo, later re-recorded with different lyrics for The Funeral of God as "Praise the War Machine"
2004	"The Romance of the Southern Spirit"	On the Japanese release of The Funeral of God. Later re-recorded for Awake?.
2016	"Drifting Shadows in Walking Dreams"	Released as a free flexi disc with Decibel. Later appeared on Pyrrhic Victory.

=== Compilation appearances ===
Song	Album
"Sancho"	A Testament to Broken Walls
"Black Coffee"	Black on Black: A Tribute to Black Flag
"The Rising End (The First Prophecy)"	Music on the Brain Vol. 2
"Angel Without Wings"	Point Break Vol. 1
"The Last Revelation (The Last Prophecy)"	Progression Through Aggression Vol. 2
"Exchange"	Songs from the Penalty Box
"A Fall Farewell"	Songs from the Penalty Box Vol. 2
"To Think of You Is to Treasure an Absent Memory"	This is Solid State Vol. 1
"Trashcanhands (Keyboard Coward)"	This is Solid State Vol. 2
"The Icarus Complex"	This is Solid State Vol. 3
"Resistance"	This is Solid State Vol. 4
"Ravage Ritual" (disc 1)	Tooth & Nail 10th Anniversary Box Set
"Savannah" (disc 2)	Tooth & Nail 10th Anniversary Box Set
"5 Year Winter" (disc 4)	Tooth & Nail 10th Anniversary Box Set
"Parade of Chaos" (disc 5)	Tooth & Nail 10th Anniversary Box Set
"Repressed" (disc 4)	Tooth & Nail 4th Anniversary Box Set
"The Rising End (The First Prophecy)"	Van's Warped Tour '05
"Circle II The Lustful: If These Scars Could Speak"	Cheapskates- Harder Side
"The Rising End (The First Prophecy)"	New #### Vol. 10
"The Rising End (The First Prophecy)"	Razor: Music from the Cutting Edge (Vol. 7)
"The Rising End (The First Prophecy)"	Under the Gun DVD
"Physician Heal Thyself"	The Best of Taste of Chaos Vol. 2

== Music videos ==
Year	Song	Album
2004	"The Rising End (The First Prophecy)"	The Funeral of God
2006	"My Love, My Love (We've Come Back from the Dead)"	The Fear Is What Keeps Us Here
2017	"Xenophobe"	The Well-Intentioned Virus
2017	"Broken Pact Blues"	The Well-Intentioned Virus
2019	"Transmission 1: I Saw the End"	Decoding Transmissions From the Möbius Strip
