= Pyrrhic victory (disambiguation) =

Pyrrhic victory is a victory at a cost tantamount to defeat.

Pyrrhic victory may also refer to:

- Pyrrhic Victory (album), by Intwine
- Pyrrhic Victory (EP), by Zao
