= Daniel Weyandt =

American vocalist (born 1981)

Dan Weyandt
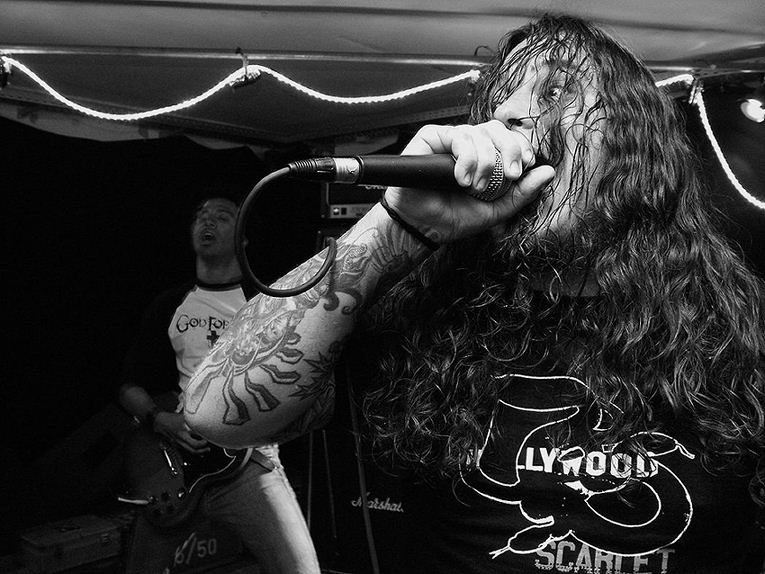
- Weyandt (in front) live with Zao in 2004

Background information
- Born: Daniel Weyandt; May 9, 1981 (age 45)
- Origin: Greensburg, Pennsylvania, U.S.
- Genres: Metalcore, Christian metal (early)
- Occupation: Musician
- Instruments: Vocals, bass guitar
- Years active: 1996–present
- Labels: Solid State, Ferret, Deadself, Haunted, Observed/Observer
- Member of: Zao, Lonely//Ghost//Parade
- Formerly of: Sower, Seasons in the Field

Daniel Weyandt (born May 9, 1981) is the vocalist of the American metalcore band, Zao. He was also the bassist for Seasons in the Field and current bassist for Lonely//Ghost//Parade. Weyandt is also a tattoo artist and owns a shop in his hometown, Greensburg, Pennsylvania.

== History ==
According to Zao's DVD, The Lesser Lights of Heaven, Weyandt started his music career in 1996, with the band Seasons in the Field (previously Sower). The band included friends of Weyandt's, such as guitarist Russ Cogdell, drummer Bob Bigelow, and vocalist Jason Keener. After a while, Bigelow left and was replaced by Stephen Peck. They recorded their split album, Psalms of Ariana with Pensive. Their song, "Eternity" is on the compilation album Blessed be the Killing from Deadself Records. In 1998, Seasons in the Field disbanded, and Weyandt and Cogdell joined Zao. The full line-up consisted of, Jason Keener on lead vocals, Russ Cogdell on guitars, Dan Weyandt on bass and backing vocals, Stephen Peck on drums, Bob Bigelow formerly on drums, and Jeremiah Momper formerly on guitars.

After Seasons in the Field broke up, Weyandt and Cogdell were recruited by drummer Jesse Smith of Zao, along with Brett Detar of Pensive (who later started The Juliana Theory), following Shawn Jonas, Roy Goudy, and Mic Cox leaving. They recorded their Zao debut, and Solid State Records debut, Where Blood and Fire Bring Rest. In 1998, Zao recorded the Training for Utopia / Zao split EP with Training for Utopia. After recording the EP, Detar left, and was replaced by Scott Mellinger (formerly of Creation Is Crucifixion). Bassist Rob Horner joined soon after and they recorded Liberate Te Ex Inferis. In 2001, Cogdell left for a time and the band recorded Self-Titled. Zao "broke-up" in 2001, but later in 2002 they re-formed and recorded Parade of Chaos. In 2004, Cogdell re-joined and they started to write new music, when Jesse Smith and Rob Horner left. Former Seasons in the Field member, Stephen Peck, along with bassist Shawn Koschick joined Zao and the band recorded The Funeral of God. After this Peck and Koschick left the band and were replaced by former Pensive member Martin Lunn and Jeff Gretz of From Autumn to Ashes. On the "Under the Gun Tour" in 2006, Weyandt broke four bones in his left hand. The band had to drop off the tour, due to his injuries.

This line-up recorded The Fear Is What Keeps Us Here and Awake?. After Awake? the band went on five-year unofficial hiatus. In 2010, after Zao took a five-year hiatus, Weyandt, Mellinger, Stephen Peck, and Matt Vo (of Rhetoric) started a project, named Lonely//Ghost//Parade. They have released a single titled "Stand in the Fire" and a Split EP with Feral King. In 2015, the band resurfaced. The bands' debut (non-split) EP, Xenophobe was released on July 10, 2015. The band released their tenth album, The Well-Intentioned Virus on December 9, 2016. On November 3, 2017, the band released their sophomore EP, Pyrrhic Victory on their label Observed/Observer. In 2021, the band released their eleventh studio album, The Crimson Corridor via Observed/Observer.

== Influences ==
Weyandt stated the bands that got him into heavy metal and hardcore punk were Passover, a local band that gained popularity, and Overcome. He states that his five most influential albums include Passover's No Retreat/Passover split, Black Flag's Damaged, Iron Monkey's self-titled, Neurosis's Through Silver in Blood, and Slayer's Seasons in the Abyss.

== Lyrics ==
Weyandt is the primary lyrical composer of Zao. The Blood & Fire songs "Lies of Serpents" and "Ravage Ritual" deal with hypocrisy in the Christian Church, while songs like "To Think of You Is to Treasure an Absent Memory" deal with the death of family and friends. Songs from Liberate such as "Savannah" deals with the suicide of a woman who got in a car accident. The song "If These Scars Could Speak" deals with an ex-girlfriend of Weyandt's being assaulted by a youth pastor. Songs off the upcoming album, The Well Intentioned Virus, deal with the miscarriage of Weyandt's child, fever dreams of Weyandt's personal experience, and a broken suicide pact.

== Religion ==
Weyandt was an outspoken Christian, but in a later interview it was stated that the only Zao member with Christian beliefs was bassist Martin Lunn. According to Scott Mellinger, Weyandt is no longer a Christian but an agnostic but still spiritual.

== Bands ==
Current

- Zao (1997–present)
- Lonely//Ghost//Parade (2010–present)

Former

- Seasons in the Field (1996–1998)

== Discography ==
Sower

- Level Ground on Which to Stand (1996)

Seasons in the Field

- Psalms of Ariana (1997, w/ Pensive)

Zao

See Zao discography

- Where Blood and Fire Bring Rest (1998)
- Liberate Te Ex Inferis (1999)
- Self-Titled (2001)
- Parade of Chaos (2002)
- All Else Failed (2003)
- The Funeral of God (2004)
- The Fear Is What Keeps Us Here (2006)
- Awake? (2009)
- Xenophobe (2015)
- The Well Intentioned Virus (2016)
- Pyrrhic Victory (2017)
- Hide From The Light (2018, w/ Yashira)
- The Crimson Corridor (2021)

Lonely//Ghost//Parade

- "Stand in the Fire" Single (2010)
- Feral King/Lonely Ghost Parade Split EP (2012)

Guest appearances

- "Control is Dead" by As I Lay Dying on their album, Shadows Are Security
- "Bare Your Teeth" by Still Remains on their album, Ceasing to Breathe
- On The Red Shore's album, Unconsecrated
- "This Valentine Ain't No Saint" by The Juliana Theory on their album Deadbeat Sweetheartbeat
- "Witchhunt" by Metavari on the album, Symmetri
- "Skin Crawl" (featuring Bruce Fitzhugh of Living Sacrifice and Brian "Head" Welch of Korn) by Islander on their album It's Not Easy Being Human

As interviewee

- Zao - The Lesser Lights Of Heaven (2005)
- Zao - The Making of The Fear Is What Keeps Us Here (2006)
- Unearth - Alive from the Apocalypse (2008)
