= Emotion Is Dead =

Studio album by The Juliana Theory
- Released: August 29, 2000
- Recorded: February–March 2000
- Studios: Poynter's Palace; The Detar House; Poynter's spare bedroom and living room
- Genres: Alternative rock, emo, pop punk
- Length: 51:21
- Label: Tooth & Nail
- Producers: Barry Poynter; Brett Detar

The Juliana Theory chronology
| Three-Way Split (2000) | Emotion Is Dead (2000) | Music from Another Room (2001) |

Singles from Emotion Is Dead
- 1. "Understand the Dream Is Over" Released: March 26, 2001

Alternative cover
- Red variation of the vinyl cover

Emotion Is Dead is the second studio album by American rock band the Juliana Theory, released on August 29, 2000, on Tooth & Nail Records. While touring in support of their debut studio album Understand This Is a Dream (1999), guitarist Jeremiah Momper was replaced by Joshua Kosker of Dawson High. Shortly afterwards, the band had begun writing material for the follow-up album. In February and March 2000, the band recorded their next album, with producers Barry Poynter and frontman Brett Detar, at Poynter's Palace in Little Rock, Arkansas, The Detar House, and Poynter's spare bedroom and living room. Described as an alternative rock and emo release, Emotion Is Dead took elements from Iron Maiden, Radiohead, and the Smashing Pumpkins.

Emotion Is Dead received favorable reviews from music critics, many of whom commented on the dynamic sound. As of 2003, the album and Understand This Is a Dream had sold a combined 150,000 copies. Preceded by a few tours of the United States, the release of Emotion Is Dead was promoted with a Us tour in October and November 2000, and an east coast tour in early 2001. "Understand the Dream Is Over" was released as the album's lead single on March 26, 2001. Following this, the band tour with the likes of Squad Five-O, the Benjamins and Showoff, before appearing on the Warped Tour for two weeks. Live 10.13.2001, a live album recorded during the album's touring cycle, was released in 2003. The Juliana Theory celebrated the album's 10th anniversary with two celebratory performances in 2010.

== Background and production ==
The Juliana Theory released their debut album Understand This Is a Dream in March 1999 through independent Christian label Tooth & Nail Records. It was promoted with cross-country tour of the United States in mid-1999, which included a supporting slot for Elliott. In August, at the end of the tour, the band were forced to cancel a week's worth of shows due to guitarist Jeremiah Momper leaving; he was temporarily replaced by Joshua Kosker of Dawson High. Later in the month, the band said they were in the process of writing material for their next album, which they expected to title Emotion Is Dead. While writing, the band listened to a lot classic rock acts. They aimed to move away from the punk rock-esque nature of their debut, the songs on which frontman Brett Detar felt were too similar, by writing with keyboards.

In September 1999, the band supported Sense Field on their tour of the US. Kosker was made an official member in October, prior to a two-month headlining US tour. In January 2000, One Day Savior Records released a three with split between the Juliana Theory, Onelinedrawing and Grey AM; the Juliana Theory contributed "If I Told You This Was Killing Me, Would You Stop?" and "Variations on a Theme", both of which had been recorded a year prior. That same month, the band had finished writing and were in the process of making demos at Detar's house. Despite the group not being a Christian act, Tooth & Nail offered them a bigger recording budget for their next album if the band let them sell the release in Christian book stores. Detar's response: "Yeah we’re gonna take the smaller budget."

The Juliana Theory spent five weeks between February 8 and March 23, 2000, recording Emotion Is Dead, with Barry Poynter and Detar co-producing the sessions. Poynter also served as the main engineer, alongside secondary engineer Jason Magnusson. Brandon Ebel, founder of Tooth & Nail, funded the sessions, and acted as an executive producer. The Juliana Theory recorded with both digital and analogue recording equipment at Poynter's Palace in Little Rock, Arkansas. Detar recorded "Emotion Is Dead Pt.II" at The Detar House, and Magnusson recorded "Something Isn't Right Here" in Poynter's spare bedroom and living room. Poynter and Magnusson mixed the recordings, with advice from Detar and Alan, onto DAT at Poynter's Palace. Brian Gardner mastered the album at Bernie Grundman Mastering.

== Composition ==
=== Overview ===
Emotion Is Dead is an alternative rock and emo release, which saw the group incorporate vocal harmonies and influences from pop music, this in turn helped set them apart from their peers in the emo scene. It combined the alternative rock stylings of the Smashing Pumpkins, alongside guitar harmonies in the vein of Iron Maiden and Radiohead-indebted experimentation. Detar said they became limited by the original intentions of writing uptempo post-punk songs; when it came time to write for Emotion Is Dead, they wanted to take influences from other bands they liked, namely Kent, Pink Floyd, and Radiohead. The band combined alternative drumming patterns with pop-esque punk rock, soft ballads and touches of new wave. Its usage of drum machines – spurred on by listening to albums by DJ Shadow and Dr. Dre – and hooks earned it a comparison to Clarity (1999) by Jimmy Eat World.

In addition to their regular roles as bassist and guitarist respectively, Chad Allan and Kosker provided additional percussion throughout the album; Detar also added keyboards and programming, and drummer Neil Herbank contributed additional vocals. Though some of the record is based in pop rock, it featured some heavier tracks, namely "To the Tune of 5,000 Screaming Children" and "Is Patience Still Waiting?". The majority of the songs follow the structure of quiet verses and loud choruses; Detar utilizes screaming on a few tracks. Discussing the album's title, Detar explained: "There's not a lot of feeling in popular music right now. Everybody's buying into music that's completely created in a factory." Lyrical, it tackles the topics of alienation, loss, love and isolation, as well as some Christian themes. Magnusson contributed tambourines, shakers, jingle bells, and various assorted percussion to a few of the tracks; Jeff Jurciukonis played strings on various songs.

=== Tracks ===
The first two tracks, "Into the Dark" and "Don't Push Love Away", start with verse sections in a minor key that later give way to anthemic power chords. "To the Tune of 5,000 Screaming Children" is about giving the middle finger to the group's critics. "We're at the Top of the World (To the Simple Two)" talks about the state of euphoria a person is in after spending time with a girl he admires. Its chorus section consists of "sha la la", and ends with a string section. The track, along with "If I Told You This Was Killing Me, Would You Stop?", were compared to Our Lady Peace and Silverchair. "Is Patience Still Waiting?" is a slower song that was suggested to be about a friend waiting for Jesus Christ. It is followed by part one of a two-part instrumental, "Emotion Is Dead Pt.I", which was attempting to emulate DJ Shadow and Unkle, according to Detar.

The upbeat number "If I Told You This Was Killing Me, Would You Stop?" discusses a backstabbing friend. Slower song "We're Nothing Without You" is followed by the emo pop track "Something Isn't Right Here". "Understand the Dream Is Over" was reminiscent of the sound of the group's debut. "This Is Your Life" initially begins slowly before picking up speed during its first quarter. The penultimate track "You Always Say Goodnight, Goodnight" is a piano-centred ballad that lasts for nine-and-a-half minutes. It features acoustic guitar work and electronic drum beats (programmed by Magnusson), which crescendos into more guitar parts and supplementary vocals from Brenda Tharp. Detar felt it was their attempt at making something Pink Floyd-esque. It leads into the final track, the second instrumental "Emotion Is Dead Pt.II", which featured additional bass guitar playing from Detar.

== Release ==
In April 2000, the Juliana Theory went on two two-week tours back-to-back, before touring with Sri and the Operation on the east coast. The Juliana Theory toured across the US in July and August; they played with River City High and the Stryder, Now She's Gone, and the Operation on various parts of the tour. Emotion Is Dead was released on August 29, 2000, through Tooth & Nail Records. The artwork features model Tiffany Jack, and was taken by Rose Wind Jerome in Melbourne, Florida. The band held an album release show on September 29; it was followed by an October and November tour, and included an appearance at the CMJ Music Marathon festival. The band toured the east coast in January 2001; "Understand the Dream Is Over" was released as the album's lead single on March 26, 2001. In April and May, they toured the US with Squad Five-O, which was followed by a US tour with the Benjamins, Lucky Boys Confusion, and Showoff, and two weeks on the Warped Tour in July.

Emotion Is Dead was released in Japan on March 6, 2002, through Howling Bull Entertainment, and included the bonus track "This Is the End of Your Life". A live album, recorded in October 2001 and titled Live 10.13.2001, was released in August 2003. Alan said the label had an option in the band's contract to release a live album whenever they wanted. He mentioned that the band could pick any show they wished. Six of the album's tracks – namely, "If I Told You This Was Killing Me, Would You Stop?", "Into the Dark", "To the Tune of 5,000 Screaming Children", "Is Patience Still Waiting?", "We're at the Top of the World (To the Simple Two)" and "You Always Say Goodnight, Goodnight" – were released on the compilation album A Small Noise by Tooth & Nail after the group's break-up in 2006. In 2010, the group reunited to play two celebratory 10th anniversary shows for the album. To coincide with the band's 20th anniversary tour in 2017, Emotion Is Dead was re-pressed on vinyl.

== Reception ==
Professional ratings
Review scores
| Source | Rating |
|---|---|
| AllMusic | 3/5 stars |
| CMJ New Music Monthly | Favorable |
| Cross Rhythms | 8/10 stars |
| Exclaim! | Favorable |
| Jesus Freak Hideout | 4/5 stars |
| Punknews.org | 2.5/5 stars |
| Ultimate Guitar | 10/10 |

Emotion Is Dead was met with generally favorable reviews from music critics. The staff at Ultimate Guitar said it had "something for everyone; rock riffs, emo lyrics, [and] melodic rhythm". They noted that it was "very angry, but with a few slower more gentle songs." They added that the emotion that Detar "puts into his songs takes you to a whole new level in musical bliss." James Stafford of Cross Rhythms asked: "How can you describe this? It's rock, pop, alternative. The point is, it has so much to it." He went on to add that "[s]ometimes it's gentle, sometimes frantic, soft then heavy. It is eclectic, but in a good way - it's versatile." Jesus Freak Hideout staff member Kevin Chamberlin said that "[o]ne of the things that's great about the album is that they break free from the stereo-typical emo-punk genre". He found the album to be "much better" than their debut.

Tanner Cusick of CMJ New Music Monthly wrote that the Juliana Theory's sound was "most engaging when some of the gloss is stripped away and a punkier edge is allowed to jut through". He said that if it was "possible to subtract the insipid elements from Third Eye Blind and modern Goo Goo Dolls and med their good parts, Emotion Is Dead might be the shiny, cohesive result. AllMusic reviewer Steve Losey wrote that the band "embraced vocal harmonies and pop flourishes, fashioning a sound that helped distinguish their band from the rest of the burgeoning emo scene." Exclaim! writer Michael Edwards. found it to be "more upbeat, almost jolly emo that skirts around the edges of that classification without truly committing to it." He mentioned that while they "do tend to rely on the same tricks again and again on every song", it was "hardly a criticism unique to this band." Punknews.org staff member Scott Heisel called it "just a very poppy rock record." He added that the album's first half was filled with "buoyant melodies that draw you in", while the second half "seems like its all filler." In a dismissive review from Punk Planet, writer Russell Etchen saw it as a highly "diverse album, ranging from Creed-like ballad crooning to Refused-like screaming [...] This band will probably be huge, and that makes me so, so sad".

Prior to the release of the band's third studio album, Love, in 2003, Understand This Is a Dream and Emotion Is Dead had reportedly sold over 150,000 copies combined.

The 2023 Australian film Emotion Is Dead took its name from the album.

== Track listing ==
All music written by the Juliana Theory, all lyrics by Brett Detar, except where noted. All recordings produced by Barry Poynter and Detar.

Emotion Is Dead track listing
| No. | Title | Lyrics | Length |
|---|---|---|---|
| 1. | "Into the Dark" | | 4:03 |
| 2. | "Don't Push Love Away" | | 3:17 |
| 3. | "To the Tune of 5,000 Screaming Children" | | 3:52 |
| 4. | "We're at the Top of the World (To the Simple Two)" | | 3:17 |
| 5. | "Is Patience Still Waiting?" | | 3:51 |
| 6. | "Emotion Is Dead Pt.I" | | 2:04 |
| 7. | "If I Told You This Was Killing Me, Would You Stop?" | | 3:52 |
| 8. | "We're Nothing Without You" | | 4:14 |
| 9. | "Something Isn't Right Here" | Detar; Joshua Kosker; Chad Alan | 2:07 |
| 10. | "Understand the Dream Is Over" | | 2:56 |
| 11. | "This Is Your Life" | Detar; Alan | 3:35 |
| 12. | "You Always Say Goodnight, Goodnight" | | 9:30 |
| 13. | "Emotion Is Dead Pt.II" | | 4:45 |
| Total length: | | | 51:21 |

== Personnel ==
Personnel per booklet.

The Juliana Theory

- Brett Detar – lead vocals, backing vocals, electric guitars, acoustic guitars, keyboards, key programming, drum programming, sequencing, sampling, additional percussion, additional bass guitar (track 13)
- Chad Alan – electric bass guitars, backing vocals, additional percussion
- Joshua Fiedler – electric guitars, acoustic guitars, backing vocals
- Joshua Kosker – electric guitars, acoustic guitars, backing vocals, additional percussion
- Neil Herbank – drums, ethnic percussion, various additional percussion, additional vocals

Additional musicians

- Jason Magnusson – tambourines, shakers, jingle bells, various assorted percussion, programming additional electronic drums (track 12)
- Brenda Tharp – supplementary vocals (track 12)
- Jeff Jurciukonis – strings

Production and design

- Barry Poynter – producer, engineer, recording (track 13)
- Brett Detar – producer
- Jason Magnusson – second engineer, recording (track 9)
- Brian Gardner – mastering
- Camilla Slertman – band photography
- Rose Wind Jerome – cover girl photography
- Tiffany Jack – cover girl
- Brandon Ebel – executive producer
