= Deadbeat Sweetheartbeat =

Studio album by The Juliana Theory
- Released: September 13, 2005
- Recorded: Late 2004
- Studios: Seedy Underbelly, Valley Village, California
- Genres: Emo, alternative rock, indie rock
- Length: 48:41
- Labels: Abacus, Paper Fist
- Producers: John Travis, Brett Detar

The Juliana Theory chronology
Love (2003)	Deadbeat Sweetheartbeat (2005)	A Small Noise (2006)

Deadbeat Sweetheartbeat is the fourth studio album by Greensburg, Pennsylvania, indie rock band the Juliana Theory. The album was released on September 13, 2005.

== Background and production ==
The Juliana Theory released their third album Love in February 2003 through major label Epic Records. Within a few weeks of its release, as the group were readying themselves for media promotion for MTV and radio, the label informed them: "The record's dead." Frontman Brett Detar said the label viewed it as "dead before it came out" due to it leaking seven months prior. In addition to people at the label who championed the band had left or were fired, the label focused their efforts on Jennifer Lopez and Good Charlotte instead. Detar felt the Juliana Theory could not compete with those other acts. The band's contract had an out-clause, which meant they didn't have to give the label another album and the label still had to pay the band. They used this money to fund the creation of their next album. Undeterred by the situation, the group were in the process of writing new material for a new album by April, and aimed to release it in the following year. They recorded some demos at home in June 2003. In September, Detar described the new material as "a lot more raw and energetic" and "like The Juliana Theory on speed".

In June 2004, the band announced that their next album would be released jointly between their own label Paper Fist Recordings and Rykodisc. By this band, they had accumulated 30 songs for it. Around this time, the band debuted several new songs during their performances, namely "French Kiss Off", "Temptations with a Sharp Dagger" and "Opposite Parallel Poles". Towards the end of the 2004, the group started recording the follow-up to Love. Sessions were held at Seedy Underbelly Studios in Valley Village, California. They recorded around 85% of the album live-in-the-studio; Detar said they wished to capture a performance that was representative of their live show. According to Detar, the final mixes make the album sound "like a rock record with the guitars extremely loud and the vocals are kind of quiet".

== Composition ==
Deadbeat Sweetheartbeat mixed the experimentation of the group's preceding releases into its progressive rock sound. The lyrics tackles the themes of saying goodbye to partners, bad relationships and towns. Detar explained it was "basically a goodbye album, a farewell record. It’s one long series of goodbyes after another, except they aren’t sappy, sad goodbyes. Most of them are good riddance type of goodbyes." At the time, Detar bassist Chad Alan were dealing with relationship issues, alongside the fallout with Epic Records. Detar's vocals were reminiscent of Billy Squier. "This Is a Lovesong... For the Loveless" was compared to Coldplay, and is followed by the emo song "We Make That Road by Walking". "Shotgun Serenade" is a heavier-sounding track about reconciliation. "Leave Like a Ghost (Drive Away)" is about leaving a small town. Detar said "I Love You to Death (Drive Safe)" served as a "lullaby for the end of the world". Detar's vocals in "The Final Song" evokes Holly Johnson.

== Release ==
In March and April 2005, the Juliana Theory toured across the US with Open Hand. On July 13, 2005, Deadbeat Sweetheartbeat was announced for release in two months' time through Abacus Records instead. In August and September 2005, the band went on a headlining US tour, with support from Lovedrug, Days Away and the Goodwill. Deadbeat Sweetheartbeat was released on September 13, 2005 as a joint release between Abacus Records and Paper Fist Records. The artwork recalled the Beatles' self-titled album (1968). It also includes a bonus DVD which features the making of the album and four bonus tracks. During the same month, "This Is a Lovesong... For the Loveless" was released to modern rock radio stations. Detar said Abacus did more for the band in terms of promotion than their previous labels had, citing TV advertisements and international distribution.

Two in-store events were held to promote the album's release, which was followed by a headlining US tour in October and November 2005, with support from JamisonParker, June and We Are the Fury. The Juliana Theory collaborated with the Instant Live service which would allow the band's performances to be made available to fans at the conclusion of the show. Recordings of the San Luis Obispo, Anaheim, Tempe, and Tucson shows were released in this manner. Deadbeat Sweetheartbeat was released in Europe on November 18, 2005. The group played a few shows in the UK in January 2006 as part of their European tour with Haste the Day. Some of the shows featured Turmoil and Most Precious Blood. Later in the month, they played their final show in Germany before announced their break-up two months later.

On August 19, 2016, American record label Mind Over Matter Records re-issued the album as a double LP with four bonus tracks.

== Reception ==
Professional ratings
Review scores
Source	Rating
laut.de	3/5 stars
Melodic	3.5/5 stars
Metal.de	7/10
Ox-Fanzine	8/10

Kaj Roth of Melodic said it was their "most energetic" release, and found it "a little better" than Love. The album was a "a giant smorgasbord of anthemic rock", with "French Kiss Off" and "Her Velvet Voice" being branded as "nothing but filler". Metal.de's Florian Schörg said Detar's vocals "skilfully walking the fine line between kitsch and tearfulness." Despite one "or the other fountain pen has sneaked in between mostly high-quality song material," he'd "warmly" recommend the release to "every emo fan." He complimented the "earthy and pleasantly rocking" production, and found that the majority of the tracks didn't wane with repeated listens. The staff at Impact Press said the majority of the tracks "teeters on the verge of breaking down in one form of another over some solid musical backdrops". Michael Edele of laut.de said some people could "blame the band for the fact that their melodies are a little too poppy and maybe too sweet".

Ox-Fanzine writer Thomas Eberhardt found the material "very mature" musically, with the addition of the keyboard making it seem like a "dreamy, but also very stirring affair." He praised Detar's "characteristic and empathetic" vocals for adding "the uniqueness of the group as always." Emily L. Mullin of Pittsburgh Post-Gazette the opening track set the stage for the remainder of the record with its "catchy, upbeat" sound, and "[a]fter that, the songs flow well and fit together". She praised Detar's voice as being "powerful, almost haunting at times." Miami New Times's Jonathan Garrett said it was "an unapologetically white-knuckled take" on their usual sound, however, it had "weak underlying hooks and occasionally embarrassing lyrics".

== Track listing ==
All lyrics are written by Brett Detar, except where noted; all music is composed by The Juliana Theory.

No.	Title	Length
1.	"This Is a Lovesong... For the Loveless"	3:36
2.	"We Make the Road by Walking"	3:52
3.	"Shotgun Serenade" (Detar, Chad Alan)	4:11
4.	"Leave Like a Ghost (Drive Away)"	3:45
5.	"My Heart Is a Soldier"	3:20
6.	"I Love You to Death (Drive Safe)" (Detar, Alan)	3:52
7.	"This Valentine Ain't No Saint"	3:49
8.	"10,000 Questions"	3:59
9.	"The Final Song"	4:11
10.	"French Kiss Off"	14:06
Total length:		48:41

Bonus DVD
No.	Title	Length
1.	"Making the Album"	25:41
2.	"Over the Earth" (music track)	5:19
3.	"Slowly Flying Solo" (music track)	3:20
4.	"Opposite Parallel Poles" (music track)	3:35
5.	"Can't Suspend It" (music track)	3:58
6.	"Driving with Brett"	10:04
7.	"The Ghost of Jeff Porcaro"	5:33
8.	"The Making of Loopy"	8:34

== Personnel ==
The Juliana Theory

- Brett Detar – vocal, guitar producer, art direction, vocal engineer
- Joshua Fielder – guitar, backing vocal
- Joshua Kosker – guitar
- Chad Allan – bass, backing vocal
- Josh "Chip" Walters – drum

Additional

- Chris Athens – mastering
- Matty Baratto – guitar technician
- George Bardell – assistant
- Joe Barresi – mixing
- Atom Greenspan – percussion, assistant
- Josh Karchmer – executive producer
- Jason Magnusson – percussion, engineer
- Kris McCaddon – art direction, design, illustrations
- June Murakawa – assistant
- Sean O'Keefe – engineer
- Sean Stockham – assistant, drum technician
- John Travis – producer, engineer
- Daniel Weyandt – additional vocals (track 7)
- Steve Wilson – percussion, engineer
