= Music from Another Room (EP) =

EP by The Juliana Theory
- Released: October 23, 2001
- Genre: Indie rock
- Label: Tooth & Nail
- Producer: Brett Detar; Barry Poynter

The Juliana Theory chronology
| Emotion Is Dead (2000) | Music from Another Room (2001) | Love (2003) |

Professional ratings
Review scores
| Source | Rating |
|---|---|
| AllMusic | 3/5 stars |

Music from Another Room is an EP recorded by Greensburg, Pennsylvania indie rock band The Juliana Theory, released on October 23, 2001, on Tooth & Nail Records.

== Track listing ==
All lyrics are written by Brett Detar, except where noted; all music is composed by The Juliana Theory.

1. "This Is the End of Your Life" - 5:53
2. "Moments..." - 4:11
3. "In a Fraction" - 1:40
4. "Liability" - 5:23
5. "Breathing by Wires" (Detar, Chad Alan) - 3:51
6. "Piano Song" - 6:33

== Personnel ==
The Juliana Theory

- Brett Detar – lead vocals
- Chad Alan – bass guitar
- Joshua Fielder – guitar
- Joshua Kosker – guitar, backing vocals
- Neil Herbank – drums

Additional musicians

- Gerald Johnson – saxophone (6)
- Jason Magnusson – tambourine

Technical personnel

- Brett Detar – producer, mixing assistant
- Barry Poynter – producer, engineer, editing, mixing
- Jason Magnusson – assistant engineer, mixing assistant
- Brian "Big Bass" Gardner – mastering
