= Bird in the Tangle =

Studio album by Brett Detar
- Released: November 9, 2010
- Genre: Country
- Length: 48:04
- Labels: RavenSong Records, Mind Over Matter Records
- Producer: Brett Detar

Bird in the Tangle is the debut solo album by The Juliana Theory frontman Brett Detar. It was released on November 9, 2010 by RavenSong Records and Mind Over Matter Records.
