= The Juliana Theory / Onelinedrawing / The Grey AM 3 Way Split =

Three-Way Split

EP by The Juliana Theory, Onelinedrawing, The Grey AM
- Released: January 10, 2000
- Genre: Rock, indie rock
- Length: 19:20
- Label: One Day Savior Recordings

The Juliana Theory, Onelinedrawing, The Grey AM chronology
Understand This Is a Dream (1999)	Three-Way Split (2000)	Emotion Is Dead (2000)

Three-Way Split is an extended play (EP) by the indie-rock bands The Juliana Theory, Onelinedrawing and The Grey AM, released on January 10, 2000, on One Day Savior Recordings. The split was originally planned to include New York emo band, Inside, but the band broke up before they could contribute a recording. The split is dedicated to them.

== Track listing ==
Tracks 1–2 were recorded by The Juliana Theory, track 3 was recorded by Onelinedrawing, while tracks 4–5 were recorded by The Grey AM.

1. "If I Told You This Was Killing Me, Would You Stop?"
2. "Variations on a Theme"
3. "Tricky"
4. "Sandbox Hopping in Phoenix"
5. "Fire Breather"
