= Roger Peterson (musician) =

Aruban-Dutch musician (born 1980)

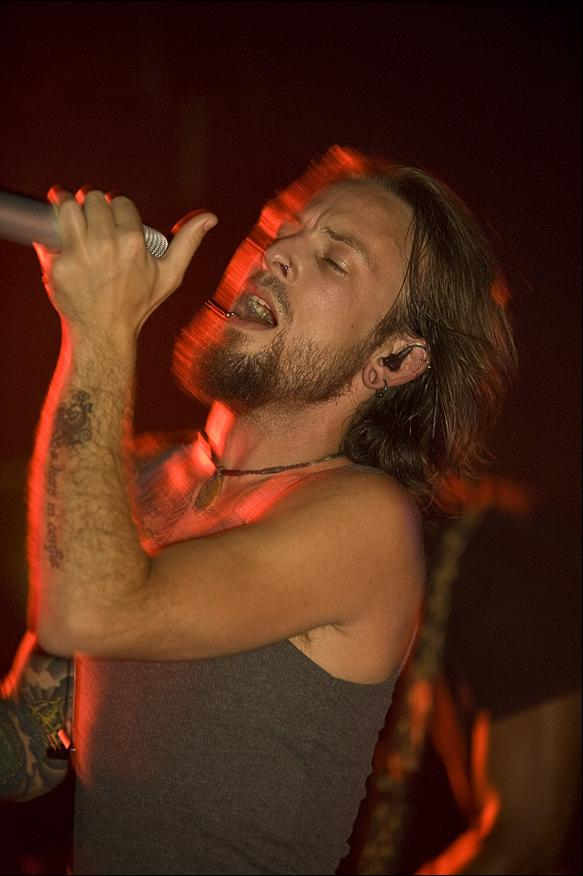
- Roger Peterson performing with Intwine at Underground Cologne on 14 August 2009.

Background information
- Born: Roger Francis Peterson; 1 December 1980 (age 45); Savaneta, Aruba
- Genres: Alternative metal, alternative rock, post-grunge, reggae rock
- Occupations: Musician, songwriter
- Instruments: Vocals, guitar, drums, bass guitar, piano
- Years active: 2000–present
- Labels: Tiefdruck-Musik, INterTWINE, V2, Dureco

Roger Francis Peterson (born 1 December 1980) is an Aruban-Dutch musician. He is known as the lead vocalist for the now-defunct rock band Intwine, which was active from 2001 to 2010. He also was a competitor on the first season of Dutch talent show Idols.

== Biography ==
=== Early life ===
Roger Peterson was born in Savaneta to an Aruba-born father and a Curaçao-born mother. He grew up in the area of Savaneta and San Nicolaas. He has an elder brother named Ryan.

At the age of six Peterson sang in a local church choir. He was fifteen years old when he drummed in a britpop band called Moose and a nu metal band named Lemonbong. With a fellow band member of Moose he started a new group named Alias, in which Peterson served as a vocalist. With Alias he performed at clubs well known on Aruba, such as The Cellar and Black Hog Saloon. Subsequently he met guitarist Martin Buitenweg, with whom he formed R&M. The duo performed at the Chaos Cafe and released an album titled The R&M Project in 2000. Four songs of the album were hits on Aruban radio and one of these songs topped the Aruban charts for seven weeks.

=== Rockacademie ===
After graduating at the Colegio Arubano Peterson moved to the Netherlands in early 2000 to study sociology initially. However, he soon decided that he wanted to make a career in music and managed to get approved as a student at the Fontys Rockacademie of Tilburg. There he met guitarist Jacob Streefkerk and bassist Edsel "Touché" Eusebius, who are both from the island of Sint Maarten. All three joined the roots reggae band Orange Grove, fronted by Michael Maidwell. Peterson served as the second vocalist for Orange Grove and performed with the group at several Dutch music venues and also on Sint Maarten. While they had their activities at Orange Grove, Peterson, Streefkerk and Eusebius decided to start their own band, and with fellow students Erwin Gielen (drums) and Kevin Hissink (guitar) they set up Intwine.

=== Idols ===
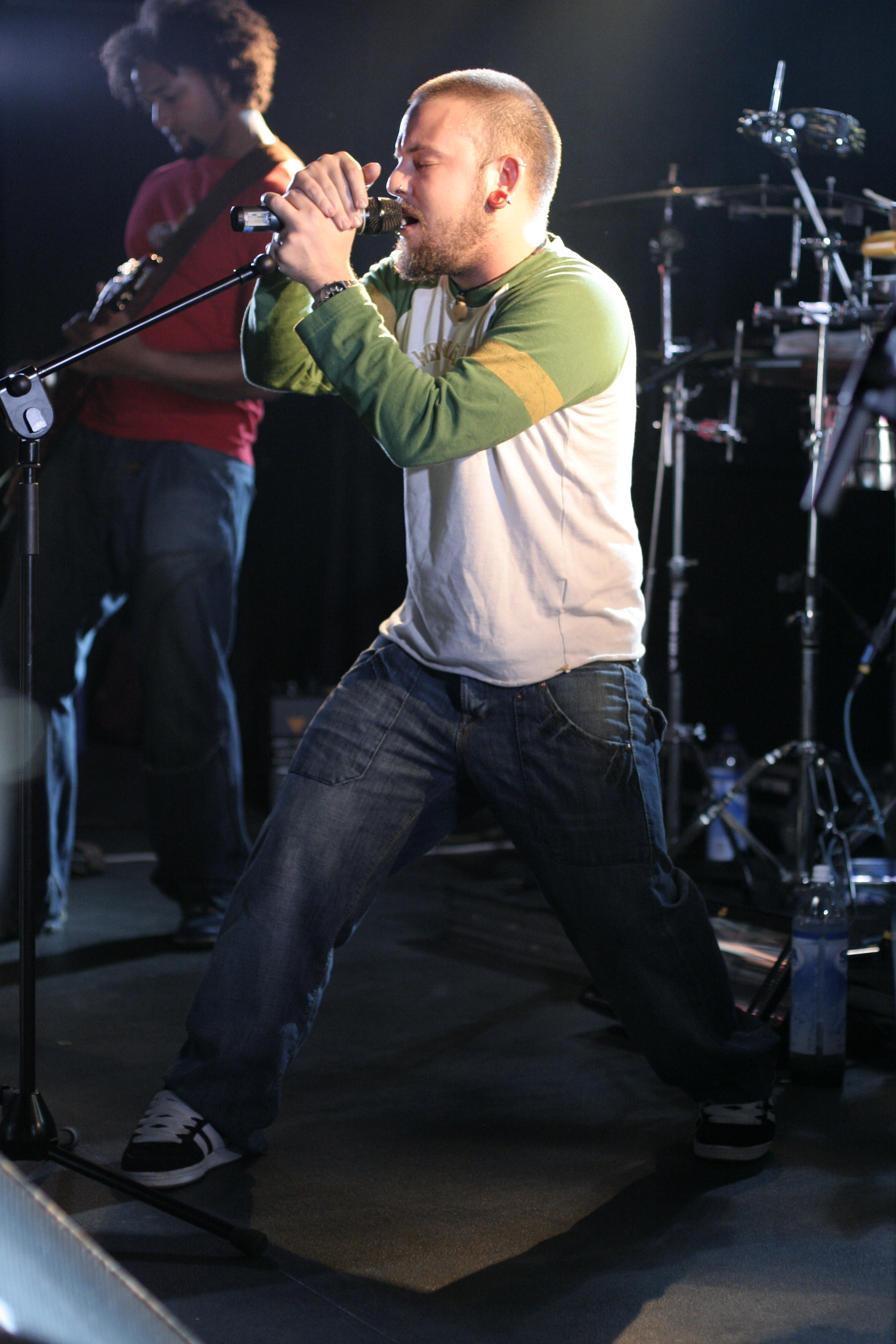
Roger Peterson and guitarist Jacob Streefkerk (left) performing with Intwine in April 2006.

In 2002, Peterson was a participant on the first season of Idols, the Dutch spin-off of the Pop Idol television series. He successfully auditioned with Edwin McCain's "I'll Be". Singing Stevie Wonder's "Isn't She Lovely?", Train's "Drops of Jupiter", and U2's "One" in the subsequent rounds, he managed to qualify for the live shows as one of the remaining ten finalists. Peterson, however, refused to sign the contract that required him for participating in the finals, because it would prohibit him from recording his own songs and with his own band after the end of the series. Because of this, Peterson was forced to withdraw from the show. His performances in Idols, nonetheless, spawned a lot of attention for himself and his band Intwine as well as a recording contract for the group at Dutch label Dureco. Regarding the significance of Idols for Intwine, Peterson said: "The show has been a friend in court for us, but has also been a millstone around our necks. Idols invested a lot in our notoriety and we are grateful for that. However, people relate us with a show that didn't bring anything good. Be honest: that show has flopped."

=== Intwine ===
Intwine's first single "Happy?" reached out for the third position in the Dutch Top 40. Also "Way Out" and "Get Outta My Head", which were spawned by the band's 2003 self-titled debut album as well, hit the Top 40. In 2003 the band was nominated for the TMF Awards and an Edison Award. In 2004, Intwine had their second top-ten hit with "Cruel Man", coming from their second album Perfect. Perfect was awarded with the 3FM Award for best album of the year.

Hereafter, Intwine went through several line-up changes and altered its musical course. The band released Pyrrhic Victory in 2006, on which they sound darker and heavier than on their first two pop rock-orientated albums. Pyrrhic Victory had poor sales, due to financial issues of Intwine's record label V2 Records and the group's decreased notoriety.

In 2007, the band started to play The Rumshop Sessions, where they played acoustic sets in Caribbean styles such as reggae, zouk, cumbia, bolero and soca.

In 2008 Intwine signed to German label Tiefdruck-Musik. The following year they released Kingdom of Contradiction on which they re-recorded earlier songs in a style more similar to nu metal. The album was their first international release and was received with positive reviews in European rock media.

As a result of their Rumshop Sessions concerts, Intwine released an EP titled The Original Acoustic Rumshop Sessions Vol I in June 2010. It appeared to be Intwine's final release, as the group disbanded in October 2010.

=== Back to Aruba ===
After Intwine broke up, Peterson began living permanently on Aruba again. He performs regularly at local Aruban clubs and festivals, playing covers and Intwine songs together with the bands So What! and Roger & the Roosters, among others.

In 2017, Peterson collaborated with former Intwine guitarist Jon Symons. Under the moniker JvR, they released three songs online that summer.

== Trivia ==
- As his major influences Peterson cites Chris Cornell, Deftones, Maná, The Tea Party, A Perfect Circle and Ozomatli.
- In 2007, he sang the song "Touch the Sun" at the Amsterdam Concertgebouw, for the Carmen meets Carmen tribute concert.
- He featured in a 2011 commercial for the Caribbean Mercantile Bank, singing "The Little Drummer Boy".

== Discography ==
=== R&M ===
Studio album:

- The R&M Project (2000)

=== Intwine ===
Studio albums:

- Intwine (Dureco, 2003)
- Perfect (V2, 2004)
- Pyrrhic Victory (V2, 2006)
- Kingdom of Contradiction (Tiefdruck-Musik/Universal, 2009)

=== Collaborations ===
- "Can't You See" of The Color Between Black and White by Absent Minded (2006)
- "Deaf, Dumb and Blind" of I by Cilvaringz (2007)
- "It Is What It Is" by Jeon (2016)
- "Under the Same Sun" by JvR (2017)
- "Precious Light" by JvR (2017)
- "Ambiology" by JvR (2017)
