= Love (The Juliana Theory album) =

Studio album by The Juliana Theory
- Released: February 4, 2003
- Recorded: Early 2002
- Studios: The Site; Sausalito Sound; Lightning Tiger; Brett Detar's basement and bedroom
- Genre: Alternative rock
- Length: 59:22
- Label: Epic
- Producers: Jerry Harrison; Brett Detar (co.)

The Juliana Theory chronology
Music from Another Room (2001)	Love (2003)	Deadbeat Sweetheartbeat (2005)

Love is the third studio album by American rock band the Juliana Theory. It was released on February 4, 2003, through Epic Records. After signing to that label in mid-2001, the band connected with Jerry Harrison, and began recording their next album in early 2002. Harrison and the Juliana Theory frontman Brett Detar produced the sessions; recording was held at The Site in Nicasio, California, Sausalito Sound in Sausalito, California, Lightning Tiger Studios in San Rafael, California, and Detar's basement and bedroom in Greensburg, Pennsylvania. Described as an alternative rock release, the album saw the band shift away from the emo sound of their past albums.

== Background ==
The Juliana Theory released their first two albums Understand This Is a Dream (in March 1999) and Emotion Is Dead (in August 2000) through independent Christian label Tooth & Nail Records. Frontman Brett Detar said they signed "a horrendous deal" with the label. The band hired Lounder Than Bombs Management to aid them in securing a major label contract. The success of both albums (combined sales of over 100,000 copies) attracted attention from labels in mid-2001; staff from the companies appeared the group's shows. In June 2001, they signed a five-album contract with Sony Music Entertainment-imprint Epic Records, as the label was more "understand[ing of] the band", according to Detar. The label had better distribution than Tooth & Nail, which was an issue when the band's music was not available in other markets, such as Canada. They received some backlash from their fans who wished for them to stay independent.

As touring in support of Emotion Is Dead wrapped up in July 2001, the band spent the remainder of the year writing and demoing material for their next album. Around this time, drummer Neil Hebrank left the band; the band worked with two session drummers, before settling on Josh Walter. The members had known him from their childhoods; Walter learned the new material they had been working on and the older tracks quickly. In December 2001, they went on a tour of the North-Eastern US states; partway into the tour, Zao dropped off and was replaced by Piebald. When finding a producer, the band found former Talking Heads keyboardist Jerry Harrison the most enthusiastic. They had attempted to get Butch Vig, who was occupied recording and performing with Garbage, and Metallica producer Bob Rock to no avail. Harrison had seen the band live a handful of times, and liked what he heard. Prior to recording, he spent a week hanging out with the group discussing song arrangements and work on other items, to see how they would interact with him.

== Production ==
They began recording, with Harrison and Detar acting as producers, in early 2002 in California, a mere four weeks after Walter had joined. The bulk of recording was done in two months The Site in Nicasio, California. It was located in the middle of the words; Allen said they intentionally wanted to track in a secluded studio, away from the distractions of a city. Further recording was held at Sausalito Sound in Sausalito, California, Lightning Tiger Studios in San Rafael, California, and Detar's basement and bedroom in Greensburg, Pennsylvania. David Schiffman was the main engineer; Eric Thorngren handled vocal recording. Dave Simon-Baker, Matt Cohen, Kevin Scott, Ari Rios, Andrew Keating, and Jared Miller were assistant engineers; Simon-Baker and Cohen operated Pro Tools, while Lars Fox did additional digital editing.

Love cost $450,000 to make, in contrast to the $6,000 and $10,000 for their debut and Emotion Is Dead respectively. Detar said "a bunch of dumb things" led to them sending that much money. For example, Harrison billed the label $800 on a weekly basis to rent out his Pro Tools rig, which the group used for around four months. By the end of the sessions they bought the rig outright from Harrison. The long period of recording was down to their engineer, who left to adopt a daughter, resulting in the band hiring another engineer. A few of Detar's vocal parts were taken from demo recordings and added to the final studio versions as he perceived he wouldn't be able to best the performance of them, such as a scream on "In Conversation".

On the band's previous releases, Detar would record one vocal take and punch in the odd word or phrase that he felt needed adjusting. For Love, Harrison had him record several vocal takes of each track, and would make a composite of what they felt was the superior performance of each line. Detar said it came across as "way more natural that way, and easier to get a performance that felt and sounded more cohesive." The recordings were mixed in May 2002 by Tom Lord-Alge, with assistance from Femio Hernandez, at South Beach Studios in Miami, Florida. Lord-Alge mixed nearly every track, except for "As It Stands" and "In Conversation", both of which were mixed by Thorngren. Ted Jensen then mastered the album at Sterling Sound in New York City.

== Composition ==
Love is an alternative rock album that saw the group move away from the emo sound of their earlier work, drawing comparison to Audiovent and Jimmy Eat World. In an interview, Detar stated that the album "hopefully [shows] we've grown up a bit and our music reflects the fact that were not just listening to stuff like Jawbreaker anymore. Not that we always were, but you know (...), early on we played stuff that was just post-punk and nothing else, we still love that kind of music, but we just wanna do different stuff."

The album mixed the anthemic nature of Iron Maiden, the pop sound of The Joshua Tree (1987)-era U2, the energy of Sunny Day Real Estate and the melodies of Led Zeppelin guitarist Jimmy Page, alongside incorporated elements of folk rock, hip hop, grunge, power metal and post-punk. Some of the heavier tones were attributed to Waltler, as Detar referred to him as "a much more aggressive player", and could "feel the power ... even on softer stuff [as] he's still laying into the drums pretty hard." Though Detar later attributed that to himself and his past experience in Zao: "I think after I wasn't playing heavy music anymore there was always a part of that that seeped into my writing but it didn't really come into play until this record." Shortly after the album's release, bassist Chad Alan felt that the album was a "little too long" and thought they some of the songs should have been dropped. He also mentioned that they recorded three more songs that were kept off the album.

Discussing the album's title, Alan said the track names on their previous releases were long, and they felt a shorter title would be a better summary of their work. He added that "'love' is a powerful word, and it's [...] the basic meaning of everything that happens in the world, be it positive or negative energy all kind of revolves around love". The lyrics focus on the importance of love in people's lives and the frustrations that accompany it. Alan said the album was a reaction to "a lot of things going on around us in the world." Detar said the record was a better representation of the group's live performances than their earlier releases. Harrison and Schiffman both pushed Detar's vocals "delivery further, and to sing lines as opposed to just play the part. It made the music more expressive and emotional." A second area that the band worked on was incorporating the pop hooks into the three-guitar structure of Detar and guitarists Josh Kosker and Josh Fiedler.

The opening track "Bring It Low" is a riff-centered heavy rock track, followed by "Do You Believe Me?", which tackles trust issues, misunderstanding and self—destruction of one's worth in personal relationships. "Shell of a Man" changes tone three times over the course of its less-than-six minute running time: a slow-building track to a Skid Row-indebted power ballad to a piano coda. "Repeating, Repeating" recalled "Reptile" (1994) by Nine Inch Nails. "Congratulations" deals with the theme of hope, and features two guitar riffs that Detar compared to Zao, and later regretted incorporating them. "Jewel to Sparkle" is a gentle ballad about love; the music for it was the first thing written for the album. "White Days" is a ballad that talks about being able to outlast a snowstorm in the Rocky Mountains. Alan said the band were returning from a gig in Denver, Colorado, "and we almost got in a band accident" on the road. "The Hardest Things" is a piano-centric track; "Trance" is an aggressive talk about life, and is followed by "In Conversation", which discusses breakdowns in communication. "Into the Dark" was originally included on Emotion Is Dead and re-recorded for inclusion on Love; Alan had wanted to re-record "Constellation" from Understand This Is a Dream instead, but "Into the Dark" was chosen as the rest of the band and Epic had wanted it.

== Release ==
In June and July 2002, the Juliana Theory embarked on a US tour with Glassjaw and Piebald; the Rocking Horse Winner, Celebrity, Noise Ratchet, and Coheed and Cambria appeared on select dates. Following this, the band went on another US tour in July and August. On July 16, Love was announced for release in October. In September, the group co-headlining the Great Day festival with the Clarks. In October, the album was delayed till early 2003 due to the group's label and management feeling it would get lost amongst the other releases in the November–December period. The following month, the group embarked on a tour of the UK. "Do You Believe Me?" was picked as the first single; the band had chosen this track, while the label wanted "Repeating, Repeating". Between January and March 2003, the band went on a co-headlining tour of the US with Something Corporate. They were supported by Vendetta Red, Red West and Fiction Plane. The band had to cancel several shows due to Detar suffering from tonsillitis, strep throat, the flu and lead poisoning; six weeks had passed before he made a complete recovery.

Love was eventually released on February 4, 2003; discussing the artwork, Alan said they wanted to convey the "positives and the negatives", and initially had cannons and guns, which were changed to trumpets. Detar said the label considered it "dead before it came out" due to it leaking seven months prior, in addition to people at the label who championed the band had left or were fired. In March 2003, the band went on a Canadian tour with Snapcase and Hopesfall. Following this, they toured with the Ataris and Further Seems Forever on a two-month tour of the US. They then went on a two-week stint with Evanescence, before taking a short break in June 2003. On June 13, 2003, the album was released in Australia through Sony Music Australia. To coincide with this, the group supported One Dollar Short on their national tour in June and July 2003, and then toured throughout Canada until August 2003. In September and October, the band went on a headlining Us tour, with main support from Hopesfall; Count the Stars, Celebrity, and Punchline appeared on select shows. Count the Stars had to drop off some of the shows due to them being involved in a van accident; they were replaced by Unsung Zeros. In March and April 2004, the band went on a cross-country US tour, with Anberlin, Bayside, and Number One Fan. In July 2004, the band appeared at Hellfest. The album was released on vinyl for the first time in 2014.

== Reception ==
Professional ratings
Review scores
Source	Rating
AllMusic	4/5 stars
The Boston Phoenix	1/5 stars
CMJ New Music Report	Favorable
Kludge	8/10
Melodic	3/5 stars
The Phantom Tollbooth	Unfavorable
Rolling Stone	2/5 stars

Love was met with generally favourable reviews from music critics. Greg Olmeda of Kludge said it was a "refreshing new approach" to what the band's fans were used to listening to, as they "seem intent on exploring new musical territory as they readily waver between genres with stunning musical precision." It "delivers the goods, with 14 assorted tracks that will lull you to sleep in one moment, and wake you up the next." The "[c]hurning" guitar work is "easily tamed by ... Detar’s addictively soothing voice." CMJ New Music Report writer Louis Miller said the band "had all of its rough edges polished and buffed into a high-gloss shine" to make it "more consumer-friendly". He found the album was "60 minutes of expert songwriting" with "corpulent guitar-work", and praised the "powerful lilt" of Detar, "whose vocal maneuverings just about force the listen to feel his pangs of loneliness as if they were their own".

AllMusic reviewer Bradley Torreano said the mixture of various bands results in "a melting pot of rock & roll elements that is hard to pin down into any category." He called the collection a "genre-defying album filled with catchy songs that aren't afraid to be brutally heavy one moment just to transition into a gothic beauty the next." Melodic's Johan Wippsson opened his review by calling it their best release. He added that it got better with each listen due to the quality of the tracks and "that they aren't to polished just to suit radio". Rolling Stone negatively called it the "emo-punk version of a Creed album" with the "dark, near-metal riffage, thrashy screeching, big-ass choruses and tenaciously serious poetry". Trae Cadenhead of The Phantom Tollbooth criticized the group as they "tried too hard to reinvent themselves" with there being "nothing independent, raw, or even remotely exciting to be found". The Boston Phoenix writer Mikael Wood said it "confirm[ed] every reservation underground purists have about emo’s commercialization", referring Detar's vocals, the guitar tones and the track structures, "and enough bleeding-heart boilerplate to make Creed blanch".

Love had sold 17,000 copies in the first week of its release. Leading up to the release of Deadbeat Sweetheartbeat (2005), sales of Love had reached over 100,000 copies.

== Track listing ==
All music by the Juliana Theory, all lyrics by Brett Detar, except "Into the Dark", written by Detar, Chad Alan, Joshua Fiedler, Neil Hebrank and Joshua Kosker.

No.	Title	Length
1.	"Bring It Low"	2:49
2.	"Do You Believe Me?"	4:29
3.	"Shell of a Man"	5:41
4.	"Repeating, Repeating"	4:37
5.	"Congratulations"	3:33
6.	"Jewel to Sparkle"	3:44
7.	"White Days"	4:28
8.	"The Hardest Things"	3:45
9.	"DTM"	4:00
10.	"Trance"	4:33
11.	"In Conversation"	5:04
12.	"Into the Dark"	4:10
13.	"As It Stands"	2:18
14.	"Everything"	6:16
Total length:		59:22

Downloadable & vinyl bonus tracks
No.	Title	Length
15.	"Before I Go"
16.	"The Black Page"

== Personnel ==
Personnel per booklet.

The Juliana Theory

- Brett Detar – vocals
- Chad Allan – bass
- Joshua Kosker – guitar
- Joshua Fielder – guitar
- Josh Walter – drums

Production and design

- Jerry Harrison – producer
- Brett Detar – co-producer
- David Schiffman – engineer
- Eric "ET" Thorngren – vocals recording, mixing (tracks 11 and 13)
- Tom Lord-Alge – mixing (all except tracks 11 and 13)
- Femio Hernandez – assistant
- Dave Simon-Baker – assistant engineer, Pro Tools engineer
- Matt Cohen – assistant engineer, Pro Tools engineer
- Lars Fox – additional digital engineer
- Kevin Scott – assistant engineer
- Ari Rios – assistant engineer
- Andrew Keating – assistant engineer
- Jared Miller – assistant engineer
- Ted Jensen – mastering
- P. R. Brown – art direction
- The Juliana Theory – art concept
- Roman Barrett – band photography
