= The Juliana Theory / Dawson High Split =

Studio album (Split) by The Juliana Theory / Dawson High
- Released: October 8, 1998
- Recorded: February 11, 1998 (tracks 1–5); April 29, 1998 (tracks 6–9); May 13, 1999 (track 10)
- Genre: Indie rock emo alternative rock pop punk
- Length: 30:17
- Label: Arise Records
- Producer: The Juliana Theory (Tracks 1-5); Dawson High (Tracks 6-9); Dawson High, Freddy Krumins (Track 10)

The Juliana Theory chronology
The Juliana Theory / Dawson High Split (1998)	Understand This Is a Dream (1999)

Professional ratings
Review scores
Source	Rating
HM Magazine	link

The Juliana Theory / Dawson High is a split album by Greensburg, Pennsylvania-based indie-rock bands The Juliana Theory and Dawson High released in 1998 on Arise Records.

== Track listing ==
The Juliana Theory

1. D.J.
2. Speechless
3. Pictures, Stars And Dreams
4. Infatuation
5. Week Long Embrace

Dawson High

1. Just A Fan
2. I Didn't Mean To Break Your Heart
3. Port Matilda
4. Nice Boy
5. Goodnight Starlight (Demo)
