= Pyrrhic Victory (EP) =

EP by Zao
- Released: November 3, 2017
- Recorded: 2017
- Genre: Metalcore
- Length: 18:34
- Label: Observed/Observer
- Producer: Zao

Zao chronology
The Well-Intentioned Virus (2016)	Pyrrhic Victory (2017)	The Crimson Corridor (2021)

Singles from Pyrrhic Victory
- 1. "Drifting Shadows in Walking Dreams" Released: December 2014; 2. "The Host Has Bared It's Teeth" Released: September 25, 2017; 3. "Clawing, Clawing, Never Cutting Through" Released: October 16, 2017

Professional ratings
Review scores
Source	Rating
Indie Vision Music	4/5 stars
Lambgoat	8/10 stars
New-Transcendence	10/10 stars

Pyrrhic Victory is the sixth EP by American metalcore band Zao, released on November 3, 2017. It is the third release by the band on their own Observed/Observer Recordings label since their reactivation in 2015 after several years of hiatus. The songs were recorded during the same sessions that resulted in 2015's Xenophobe and 2016's The Well-Intentioned Virus. The EP in its entirety was streamed on the Metal Injection website on October 31, 2017.

== Track listing ==
No.	Title	Length
1.	"Drifting Shadows in Walking Dreams"	3:29
2.	"Gifts of Flowers and Stone"	2:58
3.	"Clawing, Clawing, Never Cutting Through"	3:57
4.	"The Host Has Bared Its Teeth"	3:28
5.	"Feed It Pain"	4:42

== Personnel ==
Zao

- Dan Weyandt – vocals
- Scott Mellinger – guitar, vocals
- Russ Cogdell – guitar
- Martin Lunn – bass
- Jeff Gretz – drums

Production

- Matt Kerley – artwork
- Dave Hidek – mixing, engineer
- Garret Haines – mastering
- Ben Buckner – art layout
- Josh Bonati – lacquers

== Charts ==
Chart (2017)	Peak position
Billboard Heatseakers	11
