= Metavari =

American electronic music project

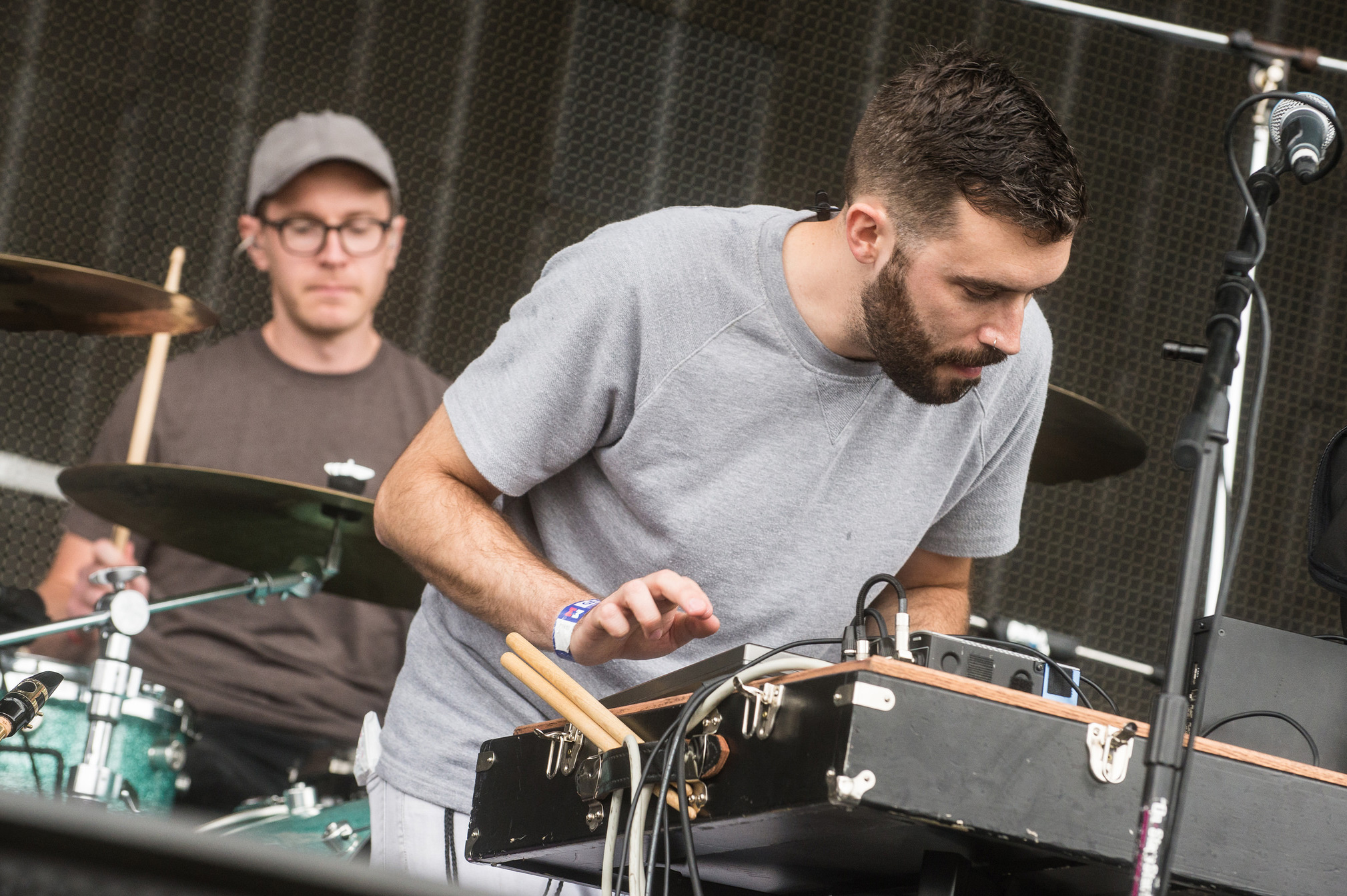
- Metavari performing at the Middle Waves Music Festival, 2016

Background information
- Origin: Fort Wayne, Indiana, United States
- Genres: Electronic, Downtempo, Ambient, Synthwave, Post-rock
- Years active: 2008–Present
- Labels: One Way Static Records, Mind Over Matter Records, Crossroads of America Records, Friend of Mine Records
- Website: metavari.com

Metavari is an American electronic music project led by Nathaniel David Utesch in Fort Wayne, Indiana.

== History ==
From 2008 to 2012, Metavari released two EP's, one full-length, and showcased at the SXSW Music Festival in Austin, Texas, as a post-rock oriented full band. During this time the band shared the stage with many notable acts in the post-rock genre including This Will Destroy You, Maserati, Tortoise, The Appleseed Cast, Lymbyc Systym and other indie groups such as Bear In Heaven, Anamanaguchi and Titus Andronicus.

Metavari launched a Kickstarter in 2012 to fund the release of their sophomore full-length. The record was eventually materialized in 2015 with Nathaniel David Utesch as primary composer and producer, saw their departure from the post-rock genre, and was Metavari's debut as an electronic music project. The crowd-sourced LP is titled, Moonless, and was self-released February 2015.

Since 2015, Metavari has released two records with Mind Over Matter Records (Los Angeles); Oh Diane in September 2015; and Tetra A.D. in February 2017. "Oh Diane" is a tribute to the television series, Twin Peaks, and was featured on the compilation, The Next Peak, Vol III.

Metavari re-scored Fritz Lang's Metropolis as a commission from Fort Wayne, Indiana's Cinema Center for Art House Theater Day 2016. The re-score was released worldwide on One Way Static Records for Record Store Day 2017, and distributed in the United States by Light in the Attic Records. Two years later, Metavari released another official Record Store Day title with One Way Static/Light in the Attic. Titled, ABSURDA, the record was scored to a collection of work spanning the career of David Lynch and doubled as Metavari's fourth studio release.

== Members ==
In addition to Nathaniel, live shows are often accompanied by the bassist from Metavari's original line-up, Ty Brinneman.

List of past and present members and collaborators:

- Nathaniel David Utesch — synths, vocals, programming, alto saxophone, drums
- Ty Brinneman — bass guitar
- Tommy Cutter — guitar, programming
- Simon Lesser — guitar
- Andrew McComas — drums, guitar
- Kyle Steury — guitar, synths, programming
- Colin Boyd — drums, percussion

== Discography ==
=== Albums ===
- Be One of Us and Hear No Noise (2009, Crossroads of America Records)
- Be One of Us and Hear No Noise (Extended Edition) (2009, Friend of Mine Records)
- Moonless (2015, Vital Shores)
- Metropolis (An Original Re-Score by Metavari) (2017, One Way Static Records)
- Symmetri (2017, One Way Static Records)
- ABSURDA (2019, One Way Static Records)

=== EPs ===
- Ambling EP (2008, Self-Released)
- Studies vol.1: Loosen the Bands (2010, Crossroads of America Records)
- Tetra A.D. (2017, Mind Over Matter Records)
- Soft Continuum (2019, Vital Shores)

=== Singles ===
- "Heavy Love" (2014, Vital Shores)
- "See Again" (2014, Vital Shores)
- "Oh Diane" b/w "Josie's Lament (Mill Fire)" (2015, Mind Over Matter Records)
- "Indigo" (2016, Vital Shores)
- "Messages" (2017, One Way Static Records)
- "Witchhunt feat. Daniel Weyandt" (2017, One Way Static Records)
- "The Alphabet" (2019, One Way Static Records)
