= Brett Detar =

American musician

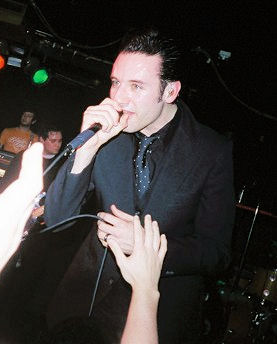
- Brett Detar in 2006

Background information
- Born: Brett Andrew Detar; April 30, 1978 (age 48)
- Origin: Greensburg, Pennsylvania, U.S.
- Genres: Folk music; film score; country; Americana; alternative rock; metalcore (early)
- Occupations: Musician, film composer, songwriter
- Instruments: Vocals, guitar, piano, banjo, bass guitar
- Years active: 1996–2006, 2010-present
- Website: "Brett Detar". Archived from the original on December 26, 2021.

Brett Detar is an American singer, songwriter, film composer, and music producer. He is best known as frontman for the band The Juliana Theory and as former guitarist in Zao and Pensive.

Detar launched a career as a country musician with the release of his debut solo album, Bird in the Tangle.

== Life and career ==
Brett Detar was born April 30, 1978, in Greensburg, Pennsylvania.

He began his musical career as guitarist in the band Pensive, who released an EP called The Subtlety of Silence and a split with EP with fellow Pennsylvania band Seasons In The Field.

In 1997, drummer Jesse Smith recruited Brett to play guitar in the metalcore band Zao. Detar suggested his friend Dan Weyandt come aboard as well. They both appeared on the groundbreaking album Where Blood and Fire Bring Rest and a split CD with Training for Utopia. In 1998, Detar left Zao to pursue what began as a side-project, The Juliana Theory, full-time.

Following the initial dissolution of The Juliana Theory in 2006, Detar moved to Los Angeles and opened a vintage clothing shop and a recording studio. He continued to write songs from time to time. Detar also owned a recording studio in Manhattan, New York called Soho Taxidermy. Afterwards, he began work on a solo country album, which emerged on November 10, 2010, via his website. Bird in the Tangle was supported by a month long tour in 2011, opening for Tiger Army frontman Nick 13. His second solo album, Too Free to Live, followed on October 8, 2013. The same year, he toured the U.S. with Lindi Ortega.

A number of Detar's solo songs have been featured on several television series, including Nashville, Supernatural, Elementary, Jersey Shore, Friendzone,Snooki & Jwoww, Teen Mom, and Party Down South. His songs were also included in episodes of the acclaimed Marvel Television Netflix shows Daredevil, Jessica Jones, and The Punisher.

Detar made his debut as a film composer with Paramount Pictures' The Devil Inside, which opened in North America on January 6, 2012. Detar reunited with writer/director William Brent Bell for FilmDistrict's 2014 action thriller WER, the 2020 horror sequel Brahms: The Boy II, and the 2021 horror film, Separation.

== Discography ==
=== Pensive ===
- The Subtlety of Silence EP (1997)
- The Psalms of Ariana split EP with Seasons In the Field (1998)

=== Zao ===
- Where Blood and Fire Bring Rest (1998)
- The Split EP, split EP with Training For Utopia (1998)

=== The Juliana Theory ===
- Understand This Is A Dream (1999)
- Emotion is Dead (2000)
- Love (2003)
- Deadbeat Sweetheartbeat (2005)
- A Dream Away (2021)

=== Solo Album ===
- Bird in the Tangle (2010)
- Too Free to Live (2013)

== Filmography ==
=== Composer ===
- The Devil Inside (2012)
- WER (2014)
- Brahms: The Boy II (2020)
- Separation (2021)
- Orphan: First Kill (2022)
