= The Juliana Theory =

American emo band

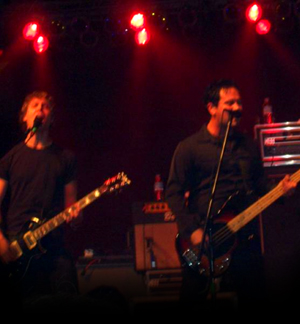
- The Juliana Theory performing in 2010

Background information
- Origin: Greensburg and Latrobe, Pennsylvania, U.S.
- Genres: Emo; emo pop; post-hardcore; alternative rock; indie rock
- Years active: 1997–2006, 2010, 2017, 2020–present
- Labels: Tooth & Nail, Epic, Paper Fist, Abacus, Mightier Than Sword, One Day Savior, Equal Vision, Rude, Mind Over Matter
- Members: Brett Detar; Joshua Fiedler; Ryan Seaman
- Past members: Chad Alan; Joshua Kosker; Jeremiah Momper; Neil Hebrank; Josh "Chip" Walters
- Website: thejulianatheory.com

The Juliana Theory is an American emo band from Greensburg and Latrobe, Pennsylvania. They signed to Tooth & Nail Records, and later to Epic Records for the release of the album Love. They released four studio albums before initially disbanding in 2006. The band has since reunited three times: once in 2010 for eight shows, again in 2017 for a tour celebrating their 20th anniversary, and finally in 2020 when The Juliana Theory announced signing with Equal Vision Records.

The Juliana Theory has cited numerous bands as influences, including the Beatles, the Cure, the Smashing Pumpkins, U2, Rush, Roger Waters, and Pink Floyd.

== History ==
=== Formation ===
The Juliana Theory was formed in 1997 by Joshua Fiedler and Neil Hebrank (formerly of the band Noisome) along with Chad Monticue (former singer for Pensive), Jeremiah Momper, and Brett Detar (who also split his time as a guitarist for Zao and Pensive at the time).

Detar and Monticue were childhood friends while Fiedler met Detar as classmates at a nearby high school. The members formed The Juliana Theory in 1997 as a side-project while they played in other bands. "We really started out as a joke," recalls Detar. "Slowly, we started to like the music we were making in The Juliana Theory more than the music we were making in our regular bands. Eventually, everyone committed to make this their full-time band".

According to an interview on the website Tapout Zine, there was never a real concept behind the band's name. "We used to have an elaborate story that we told involving sociology students and a huge experiment involving music and people's responses to it, but we got tired of telling the story. The band was supposed to be a side project that wouldn't last and we just came up with a name before our first show. It has no meaning at all". In an interview lead singer Brett Detar told Lina Lecaro of the Los Angeles Times that the band's name was "pretty stupid," adding, "Let's just say this: Every band has a name and for better or worse, this is ours".

Their first performance was at a concert at Saint Vincent College booked by Christopher Pecoraro, as an opening act, but their fame grew quickly. They were spotted by Brandon Ebel of Tooth & Nail Records on the Cornerstone Music Festival impromptu stage, which showcased unsigned talent. A split EP with the band Dawson High on Arise Records marked the band's recorded debut. Shortly after The Juliana Theory signed a multi-album deal with Seattle-based Tooth & Nail records.

=== The Tooth & Nail Era ===
After spending time on the road touring, the band signed with the independent record label Tooth & Nail. The label released The Juliana Theory's debut studio album Understand This Is a Dream on March 23, 1999. Around this time Joshua Kosker, originally of the group Dawson High, replaced Momper when he left the band after the band's first album was released. The following year The Juliana Theory and Tooth & Nail released the follow-up record Emotion Is Dead (2000). Together, the albums sold around 130,000 units.

After the release of Emotion Is Dead, Tooth & Nail and The Juliana Theory clashed heads in terms of creative and promotional areas of the group's marketing. "Most things that we asked them to do for us they couldn't do or didn't do. Now, almost everything we asked for at the time is just protocol for the label. They do all of the stuff we wanted them to do back then very well now." The group left to find a new label shortly afterwards.

=== The Epic Era ===
In 2001, the Juliana Theory signed a recording contract with Epic/Sony. Dates on the 2001 Warped Tour followed. On October 23, 2001, The Juliana Theory released six new songs as the Music from Another Room EP on Tooth & Nail Records.

A change in the line up meant that original drummer Neil Hebrank was replaced by Josh "Chip" Walters before the recording of Love, the band's third-full-length album for Epic Records.

Recorded at locations in California and also at lead singer Brett's home Studio at Greensburg, Pennsylvania, Love was produced by Jerry Harrison of Talking Heads who also worked with successful acts Live and No Doubt. Love sold over 100,000 albums with little radio or label support behind it. This led to over 260 tour dates the year of its release and the record debuted on Billboard 200 chart at No. 71 and remained in the top 200 for 5 weeks.

Around the time of the release of Love, the band co-headlined a tour with Something Corporate for tour dates which included New York, Los Angeles and many cities in between. Between January and March 2003 both the Juliana Theory and Something Corporate shared the stage, along with support act Vendetta Red all three groups had moved from independent to major record labels since the release of their previous records.

In a 2003 interview Brett Detar shared his thoughts about the group's time with Sony. "It's not nearly as good as we had hoped," he said. "We've never really had a great time at any record label we've been at".

The band soon parted ways with Epic Records after the release of the Love album and signed a deal with Rykodisc. In a MySpace blog written by Detar, he explains that after a change in management and direction of the label, "...at the last second we wormed our way out of the deal and headed into the studio with our own funds and with the help of Josh Karchmer, our manager."

=== Paper Fist Era ===
Following the separation of the group from Epic Records the band subsequently began their own label affiliated with Abacus Recordings called Paper Fist (in reference to The Juliana Theory song, "To the Tune of 5,000 Screaming Children"). Their fourth studio album Deadbeat Sweetheartbeat was released on September 13, 2005.

Deadbeat Sweetheartbeat was produced and recorded by John Travis and was co-produced by frontman Brett Detar. The album was recorded at Seedy Underbelly Studios, Valley Village California between November and December 2004 and also at Studio 66 in Greensburg, Pennsylvania between the months of December 2004 and January 2005.

The limited edition release of Deadbeat Sweetheartbeat features a 25-minute making of documentary filmed by the band, Jeff Calhoun and Jason Hopkins. In the documentary Brett shared that around 30 pieces of music and 25 complete songs were made in preparation of the finished record.

In the documentary the band claim that the record is driven by the four songs, four pillars which hold the rest of record, the songs they specify include: "This Is a Lovesong... For the Loveless", "This Valentine Aint' No Saint", "French Kiss Off" and "Shotgun Serenade". The DVD also features four previously unreleased exclusive tracks only available with the limited edition set.

Chad shares in regard to the album "I can honestly say we made a record about love, cars, drinking, and drugs and sex and murder, all those things are elements of our record and I think that's pretty cool, what else do you want to listen to?, there's nothing better to listen to". Brett also shares that the record benefits from having "bite and venom" and that "the album lyrically packs a lot more punch".

=== Breakup ===
On February 9, 2006, the band announced they were breaking up. Reasons cited for the group's disbandment include issues with record labels Tooth and Nail and Epic.

=== Post-breakup ===
An official MySpace blog posted on February 8, 2007, gave an update on Josh Fiedler starting new band Vesta and Josh "Chip" Walters playing drums in his new band called Crushing Ground.

An August 16, 2009, Drive By Media story teased that The Juliana Theory may be reforming after comments left by the official Juliana Theory Twitter page suggested "good things are coming. we promise".

On October 5, 2009, former lead singer Brett Detar posted an announcement on his official website that a Juliana Theory Rarities & B-Sides Album was in the works and will be available sometime in the near future.

=== Vesta ===
In 2008 The Juliana Theory members Joshua Fiedler, Joshua Kosker and Chad Alan began writing and recording music with a new band called Vesta. The group played their first show on April 25, 2009, in Bowling Green, Ohio. Around this time the group was working on their first album. The recording was done by Pittsburgh musician and recording engineer, Jonathan Gunnell.

On October 6, 2009, Vesta, released their debut EP independently called 0.1 Daylight's Coming. Once again Gunnell recorded and mixed the release, but mastering was completed by Garrett Haines at Treelady Studios. In 2010, two additional songs were added and the album was released by Paper Fist Recordings.

=== Reunion ===
On December 14, 2009, the band announced that they would be playing two reunion shows in the summer of 2010 to celebrate the 10-year anniversary of Emotion Is Dead.

On January 25, 2010, a New York City show was announced at Highline Ballroom for August 20, 2010. The band played Emotion Is Dead as well as a greatest-hits set.

On March 23, 2010, Mightier Than Sword Records released Understand This Is a Dream on vinyl as the second installment in their 10th Anniversary Series.

In August 2010, the band released a 28-song B-sides and Rarities album for online purchase only.

On September 11, 2010, the band said one final goodnight at The Altar Bar (since closed) in Pittsburgh where they donated all of the ticket sales to the Mario Lemieux Foundation.

On August 19, 2016, American record label Mind Over Matter Records re-issued Deadbeat Sweetheartbeat as a double LP with four bonus tracks.

On April 17, 2017, the band announced a North American summer reunion tour, celebrating their 20th anniversary. The tour also included the Vans Warped Rewind at Sea, sailing from New Orleans to Cozumel October 28 through November 1, 2017.

=== Equal Vision Records Era ===
On November 20, 2020, the band announced they had signed with Equal Vision Records and released new single "Can't Go Home".

On January 1, 2021, The Juliana Theory released a new track titled "Better Now".

They released their first album since 2005, A Dream Away, on March 26, 2021, via Rude/Equal Vision Records, which included "Better Now" as well as re-imagined versions of several earlier hits including "Into the Dark" and "If I Told You This Was Killing Me, Would You Stop?".

In the summer of 2022, The Juliana Theory played select dates on Dashboard Confessional and Andrew McMahon in the Wilderness's Hello Gone Days tour.

In summer 2023, the band toured as an acoustic duo, supporting select dates for The Rocket Summer on their Shadowkasters tour.

== Band members ==
Current

- Brett Detar – lead vocals, rhythm guitar, keyboards, programming (1997–2006, 2010, 2017–present)
- Joshua Fiedler – lead guitar, backing vocals (1997–2006, 2010, 2017–present), bass (2017–present)
- Ryan Seaman – drums (2021–present)

Former

- Chad Alan – bass, backing vocals (1997–2006, 2010, 2017)
- Joshua Kosker – rhythm and lead guitar, backing vocals (1999–2006, 2010, 2017)
- Josh "Chip" Walters – drums (2001–2006, 2010, 2017)
- Jeremiah Momper – rhythm and lead guitar (1997–1999)
- Neil Hebrank – drums (1997–2001)

Timeline

== Discography ==
=== Studio albums ===
List of studio albums, with selected chart positions
Title	Album details	Peak chart positions
Title	Album details	Billboard 200
Understand This Is a Dream	Released: March 23, 1999 (US); Label: Tooth & Nail; Formats: CD, LP, DD	—
Emotion Is Dead	Released: August 29, 2000 (US); Label: Tooth & Nail; Formats: CD, LP, DD	—
Love	Released: February 4, 2003 (US); Label: Epic; Formats: CD, LP, DD	71
Deadbeat Sweetheartbeat	Released: September 13, 2005 (US); Label: Paper Fist, Abacus; Formats: CD, CD+DVD, LP, DD	—
A Dream Away	Released: March 26, 2021 (US); Label: Equal Vision, Rude; Formats:	—

=== Live albums ===
List of live albums
Title	Album details
Live October 13, 2001	Released: August 5, 2003 (US); Label: Tooth & Nail; Formats: CD, DD
Troubadour – West Hollywood, CA 11.3.05	Released: February 14, 2006 (US); Label: Instant Live Rec.; Formats: CD
Scrappy's – Tucson, AZ 11.8.05	Released: February 14, 2006 (US); Label: Instant Live Rec.; Formats: CD
Downtown Brewing Co. – San Luis Obispo, CA 11.2.05	Released: February 14, 2006 (US); Label: Instant Live Rec.; Formats: CD
Neckbeard's – Tempe, AZ 11.7.05	Released: February 14, 2006 (US); Label: Instant Live Rec.; Formats: CD
Chain Reaction – Anaheim, CA 11.5.05	Released: February 14, 2006 (US); Label: Instant Live Rec.; Formats: CD

=== Extended plays ===
List of extended plays
Title	Album details
Music from Another Room	Released: October 23, 2001 (US); Label: Tooth & Nail; Formats: CD, 12", DD
Still The Same Kids Pt. 1	Released: May 6, 2022 (US); Label: Equal Vision Records; Formats: LP, DD

=== Compilation albums ===
List of compilation albums
Title	Album details
A Small Noise	Released: February 7, 2006 (US); Label: Tooth & Nail; Formats: CD, DD
28 B-Sides and Rarities	Released: September 7, 2010 (US); Label: Paper Fist; Formats: DD

=== Split albums ===
List of split albums
Title	Album details
The Juliana Theory / Dawson High	Released: October 8, 1998 (US); Label: Arise; Formats: CD
Three-Way Split	Released: January 10, 2000 (US); Label: One Day Savior; Formats: CD

=== Singles ===
List of singles
Title	Year	Album
"Understand the Dream Is Over"	2001	Emotion Is Dead
"Do You Believe Me?"	2002	Love
"Can't Go Home"	2020	Non-album single
"Better Now"	2021	A Dream Away

=== Other appearances ===
List of other appearances
Title	Year	Album
"Bring It Low"	2002	MTV Road Rules: Don't Make Me Pull This Thing Over – Volume 1
"Can't Suspend It"	2005	Drive-Thru Records and Purevolume.com

=== Music videos ===
Title	Year	Director(s)
"Do You Believe Me?"	2002	
"My Heart Is A Soldier"	2004	
"This Is A Lovesong... For the Loveless"	2005	Travis Kopach
"Can't Go Home"	2020	Brett Detar
"Better Now"	2021	Jesse Korman
"We're At The Top Of The World (Reimagined)"	2021	Jesse Korman
"Playback '99 (Burn The Cassette Deck)"	2022	Jesse Korman
"Less Talk"	2022	Eric Angelo Espiritu
"Constellation"	2024	
