= Intwine =

Dutch rock band

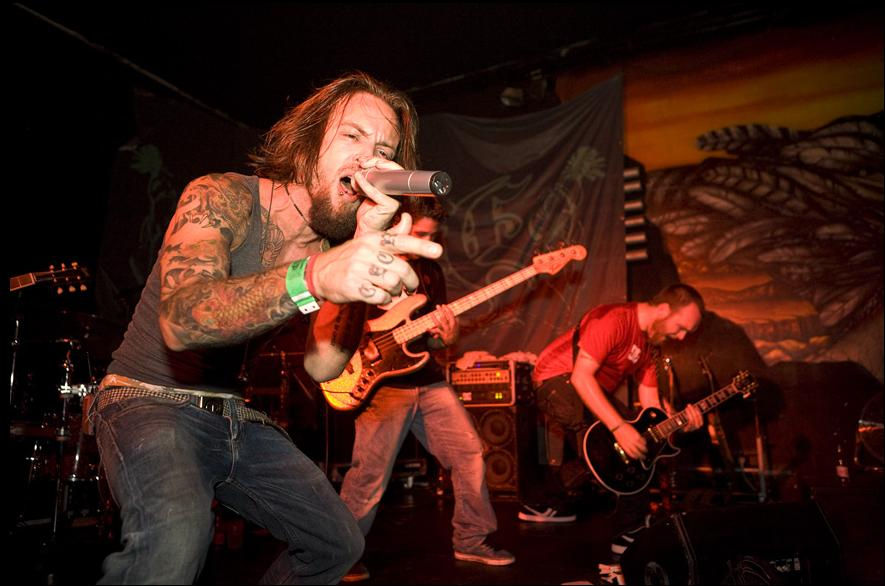
- Intwine performing at Underground Cologne on 14 August 2009

Background information
- Origin: Tilburg, North Brabant, Netherlands
- Genres: Nu metal; alternative metal; reggae metal (later); Post-grunge; hard rock (early)
- Years active: 2001–2010
- Labels: Tiefdruck-Musik/Universal (2008-2010); INterTWINE Records (2007-2010); V2 (2004-2008); Dureco (2002-2004)
- Members: Roger Peterson; Jacob Streefkerk; Jon Symons; Eric Spring in 't Veld
- Past members: Erwin Gielen; Jeremy Bonarriba; Kevin Hissink; Ferdinand van Duuren; Touché Eusebius; Rocheteau Mahuwallan; Pablo Penton
- Website: intwine.nl

Intwine was a Dutch rock band formed in 2001 by five students of the Tilburg Rockacademie.

The band received nationwide notoriety in the Netherlands after lead singer Roger Peterson's participation in the Idols talent show in 2002. Subsequently, Intwine charted the Dutch Top 40 five times, with "Happy?" (#3) and "Cruel Man" (#7) being their major hits. During their nine-year career they released four studio albums: Intwine (2003), Perfect (2004), Pyrrhic Victory (2006) and Kingdom of Contradiction (2009).

On 16 October 2010 Intwine revealed their breakup through its website. The group's last line-up consisted of Roger Peterson (vocals), Jacob Streefkerk (guitar), Jon Symons (guitar) and Eric Spring in 't Veld (drums).

== History ==
=== Formation ===
Guitarist Jacob Streefkerk and bassist Touché Eusebius were childhood friends at the island of Sint Maarten and played together in several bands before moving to the Netherlands. Both signed in at the Fontys Rockademie of Tilburg in 2001, where they met Aruban vocalist Roger Peterson. These three young musicians, who all crossed the Atlantic, started to play in a roots reggae band, Orange Grove. Beside from their activities in Orange Grove, they also formed their own band "Intwine" in 2001, with fellow students Erwin Gielen (drums) and Kevin Hissink (guitar).

=== Breakthrough and first two albums (2002-2005) ===
In 2002 lead singer Roger Peterson was a participant in Idols, the Dutch version of Pop Idol, and reached the last ten finalists. Yet he decided to quit the show, after refusing to sign the Idols contract, because it wasn't supposed to allow him to play his own songs and with his own band. For him and Intwine, however, it yielded a lot of publicity and a record deal with Dureco. Regarding Idols, Peterson later said in an interview: "The show has been a friend in court for us (Intwine), but has also been a millstone around our necks. Idols invested a lot in our notoriety and we are grateful for that. However, people relate us with a show that didn't bring any good. Be honest: that show flopped."

Their first single "Happy?" was released in February 2003 in the Netherlands and Belgium and hit the third spot in the Dutch Top 40. Their debut self-titled album came out that same year on 3 October and spawned three more singles: "Way Out", "Get Outta My Head" and "Let Me Be". The band was nominated for the TMF Awards and for an Edison Award.

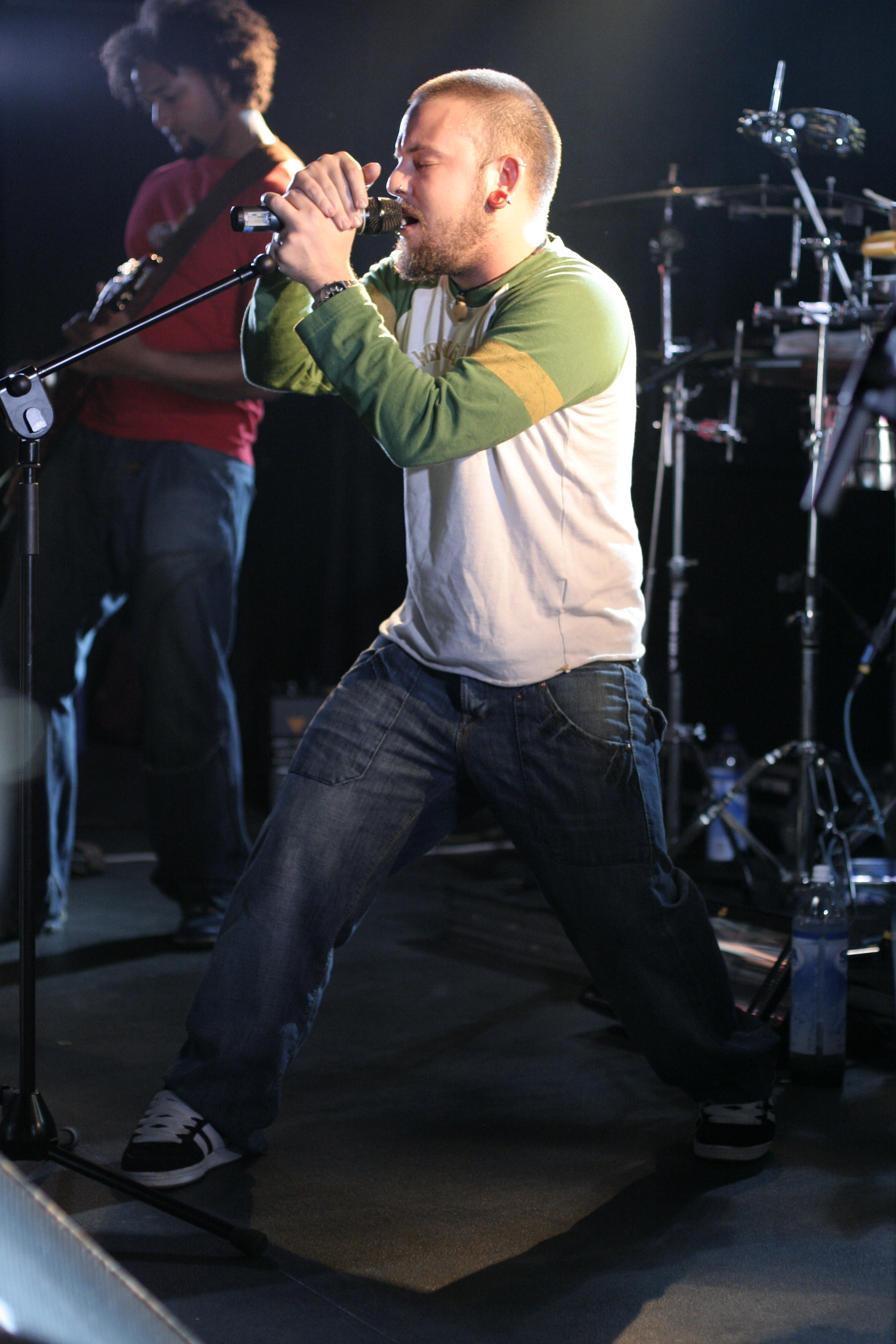
Guitarist Jacob Streefkerk (left) and frontman Roger Peterson in April 2006.

In 2004 Intwine released the DVD/live album The P.U.R.E. Session, a registration of one of their live shows, for which the band was joined by percussionist Ferdinand van Duuren. The same year the band composed and recorded the song "Cruel Man" as soundtrack for the Dutch film De Dominee (The Preacher). It was the first single of their second studio album Perfect, released through V2 Records on 27 September 2004. On 19 March 2005, Perfect was awarded with the 3FM Award for best album. "Cruel Man" reached seventh position in the Dutch Top 40 and even became number one in the Turkish charts. Drummer Erwin Gielen left the band in 2004 and was shortly replaced by Jeremy Bonarriba. In December 2004 Rocheteau Mahuwallan became Intwine's drummer.

In 2005 Intwine was nominated again for an Edison Award. Intwine played at the Pinkpop festival on 13 May and also performed at Madrid's MetroRock festival on 25 June. The same summer guitarist Kevin Hissink left the band and Jon Symons, earlier playing in a heavy metal band called Primal Rage, became his permanent substitute.

=== Pyrrhic Victory, label issues and Rumshop Sessions (2006-2007) ===
In February 2006 the band visited the favelas of Rio de Janeiro and incorporated the impressions of this trip into the non-album single "Peace of Mind". They donated the single's sales profits to the Millennium Development Goals project.

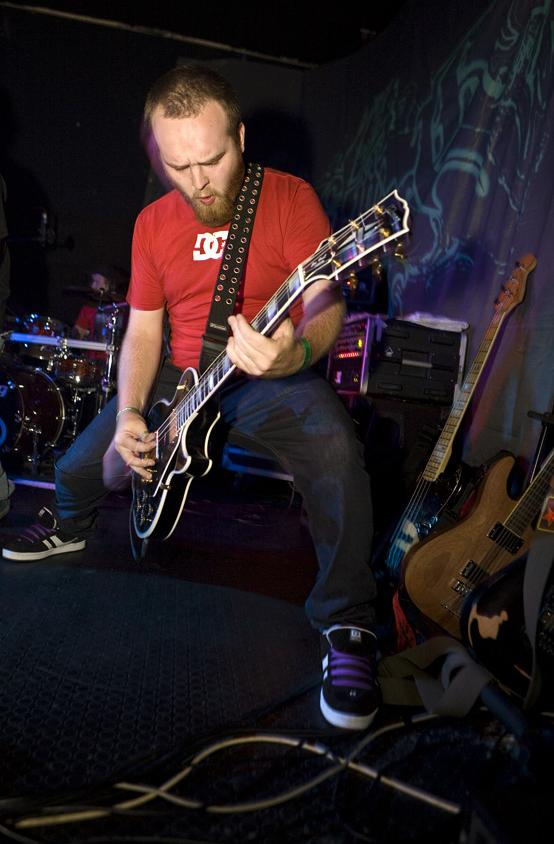
Guitarist Jon Symons joined Intwine in the summer of 2005.

Percussionist Ferdinand van Duuren left the band in 2006, due to personal and creative dissents.

Intwine wrote and recorded "Feel It" as the soundtrack for the 2006 movie Nachtrit (Nightrun), which also features Intwine's "For Goodness Sake". "Feel It" was also the first single of their third full-length album Pyrrhic Victory, released on 9 October 2006. About the record, the band stated on their website:"Pyrrhic Victory was recorded with sound artist Gordon Groothedde, who also worked with Intwine on their previous albums. The result is the most impressive project so far. This is a dark record. Spare, without any filler or frills. The gloves are off in songs such as "Cut Me Loose", "For Goodness Sake" and "Solo". Disappointment and pain have seldom been conveyed so beautifully and at the same time as grippingly as they have on this third CD. Yet the record also conveys a genuine fighting spirit. Intwine is rocking harder and sounding more honest than ever."

Due to internal circumstances, record label V2 was not able to promote the album, resulting in the fact that Intwine was only able to sell CD's at their live shows, making that few copies of Pyrrhic Victory were sold. At that time the band was asked by German record label Tiefdruck-Musik, who were impressed after seeing one of Intwine's live shows, to sign to their label and to release Pyrrhic Victory also abroad of the Netherlands. However, V2 refused to drop Intwine's contract. Yet Intwine later did manage to leave V2.

In 2007, Intwine toured the Dutch theatres for the first time with The Acoustic Rumshop Sessions. With these shows Intwine returns to their Caribbean roots, playing their songs in styles such as reggae, bolero, zouk, soca and cumbia. For this tour Intwine was joined by percussionist Roël Calister of Orange Grove.

As the soundtrack for the video game Assassin's Creed Intwine released the non-album single "The Chosen (Assassin's Creed)" featuring Brainpower in November 2007.

=== Kingdom of Contradiction and international ambitions (2008-2009) ===
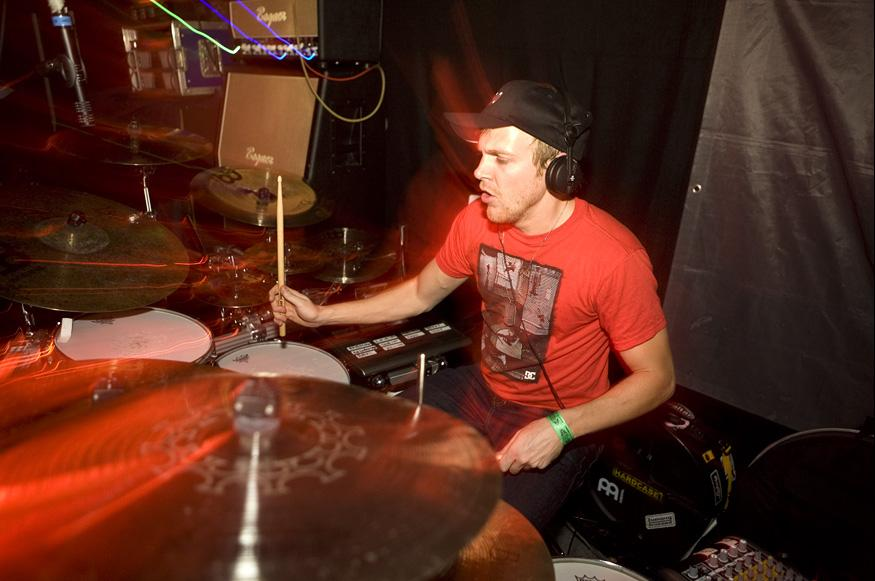
Drummer Eric Spring in 't Veld joined the band in 2008.

Intwine signed to German record label Tiefdruck-Musik in 2008 to start recording their new album. During the recording process bassist Touché Eusebius and drummer Rocheteau Mahuwallan left the band and were replaced by Pablo Penton and Eric Spring in 't Veld respectively.

Intwine released their fourth studio album Kingdom of Contradiction on 14 August 2009. The album is their first international release and contains fifteen songs that appeared on previous albums which Intwine re-recorded to present themselves abroad of the Netherlands. The album is produced by Jochem Jacobs, known of his work with Dutch metal band Textures. 3VOOR12 wrote that the band had given the songs a nu metal twist and sounded heavier, harsher and darker than before on this album. Comparisons were made to alternative metal bands such as Deftones, Incubus, P.O.D., Taproot, Godsmack and Ill Niño. Beside of the fifteen "old" tracks, the album also contained one "new" song, namely a cover of The Police's "Walking on the Moon", featuring Belgian vocalist Sarah Bettens.

With their new sound Intwine opened for American alt-metal band Sevendust on 1 June 2009 for their gig in Utrecht and four times for Welsh "ragga-metal" band Skindred in February and March 2010.

=== Rumshop Sessions EP and breakup (2010) ===
As a result of their Rumshop Sessions live shows, Intwine released an EP titled The Original Acoustic Rumshop Sessions Vol I on 19 June 2010, containing studio and live recordings of songs played at those shows.

On 16 October 2010 Intwine declared via its website that "the curtain had fallen". Motives for their breakup were not mentioned.

Seven years after the breakup, vocalist Roger Peterson and guitarist Jon Symons collaborated under the moniker JvR. They released three songs online in the summer of 2017.

== Musical style and influences ==
Intwine's musical style has been considered a fusion of rock with reggae, Latin, and hip hop influences. Throughout the years and with several line-up changes, the band shifted from the pop rock of their debut album Intwine (2003) and second album Perfect (2004) to a heavier and darker sound containing more heavy metal elements on the albums Pyrrhic Victory (2006) and Kingdom of Contradiction (2009).

Beside their regular shows, Intwine also played The Rumshop Sessions, in which they performed their songs acoustic and in Caribbean styles such as reggae, bolero, zouk, soca and cumbia. A collection of these songs were captured on their EP The Original Acoustic Rumshop Sessions Vol I (2010).

Regarding their influences, the band has been cited to have been inspired by musical groups ranging from heavy metal to reggae such as Metallica, Bob Marley & The Wailers, Sublime, Ozomatli, Sevendust, Krosfyah, Kassav', Collie Buddz, Foo Fighters, Audioslave, A Perfect Circle, Incubus, Deftones, Taproot, The Tea Party, Pearl Jam, Soundgarden, Sinch, Nirvana, Silverchair, Maná and Jarabe de Palo.

== Band members ==
- Roger Peterson – vocals (2001–2010)
- Jacob Streefkerk – guitar (2001–2010)
- Jon Symons – guitar (2005–2010)
- Eric Spring in 't Veld – drums (2008–2010)

=== Former members ===
- Erwin Gielen – drums (2001–2003)
- Jeremy Bonarriba – drums (2003–2004)
- Kevin Hissink – guitar (2001–2005)
- Ferdinand van Duuren – percussion (2004–2006)
- Edsel "Touché" Eusebius – bass guitar (2001–2008)
- Rocheteau Mahuwallan – drums (2004–2008)
- Pablo Penton – bass guitar (2008–2009)

=== Live members ===
- Roël Calister – percussion (2006–2007)
- Quincell Adolphin – bass guitar (2009–2010)
- Rik Kraak – bass guitar (2009–2010)

== Discography ==
=== Studio albums ===
- Intwine (Dureco, 2003)
- Perfect (V2, 2004)
- Pyrrhic Victory (V2, 2006)
- Kingdom of Contradiction (Tiefdruck-Musik/Universal, 2009)

=== EP ===
- The Original Acoustic Rumshop Sessions Vol I (INterTWINE, 2010)

=== Live album/DVD ===
- The P.U.R.E. Session (Dureco, 2004)

=== Singles ===
- "Happy?" (Dureco, 2003)
- "Get Outta My Head" (Dureco, 2003)
- "Way Out" (Dureco, 2003)
- "Let Me Be" (Dureco, 2004)
- "Cruel Man" (Dureco, 2004)
- "Slow Down" (V2, 2005)
- "You" (V2, 2005)
- "Peace of Mind" (V2, 2006)
- "Feel It" (V2, 2006)
- "Solo" (V2/INterTWINE, 2007)
- "Cut Me Loose" (V2/INterTWINE, 2008)
- "Perfect" (Tiefdruck-Musik/INterTWINE, 2009)

== Chart positions ==
=== Albums ===
Title	Date of release	Highest position	Number of weeks
Intwine	03-10-2003	17	21
Perfect	27-09-2004	18	28
Pyrrhic Victory	14-10-2006	43	4
Kingdom of Contradiction	14-08-2009	71	1

=== Singles ===
Year	Single	Album	Peak Position	
Year	Single	Album	Dutch Top 40	Dutch Top 100
2003	"Happy?"	Intwine	3	4
2003	"Way Out"	Intwine	22	24
2003	"Get Outta My Head"	Intwine	32	44
2004	"Let Me Be"	Intwine	-	50
2004	"Cruel Man"	Perfect	7	11
2005	"Slow Down"	Perfect	-	56
2005	"You"	Perfect	38	24
2006	"Peace of Mind"	non-album single	-	84
2006	"Feel It"	Pyrrhic Victory	-	24
2007	"The Chosen (Assassin's Creed)" (ft. Brainpower)	non-album single	-	43
2008	"Solo"	Pyrrhic Victory	-	90
