= The Crimson Corridor =

Studio album by Zao
- Released: April 9, 2021
- Recorded: November 2017 – early 2021
- Venue: The Church
- Studio: Treelady Studios
- Genre: Metalcore, post-metal
- Length: 57:02
- Label: Observed/Observer Recordings
- Producer: Dave Hidek

Zao studio album chronology
The Well-Intentioned Virus (2016)	The Crimson Corridor (2021)

The Crimson Corridor is the eleventh studio album by American metalcore band Zao. The album was released on April 9, 2021, through Observed/Observer Recordings, the band's own record label.

== Recording and lyrics ==
The album began the recording process on November 3, 2017, when Jeff Gretz officially began tracking drums, the same day as the release of their EP, Pyrrhic Victory. Weydant wrote the lyrics for the album, a common theme among a majority of the band's albums.

== Reception ==
Professional ratings
Review scores
Source	Rating
Angry Metal Guy	3.5/5 stars 4.5/5 stars
PunkNews.org	3.5/5 stars
Lambgoat	9/10 stars
Sputnik Music	4.2/5 stars
Kill Your Stereo	90/100
Metal Trenches	8.7/10 stars
Metal Digest	60%

On the Angry Metal Guy, the reviewer under the alias of Grymm, stated the following; "Much like fellow luminaries Converge, Zao is that rare example of a classic metalcore act not afraid to grow out of their sound and forge their own path, and if The Crimson Corridor is any indication, the path ahead will be intriguing." However, his co-worker, the 'Cherd of Doom', wrote a companion review stating, "Length issues aside, this is an impressive album. It would be shocking for a formerly Christian metalcore band to release such a powerful album almost 30 years into their trajectory if it was any band other than Zao. For them, it’s par for the course. There’s a kinship connection that’s hard to explain between those who have escaped religious fundamentalism." Lambgoat, in a surprising review, wrote "The Crimson Corridor ranks up with all of Zao's best material. Those nostalgic for Where Blood and Fire Bring Rest or Liberate Te Ex Inferis might argue, but the growth they have shown in recent years finds the band releasing some of the strongest material of their lengthy career.", giving the album a nine out of ten.

The user Dewinged of Sputnik Music wrote the following conclusion after giving the album a 4.2 out of 5; "Fueled by the fantastic mixing work achieved by Dave Hidek, Zao breathes (heavily) again with newfound strength and resolve, writing and performing some of their best material in years, and yet again, setting the bar for newcomers to heights that not many will reach." No Clean Singing's writer Andy Synn wrote a piece on the album as well, though not giving a rating; "In fact, the real paradox here is that, by creating what might just be the least traditionally Zao-sounding album of their career the band may very well have crafted the best record they’ve ever done." Wonderbox Metal wrote a review for the album, stating "The Crimson Corridor has exceeded already high expectations, and rather than simply deliver another stellar collection of songs, the band have delivered a true classic."

== Track listing ==
No.	Title	Length
1.	"Into the Jaws of Dread"	4:19
2.	"Ship of Theseus"	4:00
3.	"Croatoan"	4:18
4.	"The Final Ghost"	4:24
5.	"R.I.P.W."	4:56
6.	"The Crimson Corridor"	5:11
7.	"Transitions"	3:07
8.	"Nothing's Form"	7:03
9.	"Creator/Destroyer"	5:20
10.	"Lost Star"	3:56
11.	"The Web"	10:23

== Personnel ==
ZAO

- Daniel Weyandt - vocals, lettering
- Scott Mellinger - lead guitar, vocals
- Russ Cogdell - rhythm guitar
- Martin Lunn - bass
- Jeff Gretz - drums, art direction, layout

Additional musicians

- Christopher Dudley - synths, ambience on "Into the Jaws of Dread"
- Sydney Mellinger - violin on "The Web"

Production

- Dave Hidek - producer, mixing, engineering
- Daniel Carballal - additional editing
- Garrett Haines - mastering

Artwork

- Christopher McKenney - photography
- Bruno Santinho - photo rendering
- Jason Zeimet - photo rendering
- Chris Smith - logo
- Josh Cook - sigil
- Connor Anderson - hand illustration
