= The Well-Intentioned Virus =

Studio album by Zao
- Released: December 9, 2016
- Recorded: 2015–2016
- Genre: Metalcore
- Length: 42:16
- Label: Observed/Observer
- Producer: Zao

Zao studio album chronology
Awake? (2009)	The Well-Intentioned Virus (2016)	The Crimson Corridor (2021)

Singles from The Well-Intentioned Virus
- 1. "Xenophobe" Released: July 10, 2015; 2. "Observed/Observer" Released: October 13, 2016; 3. "A Well-Intentioned Virus" Released: October 27, 2016; 4. "Broken Pact Blues" Released: June 20, 2017

The Well-Intentioned Virus is the tenth studio album by American metalcore band Zao, released on December 9, 2016. The album features the first studio performance of Russ Cogdell for the first time since 2004's The Funeral of God. The album was released digitally, as well as on CD, vinyl and cassette. On December 1, 2016, the band streamed the whole album.

== Lyrical themes ==
Many of the lyrics have personal meaning to vocalist Daniel Weyandt, similar to a majority of the band's previous songs he was involved in. The song "The Weeping Vessel" has to do with the miscarriage of the Weyandt's first child. "A Well-Intentioned Virus" deals with people who thought what they were doing was right but were later looked upon as evil. "Broken Pact Blues" deals with Weyandt's brother Matt breaking a suicide pact. Other tracks have to deal with mortality, false truths and fever dreams.

== Critical reception ==
Professional ratings
Review scores
Source	Rating
HM Magazine	4/5 stars
Exclaim!	8/10
Indie Vision Music	5/5 stars
Jesus Freak Hideout	4/5 stars
Angry Metal Guy	4.5/5
Theprp	4/5 stars
Metalitalia	8/10
Where's The Beef	8.7
Metal Utopia	9/10

Danielle Martin of HM Magazine wrote "Zao has undoubtedly added to their score of culturally-relevant albums with this one. With its veteran backbone, raw voice, and savage-yet-developed cacophony, it will join the ranks of their more memorable releases; it seems the passage of time has only sharpened their aptitude." "The Well-Intentioned Virus is their best album in over a decade, picking up where The Funeral of God left off in terms of quality while nailing the progression they've been pursuing since." writes Bradley Zorgdrager of Exclaim. Mason Beard of Indie Vision Music wrote "The band is still the same as ever, just back with a new sound. The band still has the heart-felt message of all the way back when none of these guys were in the band. The message has only changed ever slightly. They sound like Zao." Michael Weaver of Jesus Freak Hideout wrote "The album isn't marketed for a Christian audience, and while there isn't any major offensive material here, I'd still recommend that some caution be given due to the dark nature of the content. Hopefully this marks a full reunion for Zao and not just a one-off performance. Enjoy this metal gem and relish the return of Zao." while Jeremy Barnes wrote "Zao have broken a seven-year silence with another strong addition to their famed discography and have gifted the metal genre an appropriate closing note for an outstanding year." Grymm of Angry Metal Guy reports " I just hope the next album takes less than seven years, but this was well worth the wait. Highly recommended." Wookubus of Theprp stated "In a way, it’s almost fitting though as nothing about this album feels labored or sterile. Much like its namesake would suggest, there’s a vicious organic corruption here that rapidly spreads and takes over, will you be able to endure it?" Where's the Beef wrote "The Well-Intentioned Virus is a fantastic example of what an album should sound like after a long hiatus. Show the fans that you had a real reason for coming back. There are some moments that could have used a bit more polish, but I can look past them given the grade-A Kobe beef held within." Matthew Michel of Metal Utopia wrote "Zao means “alive” in Greek. The band has returned with confidence and stayed true to its name. The Well-Intentioned Virus is a contender for the best metalcore album of the year. In fact, it may help breathe new life into the hardcore scene. Suddenly, you remember the minuscule replicators dormant within your blood. The virus exults in its new-found freedom; it prepares itself and surges forward in a new effort at rebirth. It's still there, ready to break out. You're unsure of its motivation. Can you feel it? You will."

== Track listing ==
No.	Title	Length
1.	"The Weeping Vessel"	4:10
2.	"A Well-Intentioned Virus"	3:33
3.	"Broken Pact Blues"	3:33
4.	"Jinba Ittai"	2:52
5.	"Apocalypse"	6:46
6.	"Xenophobe"	3:10
7.	"Haunting Pools"	3:12
8.	"Observed/Observer"	3:43
9.	"The Sun Orbits Around Flat Earth Witch Trials"	3:49
10.	"I Leave You in Peace"	7:28

== Personnel ==
Zao

- Daniel Weyandt – vocals
- Scott Mellinger – guitar, vocals
- Russ Cogdell – guitar
- Martin Lunn – bass, vocals
- Jeff Gretz – drums

Production

- Matt Kerley – artwork
- Dave Hidek – mixing, engineer
- Dave Cerminara – editing, post-production
- Daniel Carballal – editing, post-production
- Liz Klehm – editing, post-production
- Al Torrence – editing, post-production
- Vaughan Woosley – editing, post-production
- Garrett Haines – mastering
- Ben Buckner – art layout
- Josh Bonati – lacquers
