= The Fear Is What Keeps Us Here =

Studio album by Zao
- Released: June 13, 2006
- Studios: Electrical Audio, Chicago, Illinois
- Genre: Metalcore
- Length: 37:52
- Label: Ferret
- Producer: Steve Albini

Zao studio album chronology
The Funeral of God (2004)	The Fear Is What Keeps Us Here (2006)	Awake? (2009)

Professional ratings
Review scores
Source	Rating
AllMusic	3.5/5 stars
About.com	3.5/5 stars
Kerrang!	5/5 stars
HCS.net	4/5 stars
Relevant Magazine	(not rated)
Punknews.org	3.5/5 stars

The Fear Is What Keeps Us Here is the eighth studio album by American metalcore band Zao. It was released on June 13, 2006 on Ferret Music. The album showcases the addition of drummer Jeff Gretz and bassist Martin Lunn. In interviews Gretz jokingly claimed it would be titled "The George Lucas Neckfat".

== Album note ==
The album was released in two versions. The limited edition deluxe edition contains expanded artwork and a bonus "making the album" DVD. Both versions contain the same music. Some pre-ordered copies of the album came with a separate sheet of paper with easier-to-read lyrics for each song.

== Concept ==
There is no strict concept to the album, as on The Funeral of God. The album deals with more obscure/varied subject matter. Topics throughout the album include death and loss of everything you have ("Everything You Love Will Soon Fly Away"), politics ("American Sheets on the Deathbed", "Kingdom of Thieves"), frustration with false interpretations of the band's purpose ("It's Hard Not to Shake with a Gun in Your Mouth"), that we can't do it all alone ("Physician Heal Thyself"), American priorities ("Pudgy Young Blondes with Lobotomy Eyes") and zombies ("My Love, My Love (We've Come Back From the Dead)"). The band says the underlying theme is "loss of control."

== Sound ==
It's been called the most abrasive Zao record to date. Steve Albini's live to analog-tape production (with no computer "fixing") and the band's decision to track all of the drums, bass and guitar live lends an accurate representation of the band's live sound. Dan Weyandt's vocals are given the same treatment as he sang with a hand-held microphone through an amplifier to simulate an over-driven P.A. at a small club show. Instead of adding the melodic elements that were introduced on the album The Funeral of God, it takes a somewhat raw, black metal-influenced sound.

== Track listing ==
All tracks are written by Daniel Weyandt and Scott Mellinger, except where noted.

No.	Title	Length
1.	"Cancer Eater"	2:39
2.	"Physician Heal Thyself"	3:56
3.	"Everything You Love Will Soon Fly Away"	3:07
4.	"It's Hard Not to Shake with a Gun in Your Mouth"	3:53
5.	"Kingdom of Thieves"	3:23
6.	"Killing Time 'Til It's Time to Die"	3:02
7.	"There Is No Such Thing as Paranoia"	3:06
8.	"Pudgy Young Blondes with Lobotomy Eyes"	3:56
9.	"My Love, My Love (We've Come Back from the Dead)"	2:48
10.	"American Sheets on the Deathbed"	2:47
11.	"A Last Time for Everything"	5:15

Japanese edition bonus track
No.	Title	Writer(s)	Length
12.	"Black Coffee" (Black Flag cover)	Greg Ginn	4:20

== Credits ==
Zao

- Daniel Weyandt – lead vocals
- Scott Mellinger – guitar, clean vocals
- Martin Lunn – bass, backing vocals
- Jeff Gretz – drums

Additional

- Steve Albini – recording engineer
- John Golden – mastering
- Jeff Gros – photography
- Carl Severson – A&R
