= Awake? (Zao album) =

Studio album by Zao
- Released: May 5, 2009
- Genre: Metalcore
- Length: 42:25
- Label: Ferret
- Producer: Tim Lambesis, Daniel Castleman, Scott Mellinger

Zao studio album chronology
The Fear Is What Keeps Us Here (2006)	Awake? (2009)	The Well-Intentioned Virus (2016)

Professional ratings
Review scores
Source	Rating
Jesus Freak Hideout	4/5 stars
Metal Storm	6/10
PopMatters	4/10 stars
Thrash Hits	4/6 stars
Under the Gun Review	7/10

Awake? is the ninth studio album by American metalcore band Zao. It was released on May 5, 2009, on Ferret Records. It contains nine new tracks and a re-recording of the track "Romance of the Southern Spirit", which originally appeared on the Japanese version of The Funeral of God. Only 8,000 physical copies of the album were made. Each copy is numbered and has six interchangeable covers. The album sold approximately 2,000 copies in its first week. The single "Entropica" debuted in April 2009 prior to the album's release.

== Writing and recording ==
The album was recorded in California and Pennsylvania, with the vocals, bass, and guitars being recorded in the latter and the drums in the former. While the majority of the recording was done by Dave Hidek in Pennsylvania, Jeff Gretz flew out to California to record drums with Tim Lambesis and Daniel Castleman, with the latter having more involvement in the process. Gretz finished the album with three days left scheduled for recording, which led to his collaboration with Austrian Death Machine on their Double Brutal album.

The album was recorded using Pro Tools rather than Analog recording like they had done with The Fear Is What Keeps Us Here.

== Track listing ==
All lyrics are written by Daniel Weyandt, except where noted; all music is composed by Scott Mellinger, except where noted.

No.	Title	Lyrics	Music	Length
1.	"1,000,000 Outstretched Arms of Nothing"			3:39
2.	"Entropica"			3:37
3.	"The Eyes Behind the Throne"			3:36
4.	"Human Cattle Masses Marching Forward"			3:39
5.	"Romance of the Southern Spirit"		Russ Cogdell	4:51
6.	"What Will You Find?"			3:44
7.	"Awake?"			3:41
8.	"Quiet Passenger Pt. 1"			4:00
9.	"Reveal"	Gabe Felice		4:53
10.	"Quiet Passenger Pt. 2/The World Caved In"			6:53

== Credits ==
Zao

- Daniel Weyandt - vocals
- Scott Mellinger - guitar, clean vocals, engineer
- Martin Lunn - bass, vocals
- Jeff Gretz - drums

Production

- Tim Lambesis - production
- Daniel Castleman - engineer, mixing, producer
- Dave Hidek - engineer
- Alan Douches - mastering
- Russ Cogdell - lyrical writing on "Romance of the Southern Spirit"

Cover Art

- Gabe Felice - Cover art, lyrical writing on "Reveal"

Invisible Creature

- Ryan Clark - layout
- Don Clark - layout
