= A Small Noise =

Compilation album by The Juliana Theory
- Released: February 7, 2006
- Genre: Emo, indie rock
- Label: Tooth & Nail

The Juliana Theory chronology
Deadbeat Sweetheartbeat (2005)	A Small Noise (2006)	Troubadour – West Hollywood CA 11/3/05 (2006)

Professional ratings
Review scores
Source	Rating
AllMusic	4/5 stars

A Small Noise is an unofficial compilation album by The Juliana Theory. Released by Tooth & Nail Records without approval from the band, it is not listed on their official website as part of their discography.

== Track listing ==
1. "Duane Joseph" – 3:59
2. "For Evangeline" – 5:00
3. "August in Bethany" – 4:19
4. "Constellation" – 6:31
5. "The Closest Thing" – 4:08
6. "If I Told You This Was Killing Me, Would You Stop?" – 3:51
7. "Into the Dark" – 4:03
8. "To the Tune of 5,000 Screaming Children" – 3:51
9. "Is Patience Still Waiting?" – 3:48
10. "We're At the Top of the World" – 3:16
11. "You Always Say Goodnight, Goodnight" – 9:30
12. "This Is the End of Your Life" – 5:52
13. "Breathing by Wires" – 6:22
