= Instant Live =

- Industry: Music
- Founded: United States (2003)
- Headquarters: Beverly Hills, CA
- Key people: Live Nation
- Products: Live Concert recordings, Compact discs, downloads
- Website: www.instantlive.com

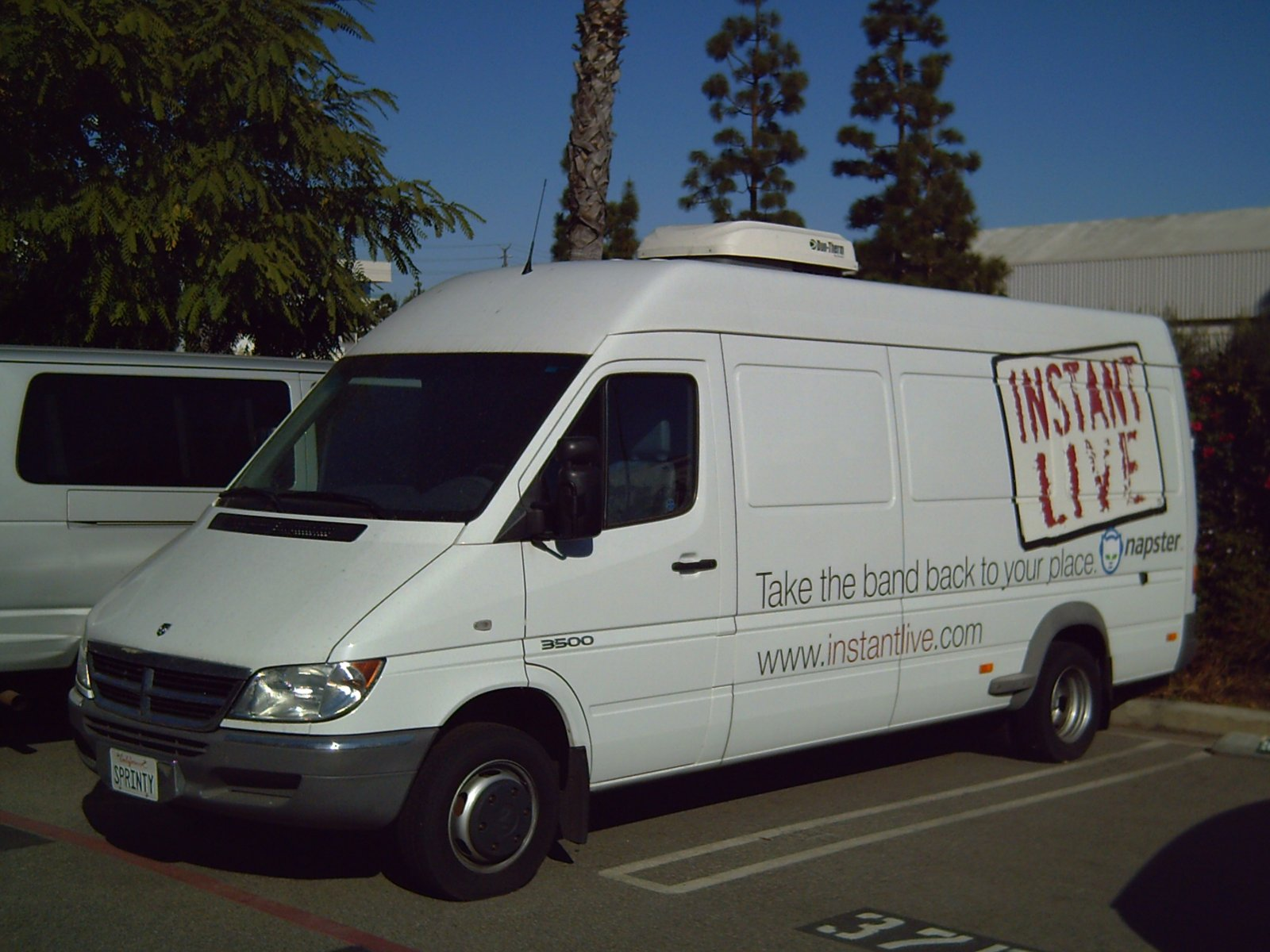
Instant Live recording van

Instant Live was a service by Live Nation which provides for the distribution of digital live recordings of concerts and music events, available soon after a performance has ended. Music is recorded and mixed at the event, by personnel inside the company's portable recording vans.

The program was rolled out in clubs in Boston, Massachusetts in 2003, and has since expanded internationally. Live Nation once held a patent on a process for placing markers between songs during a live performance, giving them an effective monopoly on post-concert digital recording. The patent was subsequently rejected by the US Patent and Trademark Office after the Electronic Frontier Foundation submitted evidence of prior art to the USPTO, which was originally researched by competitor DiscLive.

To date Instant Live has done live recordings of almost 200 artists, including the Allman Brothers Band, Phil Lesh and Friends, Black Crowes, Yo-Yo Ma, and Peter Frampton.

Instant Live is no longer provided by Live Nation.
