= Understand This Is a Dream =

Studio album by The Juliana Theory
- Released: March 23, 1999
- Recorded: October 16–30, 1998
- Studio: Poynter Recordings Facility
- Genre: Emo, indie rock
- Length: 42:24
- Label: Tooth & Nail
- Producer: Barry Poynter

The Juliana Theory chronology
The Juliana Theory / Dawson High Split (1998)	Understand This Is a Dream (1999)	The Juliana Theory / Onelinedrawing / The Grey AM 3 Way Split (2000)

Understand This Is a Dream is the debut studio album by Greensburg, Pennsylvania rock band, The Juliana Theory, released on March 23, 1999 by Tooth & Nail Records. Prior to the release of Love in 2003, Understand This Is a Dream had reportedly sold over 150,000 copies.

== Production ==
Understand This Is a Dream was recorded between October 16 and 30, 1998 at Poynter Recordings Facility in Little Rock, Arkansas, with producer and engineer Barry Poynter, assisted by Jason Magnusson. The band stayed at the Economy Inn, and were driven to the studio by Momper's parents Pop and Michelle. Detar's and Momper's parents provided additional funding for the sessions; the band loaned equipment from Phyrric Victory. Poynter, Magnusson and Detar mixed the recordings, before they were mastered by Ramone at Oceanview Digital Mastering.

== Critical reception ==
Professional ratings
Review scores
Source	Rating
AllMusic	3/5 stars

Doug Van Pelt from HM Magazine stated that "If you like the infectious pop of Plankeye, and appreciate that it's dirty and groove-filled rather than compressed and polished (the "Nashville treatment"), [you] will love The Juliana Theory."

== Track listing ==
All music by the Juliana Theory, all lyrics by Brett Detar, except for assistance from Chad Alan on "Duane Joseph" and "Seven Forty Seven".

1. "This Is Not a Love Song" - 3:13
2. "Duane Joseph" - 4:01
3. "August in Bethany" - 4:21
4. "Music Box Superhero" - 4:27
5. "Seven Forty Seven" - 3:03
6. "The Closest Thing" - 4:09
7. "Show Me the Money" - 4:28
8. "For Evangeline" - 5:03
9. "P.S. We'll Call You When We Get There" - 3:07
10. "Constellation" - 6:34
11. "Farewell My Friend" - 2:44 (Vinyl Only Track)

== Personnel ==
Personnel per booklet.

The Juliana Theory

- Brett Detar – vocals
- Chad Alan – bass
- Jeremiah Momper – guitar
- Joshua Fielder – guitar
- Neil Herbank – drums

Additional musicians

- Barry Poynter – slide guitar (track 8)

Production and design

- Barry Poynter – engineer, producer, mixing
- Jason Magnusson – assistant, mixing
- Brett Detar – mixing
- Ramone – mastering
- Roman Barrett – photography
- Jason Parker – art direction
- The Juliana Theory – art direction
- Brandon Ebel – executive producer
