= The Funeral of God =

Studio album by Zao
- Released: July 13, 2004
- Recorded: Trax East, New Jersey
- Genre: Metalcore
- Length: 47:18
- Label: Ferret, Roadrunner
- Producer: Eric Rachel and Zao

Zao chronology
All Else Failed (2003)	The Funeral of God (2004)	The Fear Is What Keeps Us Here (2006)

Zao studio album chronology
Parade of Chaos (2002)	The Funeral of God (2004)	The Fear Is What Keeps Us Here (2006)

Professional ratings
Review scores
Source	Rating
AbsolutePunk	82%
AllMusic	(not rated)
HCS.net	4/5 stars
Jesus Freak Hideout	4.5/5 stars

The Funeral of God is the seventh studio album by American metalcore band Zao. It was released in July 13, 2004 through Ferret Records in the US, and in July 12, 2004 through Roadrunner and Ferret in Europe and Asia. It saw the return of guitarist, Russ Cogdell, and the addition of bassist Shawn Koschik and drummer Stephen Peck after the departure of Jesse Smith. A music video was made for the song "The Rising End (The First Prophecy)".

== Title note ==
Originally the album was going to be called, Live... from the Funeral of God, but the band's management was concerned that fans might construe that to mean it's a live recording, so the title was shortened.

== Concept ==
The album is a concept album, narrating an apocalyptic story in which God, fed up with the path chosen by humanity, decides to disappear, leaving humanity to its fate. Subsequently, the world falls into a state of war and self-destruction. However, man soon reverts to a state in which he waits for God to return.

== Sound ==
Sounding different from the most albums Zao released, this record is a swing towards bands such as Killswitch Engage and Shadows Fall. It also goes for a more melodic sound than their past albums, such as in the song "Psalm of the City of the Dead".

== Track listing ==
All lyrics are written by Daniel Weyandt, except where noted; all music is composed by Zao, except where noted.

No.	Title	Lyrics	Length
1.	"Breath of the Black Muse"	Daniel Weyandt, Scott Mellinger	4:00
2.	"The Rising End (The First Prophecy)"		3:27
3.	"The Last Revelation (The Last Prophecy)"	Weyandt, Mellinger	3:56
4.	"The Last Song from Zion"		4:47
5.	"Live... from the Funeral of God"	Weyandt, Mellinger	4:11
6.	"The Lesser Lights of Heaven"		4:15
7.	"In Times Gone Past"	Weyandt, Mellinger	4:33
8.	"Praise the War Machine"		4:06
9.	"Truly, Truly, This Is the End"	Weyandt, Mellinger	4:22
10.	"I Lay Sleepless in My Grave"	instrumental	1:32
11.	"Psalm of the City of the Dead"	Russ Cogdell	8:09
Total length:			47:18

Japan bonus track
No.	Title	Music	Length
12.	"Romance of the Southern Spirit"	Weyandt, Cogdell	4:49

== Credits ==
ZAO

- Daniel Weyandt – lead vocals
- Scott Mellinger – guitar, clean vocals
- Russ Cogdell – guitar
- Shawn Koschik – bass, additional engineering, string arrangements
- Stephen Peck – drums

Additional Musicians

- Sara George – additional vocals on track 11
- Josh Momper – piano

Production

- Eric Rachel – producer, engineering, mixing
- Alan Douches – mastering

Artwork

- Don and Ryan Clark (Asterisk Studios) – art direction, design
- Kris McCaddon – logo
- Sarah Fiedler – photography
- Chris Bruno – cover photo

Misc.

- Ryan J. Downey – manager
